= Thompson =

Thompson may refer to:

== People ==
- Thompson (surname)
- Thompson Lantion, Filipino retired police general
- Thompson M. Scoon (1888–1953), New York politician
- Marko Perković (born 1966), Croatian musician known by the stage name Thompson

== Places ==
=== Australia ===
- Thompson Beach, South Australia, a locality

=== Bulgaria ===
- Thompson, Bulgaria, a village in Sofia Province

=== Canada ===
- Thompson, Manitoba
- Thompson (electoral district), an electoral district in the above location
- Rural Municipality of Thompson, Manitoba
- Thompson River, a river in British Columbia
  - Thompson Country, a region within the basin of the Thompson River
  - Thompson Plateau, a landform in the Interior of British Columbia named for the Thompson River
  - Thompson-Nicola Regional District, a regional district in British Columbia
- Thompson Sound (British Columbia), a sound in the area of the Broughton Archipelago
- Thompson Sound, British Columbia, an unincorporated locality at Thompson Sound
- Thompson Station, Nova Scotia

=== England ===
- Thompson, Norfolk

=== New Zealand ===
- Thompson Sound (New Zealand), one of the indentations in the coast of the South island's Fiordland National Park

=== United States ===
- Thompson, Alabama
- Thompson, Connecticut
- Thompson, Iowa
- Thompson, Missouri
- Thompson, Nebraska
- Thompson, New York
- Thompson, North Dakota
- Thompson, Ohio
- Thompson, Pennsylvania
- Thompson, Wisconsin
- Thompson Island (Massachusetts), an island in Boston Harbor
- Thompson Springs, Utah, which for a time was also officially known as simply "Thompson"
  - Thompson (Amtrak station), the former train station in Thompson Springs

== Other uses ==
- Thompson Island (South Atlantic)
- Thomson-CSF, a French defense contractor
- Nlaka'pamux, a Canadian First Nation also known as "the Thompson"
  - Thompson language, spoken by the Nlaka'pamux
- USS Thompson, two U.S. Navy destroyers
- Thompson submachine gun
- Thomson and Thompson (Dupont et Dupond), two clumsy detectives from the Tintin series
- Thompson (band), a Croatian rock band
- Thompson Media Group
- Thompson (TV series), 1988 British variety television series
- Thompson/Center Contender, a single-shot pistol
- Clan MacTavish, An Ancient Scottish Highlands Clan

== See also ==
- Thompson Hall (disambiguation)
- Thompson Creek (disambiguation)
- Thompson River (disambiguation)
- Thompson Lake (disambiguation)
- Thompson Township (disambiguation)
- Thomson (disambiguation)
- Thomson (surname)
- Thomsen
- Justice Thompson (disambiguation)
