= Thomson =

Thomson may refer to:

== Names ==
- Thomson (surname), a list of people with this name and a description of its origin
- Thomson baronets, four baronetcies created for persons with the surname Thomson

== Businesses and organizations ==
- SGS-Thomson Microelectronics, an electronics manufacturer in the semiconductors industry
- Various travel subsidiaries of TUI Group:
  - Thomson Airways (now TUI Airways), a UK-based airline
  - Thomson Cruises (now Marella Cruises), a UK-based cruise line
  - Thomson Travel (now TUI UK), a UK-based travel company
  - Thomsonfly, a former UK airline, formerly Britannia Airways
- Thomson Directories, local business search company and publisher of:
  - Thomson Local, the UK business directory
- Thomson Multimedia, former name of Technicolor SA and now Vantiva SA, a French consumer electronics manufacturer and media services provider originating as conglomerate Thomson-Houston
  - Thomson-CSF, former name for the Thales Group
- Thomson Reuters, Canadian media and information services company
  - Thomson Corporation, former name of the company prior to its 2008 merger with Reuters
  - Thomson Financial, former business division of Thomson
  - Thomson Healthcare, former healthcare division of Thomson
  - Thomson Scientific, former research division of Thomson
  - Thomson Newspapers, former newspaper division of Thomson, sold in 2000 to various firms including Gannett, CNHI, and Media General
- Thomsons Online Benefits, a UK-based provider of employee benefit programmes
- L.H. Thomson, manufacturer of aircraft and bicycle parts

== Places ==
- Thomson (crater), a lunar impact crater in the Mare Ingenii on the far side of the Moon

Australia

- Thomson Dam
- Thomson River (Queensland)
- Thomson River (Victoria)
- Thomson, Victoria, a suburb of Geelong

Canada

- David and Mary Thomson Collegiate Institute, a high school located in Toronto, Ontario

Singapore

- Thomson, Singapore, a neighborhood in Singapore
- Thomson Road, Singapore, a major trunk road
  - Thomson–East Coast Line, a mass rapid transit line

United States

- Thomson, Georgia
- Thomson, Illinois
  - Thomson Correctional Center
- Thomson, Minnesota
  - Thomson Dam (Minnesota)
- Thomson, New York

== Science and technology ==
- Joule–Thomson effect, temperature change of a fluid passing through a valve in a thermally insulated system
- thomson (unit), a unit for mass-to-charge ratio, symbol: Th
- Thomson structures, synonym for Widmanstätten patterns
- Thomson, abbreviation used to indicate Thomas Thomson when citing a botanical name
- Thomson cubic, the locus of centers of circumconics of a triangle
- Thomson effect, the heating or cooling of a current-carrying conductor in a temperature gradient
- Thomson's gazelle, a species of gazelle
- Thomson MO5, MO6, TO7, TO8, microcomputers made by Thomson SA in the 1980s
- Thomson problem,
- Thomson scattering, the elastic scattering of electromagnetic radiation by a free charged particle

== See also ==
- Thomson Reservoir (disambiguation)
- Thompson (disambiguation)
- Thompson (surname)
- Thomsen
- Thomason (disambiguation)
