= Thomson Township =

Thomson Township may refer to the following places in the United States:

- Thomson Township, Carlton County, Minnesota
- Thomson Township, Scotland County, Missouri

== See also ==
- Thompson Township (disambiguation)
- Thomson (disambiguation)
