= Thompson Township, Ohio =

Thompson Township, Ohio may refer to:

- Thompson Township, Delaware County, Ohio
- Thompson Township, Geauga County, Ohio
- Thompson Township, Seneca County, Ohio

== See also ==
- Thompson Township (disambiguation)
