= LMUR =

Russian helicopter air-to-surface missile

Kh-39 Лёгкая многоцелевая управляемая ракета
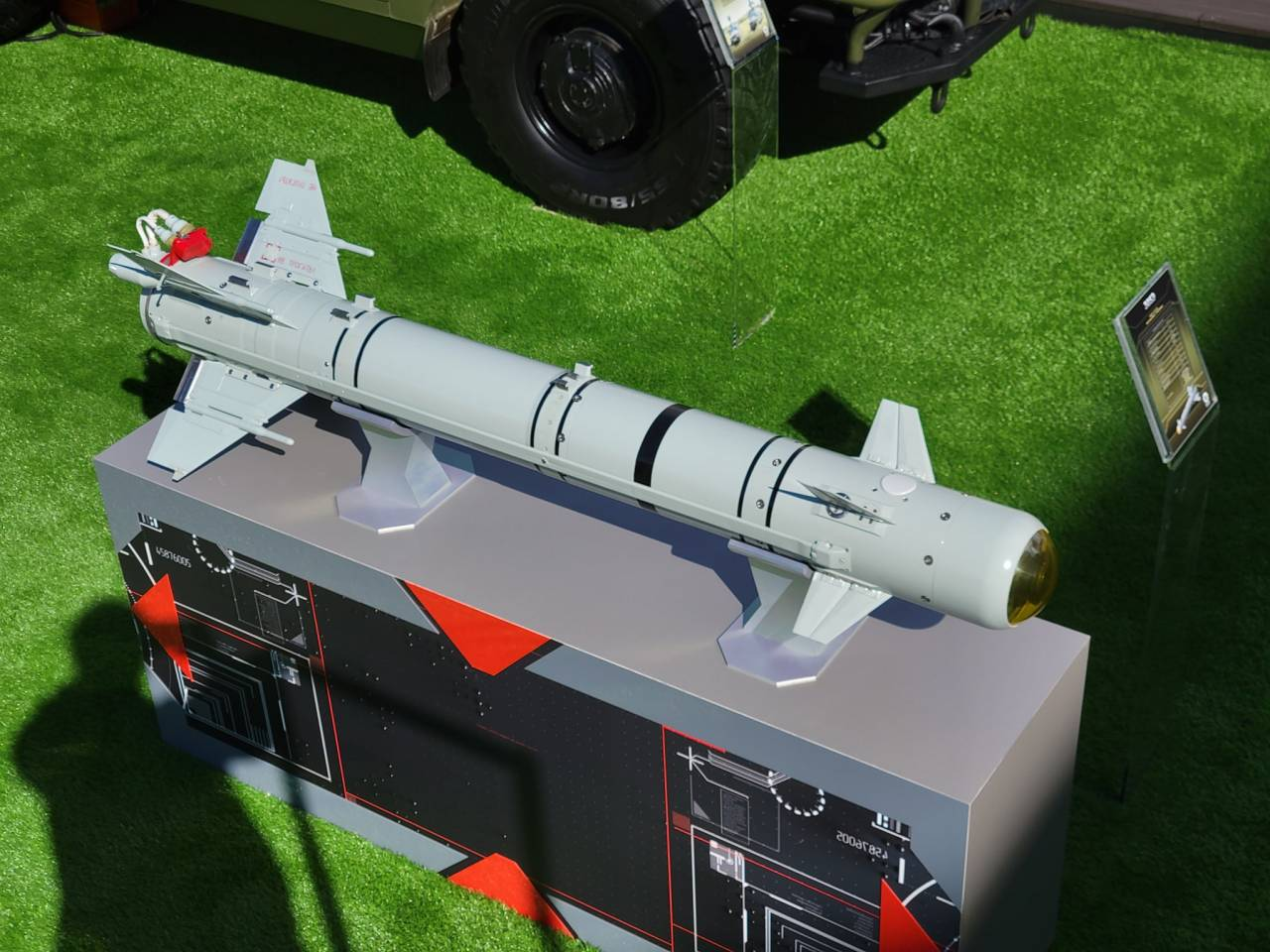
- Combat version of the LMUR, seen at the ARMY-2021 forum
- Place of origin: Russia

Service history
- Used by: FSB, Russian Aerospace Forces
- Wars: Russian invasion of Ukraine

Production history
- Designer: KB Mashinostroyeniya
- Designed: 2011
- Manufacturer: KB Mashinostroyeniya
- Unit cost: 14.2 million rubles (2018)
- Produced: 2016
- No. built: 200+

Specifications
- Mass: 105 kg (231 lb)
- Length: 1.945 m (6.38 ft)
- Diameter: 200 mm (7.9 in)
- Engine: Solid rocket motor
- Operational range: 14.5 km (7.8 nmi)
- Flight ceiling: 600 m (2,000 ft)
- Flight altitude: 100–600 m (330–1,970 ft)
- Maximum speed: 230 m/s (450 kn)
- Launch platform: Mil Mi-8MNP-2; Mil Mi-28NM; Kamov Ka-52M

The LMUR (Russian: ЛМУР, Легкая многоцелевая управляемая ракета, romanized: Legkaya Mnogotselevaya Upravlyayemaya Raketa, lit. 'Light Multipurpose Guided Rocket') is a Russian helicopter-launched air-to-surface missile. It is also recognized under the alternative designations Kh-39, Izdeliye 305 (Russian: Изделие 305, lit. 'Product no. 305') and 9A-7755.

== Development ==
The acronym "LMUR" first appeared around 2007. Back then, it designated a lightweight missile project from the Tactical Missiles Corporation. This project was abandoned in 2009 for unknown reasons. However, in February 2011, a research and development order, code-named Prefix (Префикс in Russian), was passed by the Russian Ministry of Defence to KB Mashinostroyeniya for the creation of a new lightweight multirole missile, known as Izdeliye 79. The contract indicated that the new missile would have to be ready for serial production by late November 2014. Even though a batch of test missiles was completed in 2013, these could not be tested, because the Ministry of Defence had not ordered the development of any launchers. Hence, KBM officially declared it had stopped the missile's development, two weeks before the deadline set by the MoD. The contract was officially terminated only in 2017.

This did not spell the end of the project though. Indeed, probably in 2012, the FSB contracted KBM for the development of a missile called Izdeliye 305, that would equip its Mil Mi-8MNP-2 special operations helicopters. Izdeliye 305 is very similar to the earlier "Izdeliye 79", but it has an additional two-way datalink, allowing for man in the loop capability. Testing of the LMUR on the Mi-8MNP-2 took place in 2015–2016, and serial production started shortly after. The Ministry of Defence then became interested again, and placed its own order. Testing of the LMUR started on the Mil Mi-28NM in 2019, and on the Kamov Ka-52M in 2020. Reportedly, it will also be used by Mil Mi-8AMTSh-VN special forces helicopters. Around 2017, it was planned to develop a launcher based on an armoured vehicle too. The Russian Aerospace Forces adopted the missile in 2022.

== Design ==
The LMUR has a canard configuration. It has four fins on the front, and four bigger wings at the back. These are folded for transport, and unfolded when the missile is mounted on its carrier helicopter. Two of the wings have rear-looking datalink antennas. The LMUR is heavier than Russian helicopter-launched ATGMs, at 105 kg. For comparison, the 9M120-1 Ataka-1 weighs 48.5 kg together with its launch tube, and the 9M127-1 Vikhr-1 weighs 59 kg with its launch tube. Its warhead is also around three times bigger, at 25 kg compared to 7.4 kg for the Ataka-1 and 8.6 kg for the Vikhr-1. However, while the Ataka and Vikhr missiles can use shaped-charge warheads, it is not known whether a version of the LMUR equipped with such a warhead exists. The Izdeliye 305 uses a high-explosive demolition warhead. A version with a cumulative warhead might exist.

The LMUR's maximum range is 14.5 km, which is superior to that of Russian helicopter-launched ATGMs. It has an optical/thermal imaging seeker. It can be used in two different modes. In the first one, the target is marked by the operator before launch, and the carrier helicopter can turn away directly after the missile launch. In the second mode, the missile is launched without it being locked on a target. It first flies in its direction, using inertial guidance with satellite navigation providing corrections. The image from the seeker is transmitted back to the helicopter via a datalink pod called the AS-BPLA (Аппаратура связи с беспилотным летательным аппаратом or communication equipment with an unmanned aerial vehicle). The operator can select the target and change it while the missile is flying towards its area. The LMUR is the first Russian ATGM capable of being used in this fashion. This second mode of operation is the only one in which the missile can be used at its maximum range, due to the seeker's limitations. On the Mi-8MNP-2, the AS-BPLA datalink antenna is located in a fairing in the nose, which is also the case on a new variant of the Mi-28NE, shown at the 2021 Dubai Airshow (its location is used by the guidance antenna for the 9M120 Ataka missile on other Mi-28 versions). On the Ka-52M, it is situated under the left stub wing.

Two different launch rails can be used to carry the LMUR, both manufactured by Vympel: the APU-305 for a single missile, and the later APU-L twin launcher.

== Operational history ==
The LMUR was reportedly tested in combat conditions in Syria.

In June 2022, Russian media claimed that the LMUR was being used in Ukraine by Mil Mi-28NM helicopters. Several videos reportedly showing footage from the missile's seeker were also shared on social media. However, as of that time neither the Mi-28NM nor the Ka-52M were in service with operational units. Hence, it was thought that the most likely launch platforms were FSB-operated Mi-8MNP-2s. The footage shared online shows the LMUR being used mostly against buildings and warehouses, but also targeting pontoon bridges and vehicles around them, both armoured and soft-skinned. As of late November 2022, more than 40 videos showing combat use of the LMUR in Ukraine had been released. In January 2023, videos showing Mi-28NM helicopters using the LMUR in combat missions over Ukraine appeared online. The same month, a Russian source claimed that the missile had started to be used by the recently delivered Ka-52M.

== Variants ==
- Izdeliye 79 – first variant, ordered by the Russian Ministry of Defence but never tested. Not equipped with the later versions' datalink.
- Izdeliye 305 – variant originally developed for the FSB, equipped with the two-way datalink.
- Izdeliye 305-UL – training variant with smaller wings and no warhead.
- Izdeliye 305E – export variant.
- Izdeliye 306 – variant with unknown characteristics, possibly fitted with a shaped-charge warhead.

== Operators ==
- Russia
  - FSB
  - Russian Aerospace Forces

== See also ==
- Spike – (Israel)
- Akeron MP – (France)
- Nag – (India)
- PARS 3 LR – (Germany)
- UMTAS – (Turkey)
