= Kamov V-100 =

Projected combat aircraft

V-100

General information
- Type: twin-rotor combat helicopter
- National origin: Russia
- Manufacturer: Kamov
- Status: Cancelled design study

The V-100 was a projected side-by-side twin-rotor compound helicopter combat aircraft from Kamov. It had a pusher propeller located behind the rear tailplane, rotors mounted on the tips of its wings and two turbines mounted above the central fuselage, to have the aircraft exceed a projected speed of 400 km/h. Integral gun armament was planned to consist of two mobile AO-9 single barrel derivatives of the GSh-23 (one on each side) or a single fixed AO-10 (early version of the GSh-30-1). Other weapons would have included the Kh-25 missile and other stores on two high capacity fuselages and a total of six underwing hardpoints with a combined warload of up to 3000 kg. This project was abandoned and only one model of the aircraft exists.

== See also ==
Related development

- Kamov V-80
- Kamov Ka-50

Aircraft of comparable role, configuration, and era

- Mil Mi-42
- Lockheed AH-56 Cheyenne
