= AT-9 =

AT-9 may mean:

- Curtiss AT-9, aeroplane.
- AT-9 Spiral-2, missile.
- Vienna, a state of Austria; AT-9 is its ISO 3166-2:AT country subdivision code.
