= Thompson Lake =

Thompson Lake or Lake Thompson may refer to:

in Canada

- Thompson Lake (Manitoba)
- Thompson Lake (York Region, Ontario), near Wilcox Lake

in New Zealand

- Lake Thompson (Canterbury), one of New Zealand's lakes
- Lake Thompson (Southland), another of New Zealand's lakes

in the United States

- Thompson Lake (Arkansas)
- Lake Thompson (California)
- Thompson Lake (Maine)
- Thompson Lake (Meeker County, Minnesota)
- Thompson Lake (St. Louis County, Minnesota)
- Thompson Lake (Gallatin County, Montana), one of Gallatin County's lakes
- Thompson Lake (Granite County, Montana), one of Granite County's lakes
- Thompson Lake (Park County, Montana), one of Park County's lakes
- Lake Thompson (South Dakota)

== See also ==
- Thomsons Lake
- Thompson Pond
- Thompson's Lake (New York), abutted by Thompson's Lake State Park
- West Thompson Lake
