= Thomason =

Thomason may refer to:

== People ==
- Thomason (surname)

== Other uses ==
- University Medical Center (El Paso, Texas), formerly known as Thomason Hospital, a non-profit public hospital in El Paso, Texas
- Thomason Collection of English Civil War Tracts, a collection of material dating from 1640 to 1661
- USS John W. Thomason (DD-760), an Allen M. Sumner-class destroyer, United States Navy ship
- USS Thomason (DE-203), a Buckley-class destroyer escort of the United States Navy

== See also ==
- Thompson (surname)
- Thomsen
- Thomson (disambiguation)
- MacTavish Surname
- Clan MacTavish
