= Thompson Creek =

Thompson Creek may refer to:

- Thompson Creek (Chestatee River tributary), a stream in Georgia
- Thompson Creek (Root River tributary), a stream in Minnesota
- Thompson Creek (Oil Creek tributary), a stream in Crawford County, Pennsylvania
- Thompson Creek (Ararat River tributary), a stream in Patrick County, Virginia
- Thompson Creek (Nisqually River tributary), a stream in Washington
- Thompson Creek (Skookumchuck River tributary), a stream in Washington
- Thompson Creek (Santa Clara County, California)
- Thompson Creek (Siskiyou County, California)

== See also ==
- Thompson River (disambiguation)
