= Torzhok Air Base =

Military airfield in Torzhok, Russia

Torzhok
- Torzhok, Tver Oblast in Russia
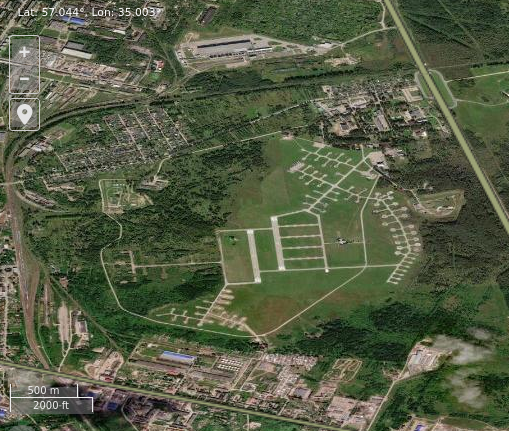
- Satellite imagery of Torzhok air base

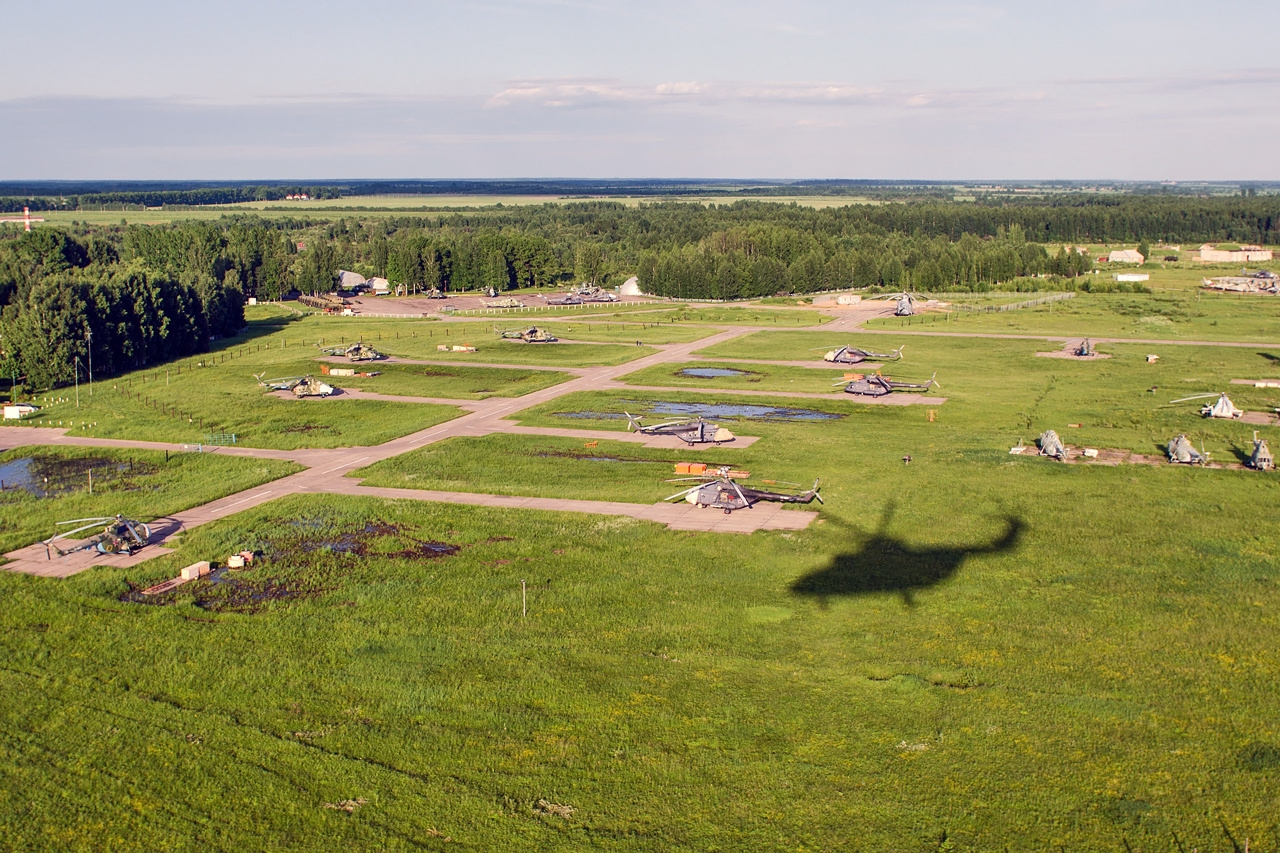

Site information
- Type: Air Base
- Owner: Ministry of Defence
- Operator: Russian Aerospace Forces

Location
- Shown within Tver Oblast Torzhok (Russia)
- Coordinates: 57°02′37″N 35°00′11″E

Site history
- In use: 2002 - present

Airfield information
- Identifiers: ICAO: XUET (UUET)
- Elevation: 169 metres (554 ft) AMSL
Runways
Direction	Length and surface
17L/35R	500 metres (1,640 ft) Concrete
17R/35L	500 metres (1,640 ft) Concrete

Torzhok (air base) is a military airfield located in Torzhok, Russia.

The base is home to the 696th Instructor Test Helicopter Regiment and the Aerobatic Team - Eagles, both as part of the 344th Centre for Combat use and Retraining of Flight Personnel of Army Aviation.

It has in residence the 344th Center for Combat Employment and Retraining of Personnel of Army Aviation. The center operates the "Golden Eagles" combat helicopter aerobatic team. The 696th Regiment tests all current models and modifications of Russian military helicopters. The center uses Ka-50, Mi-8, Mi-24, Mi-26, and Mil Mi-28Н helicopters for training purposes.

In 2002 the center consisted of:

- 696th Research-Instructor Helicopter Regiment (Troop Transport Helicopters) (Torzhok, Tver Oblast)
- 92nd Research-Instructor Helicopter Squadron (Sokol, Vladimir Oblast)
- 118th independent Helicopter Squadron (Chebenki, Orenburg Oblast) (though on 1.12.07 absorbed by the 4215th Aircraft Reserve Base)
- 2881st Helicopter Reserve Base (Totskoye-2, Orenburg Oblast)
- Kushalino test range (from 2005) (Military Unit: 15478)

The Center has a helicopter museum. Tours are organized by prior agreement with the leadership of the military unit.

Every year, the center hosts an "Open Day" for residents and guests of the city.

== See also ==
- List of military airbases in Russia
