= Kamov V-80 =

Russian attack helicopter design

The Kamov V-80 was a design study designation for an attack helicopter that eventually evolved into the single seat Kamov Ka-50 family of aircraft.

== Design and development ==
Design of the V-80 (later Ka-50) began at the Kamov Helicopter Plant in 1971. The program was run by the head of the design bureau, Chief Designer Sergey Mikheyev, who was later to become Designer General. In the beginning, the main purpose envisioned for the V-80 was to cover ground troops on the battlefield by fighting enemy aircraft. Hence, it was expected to be armed with a fixed cannon and air-to-air missiles.

In 1976, in response to the American attack helicopter competition that was won by the AH-64 Apache, the Soviets ordered a similar helicopter from the Mil Moscow Helicopter Plant design bureau. The Kamov design bureau offered to develop another helicopter of the same class. Hence, a competition between the two design bureaus was announced. At that time, both had already gained valuable experience in designing and producing rotary-wing aircraft.

Kamov's entry for that competition resembled the 1971 V-80 design and kept the same designation; it was also known as "Izdeliye 800". The design was presented to the air force in December 1977, and it was approved. Then, a full-size mock-up was built. It was approved in May 1980, and in August of the same year, Kamov was ordered to build two test helicopters. Kamov designers believed that combining the duties of flying, navigation, target detection, and tracking could be automated to a degree that a single crew member could perform all functions. After analysing the work of the pilot and weapons system operator in the Mil Mi-24, they concluded that during combat, one of the two crew members was often unnecessary. Moreover, Kamov helicopters always had a high level of automation; the Kamov Ka-25 could already be operated by a single pilot. A single-person crew allowed for a significantly reduced weight. The saved weight was partly spent on improving the firepower and the survivability, and simplifying the maintenance of the helicopter.

The use of coaxial rotors had the effect of increasing manoeuvrability, reducing the vibrations level, and making the silhouette smaller. The helicopter also lacked a vulnerable tail rotor. The following measures to enhance pilot survivability were taken:

• The engines were placed on both sides of the airframe to prevent a single hit from destroying both engines

• The helicopter could fly on a single engine in various modes

• The cockpit was armored and screened with combined steel/aluminum armor and armored Plexiglas

• The hydraulic steering system compartment was armored and screened

• Vital units were screened by less important ones

• Self-sealing fuel tanks were filled with polyurethane

• Composites were used to preserve the helicopter's efficiency when its load-bearing elements are damaged

• A two-contour rotor-blade spar was developed

• Control rod diameter was increased by positioning most of them inside the armored cockpit

• The powerplant and compartments adjacent to the fuel tanks were fire-protected

• The transmission is capable of operating for 30 minutes if the oil system is damaged

• The power supply systems, control circuits, etc. were made redundant and placed on opposite sides of the airframe

• Individual protection is provided to the pilot

The armor consisted of spaced-aluminum plates with a total weight of more than 300 kg. The armor is fitted into the fuselage load-bearing structure, which reduces the total weight of the helicopter. GosNIIAS tests confirmed the pilot's protection up to 20mm caliber cannon rounds and shell fragments.

A unique feature of this helicopter is the use of a rocket-parachute ejection system in case of an emergency. The helicopter emergency-escape system uses the K-37-800 ejection seat that was developed by the Zvezda Scientific Production Association (Chief Designer Guy Severin). The pilot's safety was also ensured by the undercarriage design. The undercarriage is capable of absorbing large loads in an emergency landing, and the cockpit has a crunch zone of up to 10–15% upon impact. Additionally, the fuel system is designed to remove the possibility of fire after a rough landing.

A model of an earlier design from around 1975 shows a two-seat aircraft with an airframe similar to that of the V-60, a pair of widely spaced downward facing vertical stabilisers, a fixed GSh-23L forward firing gun in the fuselage and two stub wings incorporating one hardpoint each and a pod containing the retractable undercarriage. Further studies include novel features such as a variable azimuth stub wing, a biplane stub wing/canard configuration, additional fuselage hardpoints, ejecting exhaust on either side of the tail to reduce the heat signature, making the forward firing gun depressible and single seat as well as two seat configurations. Specification weight was 4000 kg empty and 6500 kg takeoff.

The first V-80 prototype (Bort 010) left the Kamov Helicopter Plant in June 1982. On 17 June, for the first time, test pilot Nikolay Bezdetnov performed a hover in the V-80 and on 27 July the V-80 made its maiden circuit flight.

The V-80Sh-1 prototype version was the configuration used for the Ka-50 production version. Production of the attack helicopter was ordered by the Soviet Council of Ministers on 14 December 1987. Following initial flight testing and system tests the Council ordered the first batch of the helicopter in 1990. The attack helicopter was first described publicly as the "Ka-50" in March 1992 at a symposium in the United Kingdom.

== See also ==
Related development

- Kamov Ka-25F
- Kamov V-60
- Kamov V-100
- Kamov Ka-50
