= 9K121 Vikhr =

Soviet/Russian air-to-surface missile

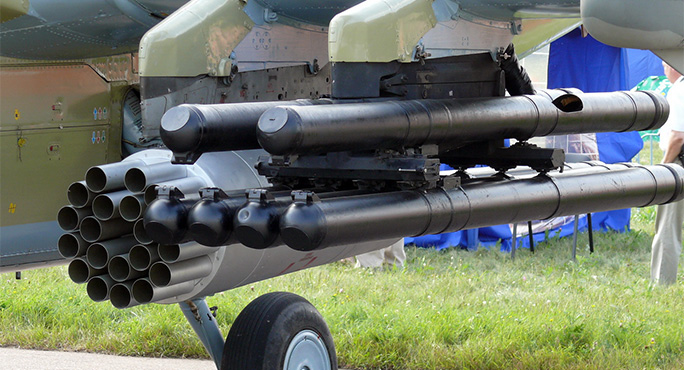
- Vikhr missile transport and launching tubes
- Type: Air-launched Anti-Air/Tank Missile
- Place of origin: Soviet Union

Service history
- In service: 1985–present
- Used by: Russian Air Force; Egyptian Air Force
- Wars: Russian invasion of Ukraine

Production history
- Manufacturer: KBP Instrument Design Bureau
- Unit cost: Unknown
- Produced: 1985–present

Specifications
- Mass: 45 kg
- Length: 2.80 m
- Diameter: 130 mm
- Wingspan: 380 mm
- Warhead: 8–12 kg tandem HEAT charge, armor penetration behind ERA, 1,000 mm; or 750mm
- Detonation mechanism: Proximity and Impact
- Engine: Solid-fuel rocket
- Propellant: Solid fuel
- Operational range: 10–12 km
- Maximum speed: 610m/s, Mach 1.8
- Guidance system: Laser beam riding
- Launch platform: Helicopters: Mi-28NM; Ka-50; Ka-52; Aircraft: Su-25T/25TM; Ships: AK-630 Vikhr-K

The 9K121 Vikhr (Russian: Вихрь, English: Whirlwind; NATO reporting name: AT-16 Scallion) is a Soviet laser-beam-riding anti-tank missile. "9K121" is the GRAU designation for the missile system. The missile can be launched from warships, Ka-50 and Ka-52 helicopters, and Su-25T aircraft, and has a range of approximately 10km. It was first shown publicly at the 1992 Farnborough Airshow.

== Description ==
The missile is designed to engage vital ground targets, including armoured targets fitted out with built-in and add-on explosive reactive armor, at a range of up to 8 km when fired from a helicopter and 10 km when fired from a fixed-wing aircraft in daytime and up to 5 km at night, as well as air targets in conditions of air defense assets activity.

The Vikhr-1 missile is part of the Vikhr-M system, which also includes an automatic sight and a depressible launcher. Adopted in 1990, the missile was upgraded in 2021.

The automatic sight is provided with TV and IR channels for target sighting, a laser beam channel for missile control, a laser rangefinder, an automatic target tracking unit, a digital computer and a system for stabilization and aiming the sighting and beam channels. The automatic sight provides for target detection and identification both by day and night, automatic target tracking and missile guidance, and generates exact information for gun and rocket firing. The guided missile consists of a HEAT fragmentation warhead fitted with a contact and a proximity fuze, an air-dynamic control actuator, control electronics, a motor and laser detector. It is kept in a sealed launching transporting container.

The multi-purpose warhead (two-stage HEAT and an additional fragmentation sleeve) allows the missile to be used against armoured, airborne and area targets alike. This is an advantage compared to the three different missiles required in the 9M120 Ataka-V complex. It's 8kg warhead provides 750mm of armor penetration.

The Vikhr missile utilizes laser guidance to precisely reach targets. This laser designation is usually provided by air sources or ground based lasers. The laser guidance principle is identical to that used by 9M117 Bastion or 9M119 Svir antiarmor missiles. The Vikhr missile control system has low jamming susceptibility because its receiver faces the carrier, thereby protecting it from most jamming signals.

The missiles can be fired singly or in pairs (at the same target to increase lethality). The high flight speed allows it to engage targets rapidly. Most Vikhr-carrying aircraft utilize the Skhval targeting system and are capable of launching Vikhr missiles against two to four targets during a 30-second period and starting at a range of 10 km, which increases its lethality to three to four times that of earlier systems. Overall, the Vikhr missile has a 95% accuracy rate against stationary targets, and 80% on those moving.

== Design ==
The 9K121 Vikhr follows the typical design of Soviet air-to-ground missiles. It has a long, cylindrical body with a cruciform set of tail fins and canards. It has a conical tip, with a small hole, which provides airspeed information necessary for its unusual guidance system.

There are two rocket engines on the aft end, and two small rocket engines mounted radially just forward of the midpoint of the missile. These two rocket engines are pointed equally away from the boresight of the missile, causing it to spin. This spin provides the ability for the missile to steer itself. Unlike air-to-air missiles which need all four canards to be able to move in order to be highly agile and stable in flight, the 9K121 has only one moving canard.

The spin imparted by the two forward rocket motors cause the missile to spin along its trajectory. If the laser detector detects that the missile is veering off of the laser beam provided by the guiding aircraft, the sole moving canard in the front of the missile angles itself causing the front to try and have a different rate of roll than the back of the missile. This leads to instability in the missile's spin, making it 'wobble', similar to an improperly thrown (American) football. When the missile has a desirable attitude in its wobbling pattern, the canard straightens. This stabilizes the spin of the missile, now having it point in the desired direction. This results in an erratic flight pattern, although the missile itself is highly accurate.

The missile is outfitted with a 4kg-5.5kg high explosive tandem charge, which proves effective against armored, semi armored, and non armored targets. It is also effective against airborne targets, although the beam-riding guidance system of the VIkhr makes it difficult to accurately hit fast-moving targets such as jets as opposed to slow airborne targets such as supply helicopters.

The aft end of the missile contains two laser detectors, located radially between the two aft rocket engines. The spinning motion of the missile allows the missile to compare the difference in detected strength as it spins, and correct itself to stay within the laserbeam provided by the guiding vehicle.

== Variants ==
- 9A1472 Vikhr-1 – Upgraded version. Supplies to the Russian troops started in 2015.

== Operators ==
- Egypt
- Russia
- Soviet Union (former)

== Operational history ==
In June 2023, a military analyst said to Tass that the Vikhr could destroy "any Western tank transferred to Ukraine", in the battle to repel the Russian invasion of Ukraine.

In August 2024, while the Ukrainian incursion into Kursk raged on, footage emerged of a Mi-28 night-time sortie during which the helicopter attacked tanks with its Vikhr missiles.

== See also ==
- AGM-114 Hellfire
- Brimstone
- Ataka
- Hermes (missile)
- Izdeliye 305
