= Mil Mi-42 =

Projected assault/transport helicopter

Mi-42

General information
- Type: Assault / Transport Helicopter
- National origin: USSR
- Manufacturer: Mil

History
- Developed from: Mil Mi-40

The Mil Mi-42 was a projected assault/transport helicopter featuring the NOTAR concept, fit to replace the Mi-40 program. The Mi-40 did not attract that many customers. Because of this and other reasons, the Mi-42 program (originally part of the Mi-40 program) was launched in 1985. The entire Mi-40 program, including the Mi-42 program, was cancelled after the collapse of the Soviet Union.

== Design and development ==
Starting in 1985 a further development along the lines of the Mil Mi-40 was sought which would provide higher performance in the "Aerial Infantry Fighting Vehicle" category.

Primary roles included landing troops, providing rapid redeployment, escort, close air support and tactical strikes. Its secondary roles would include transport of equipment, medivac, SAR/CSAR, reconnaissance and communications. Requirements specified day, night and all weather capability as well as diverse operating conditions. In addition, the craft was to run on standard diesel fuel, to be easy to maintain and simple to pilot.

A vectoring NOTAR system would replace the tail rotor. It was hoped that this would be more durable and increase safety of people working in the vicinity of the tail. Finally, it was planned that, as the aircraft picked up speed and aerodynamic forces began to have a stabilising effect, the vectoring system would angle the NOTAR nozzle so that it faced straight backward – hopefully allowing the Mi-42 to achieve its required top speed of 380–400 km/h (240–250 mph).

The design was intended to be heavily armoured and carry a mobile forward firing cannon and four hardpoints (equivalent armament to the Mil Mi-28 gunship).

As a result of the complex requirements (essentially those of a truck, transport helicopter, attack helicopter and strike aircraft combined) the design continuously took on increasing complexity and weight. Attempts were made to improve the powerplant and replace the NOTAR system with a series of powered fans. In the end, it was Mil that concluded that the specifications were impossible to meet. The design reached the mock-up stage but apparently ceased toward the end of the 1980s, although attempts were made in the 1990s to restart a less ambitious design based on the Mil Mi-40.

== See also ==
Aircraft of comparable role, configuration, and era

- Kamov V-100
- AH-56 Cheyenne
