= Thompson Lake (Meeker County, Minnesota) =

Lake in the state of Minnesota, United States

- Location within Minnesota
- Location: Meeker County, Minnesota
- Coordinates: 44°56′32.5″N 94°43′25″W
- Type: lake

Thompson Lake is a lake in Meeker County, in the U.S. state of Minnesota.

Thompson Lake bears the name of a pioneer settler.

== See also ==
- List of lakes in Minnesota
