= Thompson Creek (Siskiyou County, California) =

Stream in Siskiyou County, California, U.S.

Coordinates: 41°51′49″N 123°18′30″W

Thompson Creek is a stream in Siskiyou County, California, which is a tributary to the Klamath River.
