= Thomson Reservoir =

Thomson Reservoir may refer to

- Thomson Reservoir, created by Thomson Dam in Victoria, Australia
- Thomson Reservoir, created by Thomson Dam (Minnesota), United States
- Thompson Reservoir (Oregon), in Lake County, Oregon, United States
