= Thompson Township =

Thompson Township may refer to:

== Canada ==
- Thompson Township, Algoma District, Ontario

== United States ==
=== Arkansas ===
- Thompson Township, Pike County, Arkansas, in Pike County, Arkansas

=== Illinois ===
- Thompson Township, Jo Daviess County, Illinois

=== Iowa ===
- Thompson Township, Guthrie County, Iowa

=== Michigan ===
- Thompson Township, Schoolcraft County, Michigan

=== Minnesota ===
- Thompson Township, Kittson County, Minnesota

=== North Carolina ===
- Thompson Township, Robeson County, North Carolina, in Robeson County, North Carolina

=== Ohio ===
- Thompson Township, Delaware County, Ohio
- Thompson Township, Geauga County, Ohio
- Thompson Township, Seneca County, Ohio

=== Pennsylvania ===
- Thompson Township, Fulton County, Pennsylvania
- Thompson Township, Susquehanna County, Pennsylvania

== See also ==
- Thompson (disambiguation)
- Thomson Township (disambiguation)
