= USS Thompson =

USS Thompson may refer to:

- USS Thompson (DD-305), named for Richard Wigginton Thompson and served in the 1920s; currently an exposed shipwreck in San Francisco Bay.
- USS Thompson (DD-627), named for Robert Means Thompson and served during World War II and the Korean War

== See also ==
- USS Smith Thompson (DD-212), named for U.S. Supreme Court Justice Smith Thompson, in service from 1919 to 1936
