= Thompson Lake (St. Louis County, Minnesota) =

Lake in the state of Minnesota, United States

- Location within Minnesota
- Location: St. Louis County, Minnesota
- Coordinates: 47°5′5″N 92°3′53″W
- Type: lake

Thompson Lake is a lake in St. Louis County, in the U.S. state of Minnesota.

Thompson Lake bears the name of a lumberman who worked in the area.

== See also ==
- List of lakes in Minnesota
