= Thomson Directories =

Thomson Directories Ltd
- Company type: Private company
- Industry: Telephone directory
- Headquarters: Farnborough, Hampshire, UK
- Products: Thomson Local
- Owner: US West (1994–1999); Apax Partners (1999–13); Corporate Media Partners (2013–)
- Parent: Corporate Media Partners
- Subsidiaries: Thomson Local; ThomsonLocal.com
- Website: www.thomsonlocal.com
- Footnotes / references acquired by Corporate Media Partners

Thomson Directories, more commonly referred to as Thomson Local, is a local business directory company based in Farnborough, Hampshire, England, and offers business listings both in print and online following the launch of ThomsonLocal.com in 2003.

174 regional editions of the Thomson Local are produced and delivered free of charge to residential and commercial addresses throughout the UK.

US West, a telecommunications company in the United States, purchased the company from Dun & Bradstreet and Thomson Corporation in 1994.

In 1999, the company was sold by 3i to TDL Infomedia, a subsidiary of Apax Partners.

The company was placed in administration in August 2013, and acquired by Corporate Media Partners.

As of 2017 Thomson Local operates from their new head office in the Templer building of Farnborough Business Park overlooking Farnborough Airport.
