= Thomson Local =

- Company type: Private company
- Industry: telephone directory
- Founded: 1981; 45 years ago
- Headquarters: Thomson House Farnborough, Hampshire, England; Templer building of Farnborough Business Park, Farnborough, Hampshire, UK
- Parent: Thomson Directories
- Website: www.thomsonlocal.com

Thomson Local is a local business telephone directory, published up until 2016 in the United Kingdom by Thomson Directories Ltd from its former head office at Thomson House in Farnborough, Hampshire.

It is the principal rival (and for the 1980s and some of the 1990s the sole rival) to the Yellow Pages (published by Thomson as the Thomson Yellow Pages until it was sold to the privatised BT).

The printed directory was distributed without charge to households and businesses, reaching some 22 million homes and businesses at its peak.

As of 2016 the company ceased the production and delivery of printed directories, opting instead to offer their services digitally.

Thomson Local is a focused local area directory which has continually innovated with features such as colour and knock-out white advertisements. It was the first such directory in the UK to contain added value features such as local maps, local guides, and additional useful information beyond the actual business listings themselves.

Thomson Directories Ltd was originally formed to publish the Thomson Local in 1980 by The Thomson Corporation (after it had sold its Thomson Yellow Pages business) and Dun & Bradstreet, in partnership. After trials in several areas, the Thomson Local was first published throughout Great Britain in 1981. It was owned by Seat Pagine Gialle S.p.A. of Italy until both companies fell into administration in August 2013. Thomson Local's assets were purchased by telephone data company Corporate Media Partners, preserving more than 300 jobs but with 170 redundancies.

In the 1990s, the company expanded its operations to include its own online directory in the shape of thomsonlocal.com and a range of partner implementations supplying classified and keyword based listings to companies such as MSN, StreetMap, Pipex and many others.

In July 2010, Thomson Local signed a multi-year agreement to become the UK's first re-seller of adCenter, the pay-per-click platform for Microsoft's search engine Bing. Later that year, the company launched the thomsonlocal.com app for iPhone which has since been discontinued.

As of 2017 Thomson Local operates from their new head office in the Templer building of Farnborough Business Park overlooking Farnborough Airport.
