= Thompson Hall =

Thompson Hall may refer to:

- A building at Washington & Jefferson College
- John F. Thompson Hall, a building at the University of Massachusetts Amherst
- Thompson Hall (University of New Hampshire), listed on the National Register of Historic Places in Strafford County, New Hampshire
