= 9M120 Ataka =

Soviet/Russian anti-tank guided missile

9M120 Ataka AT-9 Spiral-2
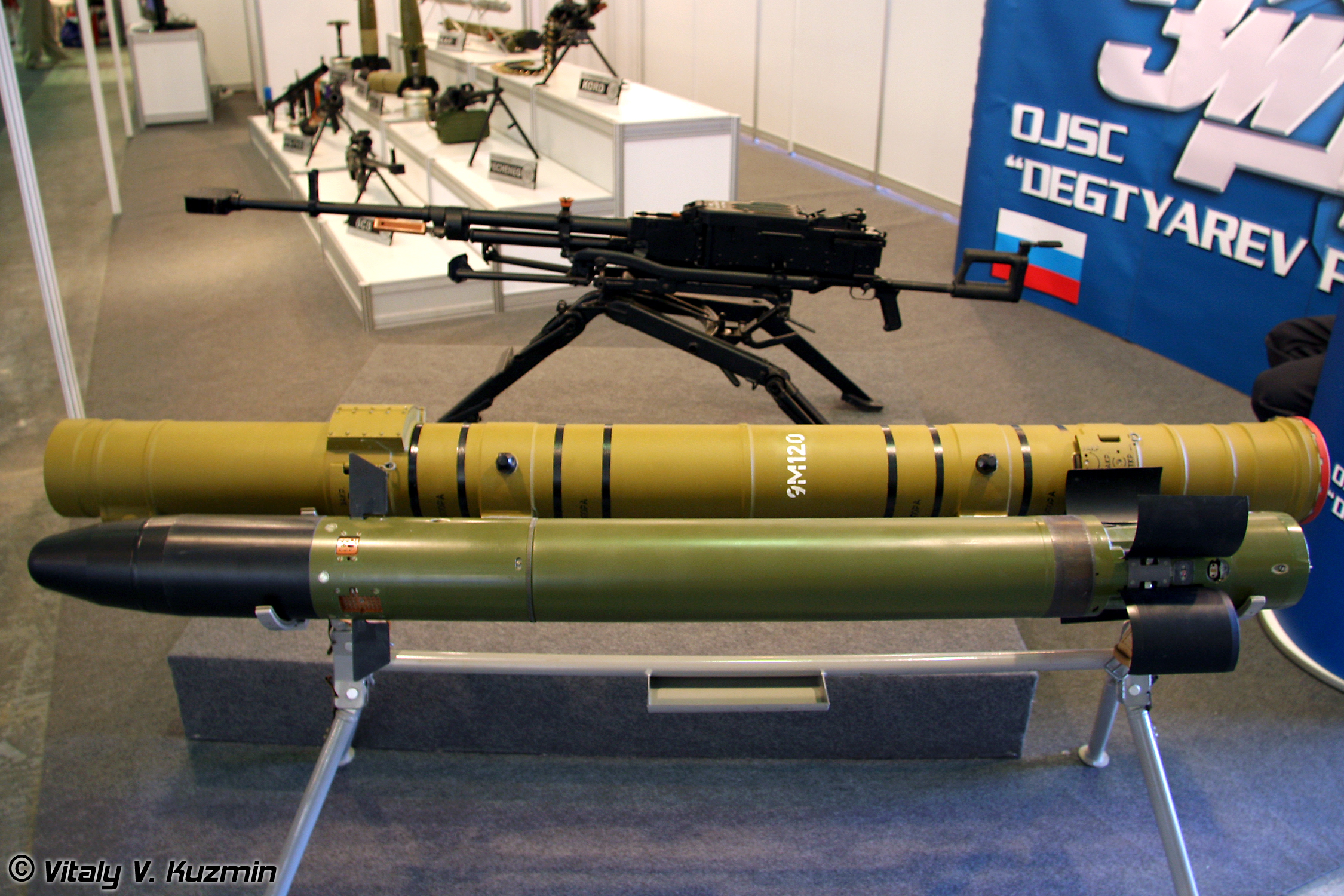
- 9M120 missile with tandem HEAT warhead
- Type: Anti-tank guided missile
- Place of origin: Soviet Union

Service history
- In service: 1985–present
- Used by: See Operators

Production history
- Designer: KBM
- Designed: 1980
- Manufacturer: Degtyarev plant
- Developed from: 9K114 Shturm
- Produced: 1980s–present
- Variants: See Variants

Specifications (9M120 Ataka)
- Mass: 49.5 kg (109 lb)
- Length: 1,830 mm (72 in)
- Diameter: 130 mm (5.1 in)
- Wingspan: 360 mm (14 in)
- Warhead: HEAT tandem warhead
- Warhead weight: 7.4 kg (16 lb)
- Detonation mechanism: Impact
- Operational range: 0.4–6 km (0.25–3.73 mi)
- Flight ceiling: 0–4,000 m (2.5 mi)
- Maximum speed: 550 m/s (1,800 ft/s; Mach 1.6), maximum 400 m/s (1,300 ft/s; Mach 1.2), average
- Guidance system: Radio command link SACLOS
- Accuracy: 0.65–0.9 hit probability against an MBT from a distance of 4 km.
- Launch platform: Armored fighting vehicles and helicopters

The 9M120 Ataka (Russian: Атака; Attack) is an anti-tank guided missile (ATGM) originating from the Soviet Union. The NATO reporting name of the 9M120 missile is the AT-9 Spiral-2. It is the next major generation in the 9K114 Shturm (AT-6 Spiral) family. The missile has radio command guidance and is also a beam riding SACLOS. This missile's primary variant was designed to defeat tanks with composite armour and explosive reactive armor. The 9M120 Ataka system is often confused with the 9K121 Vikhr system, despite being different weapons systems developed by different companies. The former was designed by the KBM machine-building design bureau and manufactured by the Degtyarev plant. According to the Stockholm International Peace Research Institute, Russia exported the Ataka ATGM to Iran, Kazakhstan, and Slovenia.

== Development ==
The 9M120 missile was developed by the Kolomna engineering design bureau, located in Kolomna. This company already designed previous ATGMs, such as the 9M14 Malyutka and 9M114 Kokon missiles. The design work began in the mid 1980s. The Ataka ATGM was designed as a successor model to and a further development of the 9K114 Shturm, which was introduced in the late 1970s. Compared to its predecessor, the AT-9 is more resistant to electronic countermeasures, and has a greater hit accuracy and longer reach. The newly developed warhead allows for increased penetration power and effectiveness against explosive reactive armor. The first units were delivered in 1985 to the Soviet armed forces.

The missile has often been confused in the West with the 9A4172 Vikhr dual-purpose laser beam riding missile used on the Kamov helicopters and Sukhoi attack aircraft. These systems are completely unrelated in their design. New light multifunctional guided missiles with increased range – up to 25 kilometers – have been developed and received for Russian attack helicopters on the outcomes of the military operation in Syria.

== Description ==
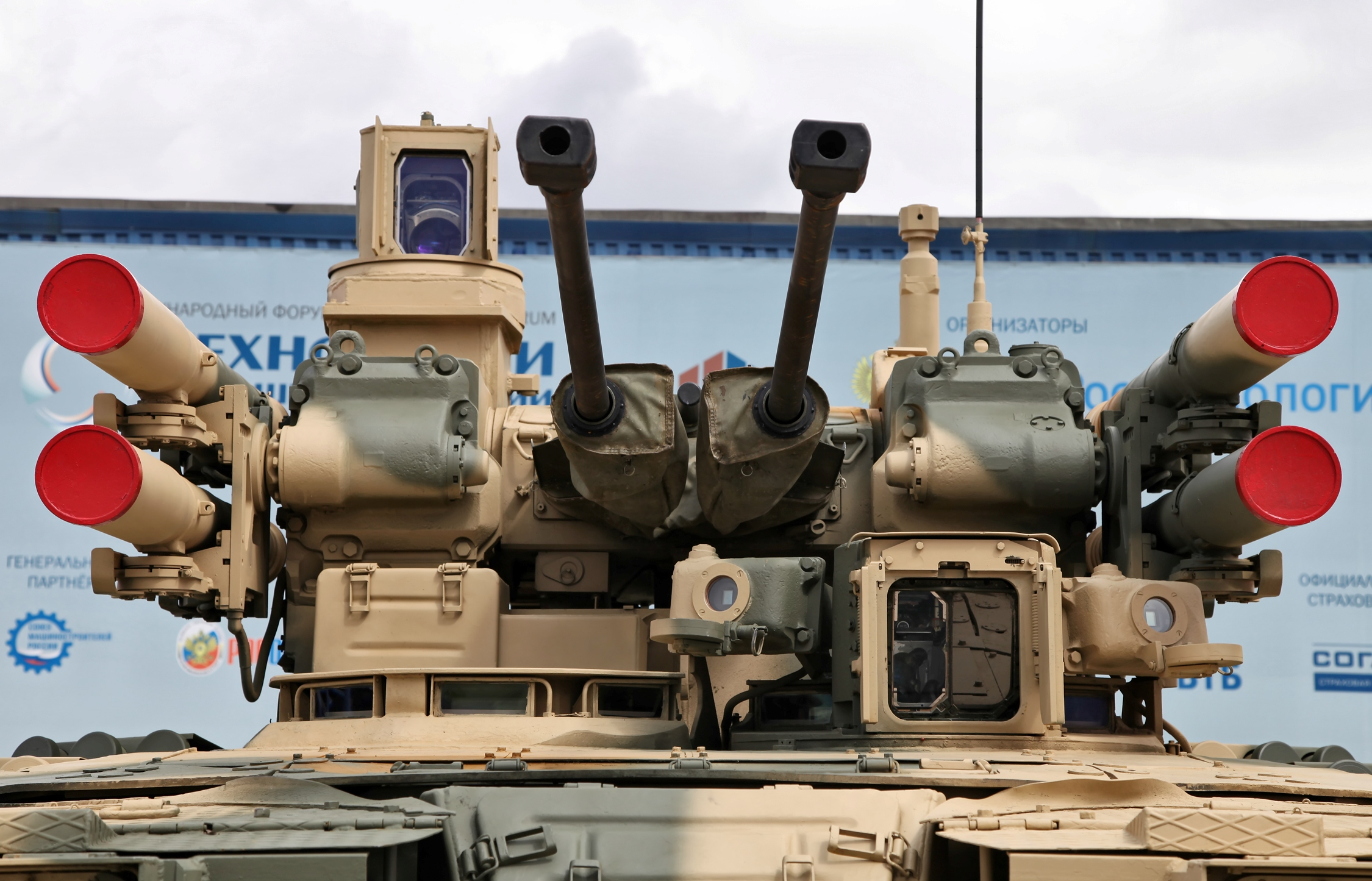
The primary armaments of the BMPT include four Ataka-T missiles with two mounted on each side.

The Ataka missile is stored in a glass reinforced plastic tube, which also acts as its launcher. The missile is reported to be considerably faster than the 9K114 Shturm, with longer range than the original version. It still uses radio command guidance, but the system has been improved when compared to the earlier 9K114 Shturm.

The system is carried by the multiple kinds of helicopters including the Mi-28 and Mi-35. It is also offered for ground vehicles like the BMPT and the 9P149.

There are three main missiles that are compatible with the launch system. The first is a two-stage anti-armour weapon that features a tandem warhead for dealing with add-on armor. The second variant of the missile – designated as 9M120F – has a thermobaric warhead for use against infantry positions and bunkers. The third variant of the 9M120 Ataka is the 9M220, which features a proximity fused expanding rod warhead, providing the missile with Surface-to-Air capability against low- and slow-flying aircraft.

== Variants ==
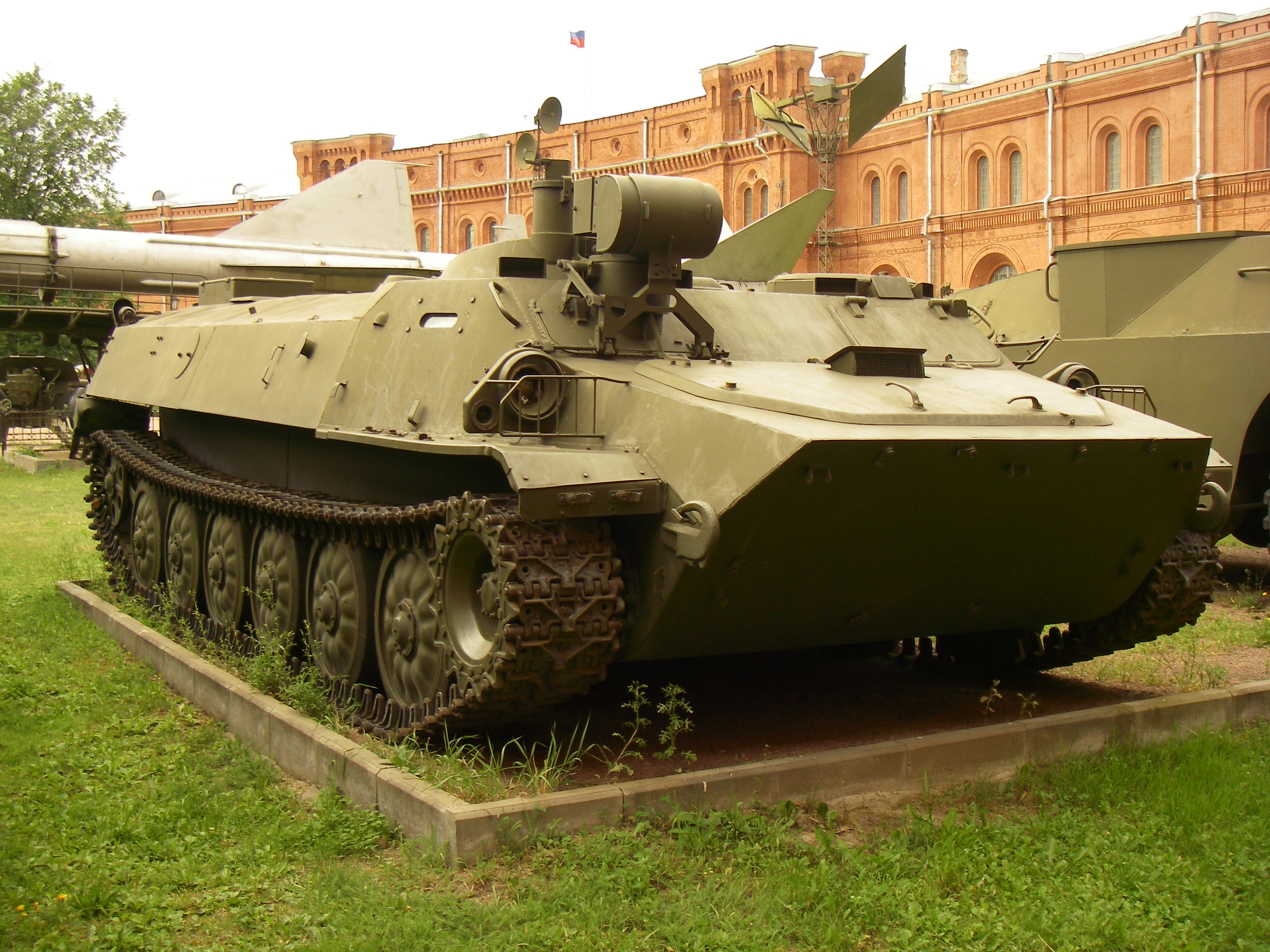
The 9P149 combat vehicle carries 12 Ataka missiles.

- 9M120 Ataka "AT-9 Spiral-2" SACLOS radio command guidance missile.
  - 9M120 – This variant features a tandem HEAT warhead to defeat current and future armored fighting vehicles equipped with ERA.
  - 9M120F – This variant uses a thermobaric warhead for greater effect against buildings, unarmored targets, and bunkers.
  - 9M220O – This variant is included with an expanding rod warhead for use against helicopters. It is equipped with a proximity fuse to destroy aircraft, and detonates its fragmentation warhead when less than four meters from the target.
  - 9M120M – A modernized variant with an extended range of 8,000 m. The improved warhead can penetrate over 950 mm of RHA after ERA.
  - 9M120D – An improved variant with a range of 10 km
- 9M120-1 Ataka – Upgraded Ataka missiles used by Ataka-T GWS.
- 9M127-1 Ataka-VM - New air to surface version for helicopters.

== General specifications ==
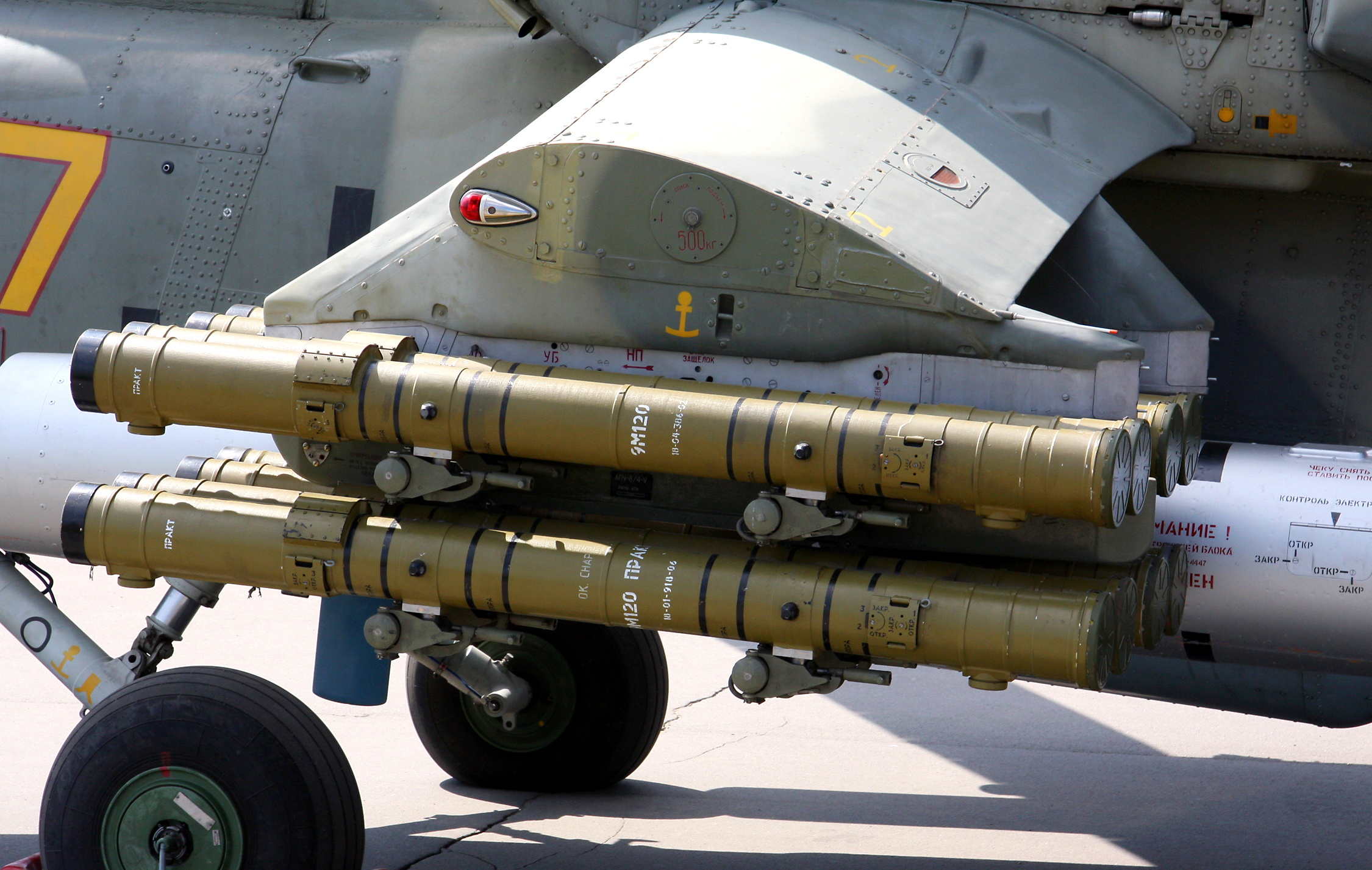
The Mi-28 attack helicopter carries 16 Ataka missiles for anti-tank missions.

Designation	Description	Length	Diameter	Wingspan	Launch weight	Warhead	Armor penetration, RHA	Range	Speed
9M120	Original variant	1,830 mm (72 in)	130 mm (5.1 in)	360 mm (14 in)	49.5 kg (109 lb)	7.4 kg (16 lb) tandem HEAT	800 mm (31 in) after ERA	0.4–6 km (0.25–3.73 mi)	550 m/s (1,800 ft/s; Mach 1.6), top speed 400 m/s (1,300 ft/s; Mach 1.2), average
9M120F	Anti-personnel variant	1,830 mm (72 in)	130 mm (5.1 in)	360 mm (14 in)	49.5 kg (109 lb)	Thermobaric warhead with 9.5 kg (21 lb) TNT equivalent	—N/a	1–5.8 km (0.62–3.60 mi)	550 m/s (1,800 ft/s; Mach 1.6), top speed 400 m/s (1,300 ft/s; Mach 1.2), average
9M220O	Anti-air variant	1,830 mm (72 in)	130 mm (5.1 in)	360 mm (14 in)	49.5 kg (109 lb)	Proximity Fuse	—N/a	0.4–7 km (0.25–4.35 mi)	550 m/s (1,800 ft/s; Mach 1.6), top speed 400 m/s (1,300 ft/s; Mach 1.2), average
9M120M	Modernized anti-tank variant	1,830 mm (72 in)	130 mm (5.1 in)	360 mm (14 in)	49.5 kg (109 lb)	7.4 kg (16 lb) tandem HEAT	950 mm (37 in) after ERA	0.8–8 km (0.50–4.97 mi)	550 m/s (1,800 ft/s; Mach 1.6), top speed 400 m/s (1,300 ft/s; Mach 1.2), average

== Operators ==
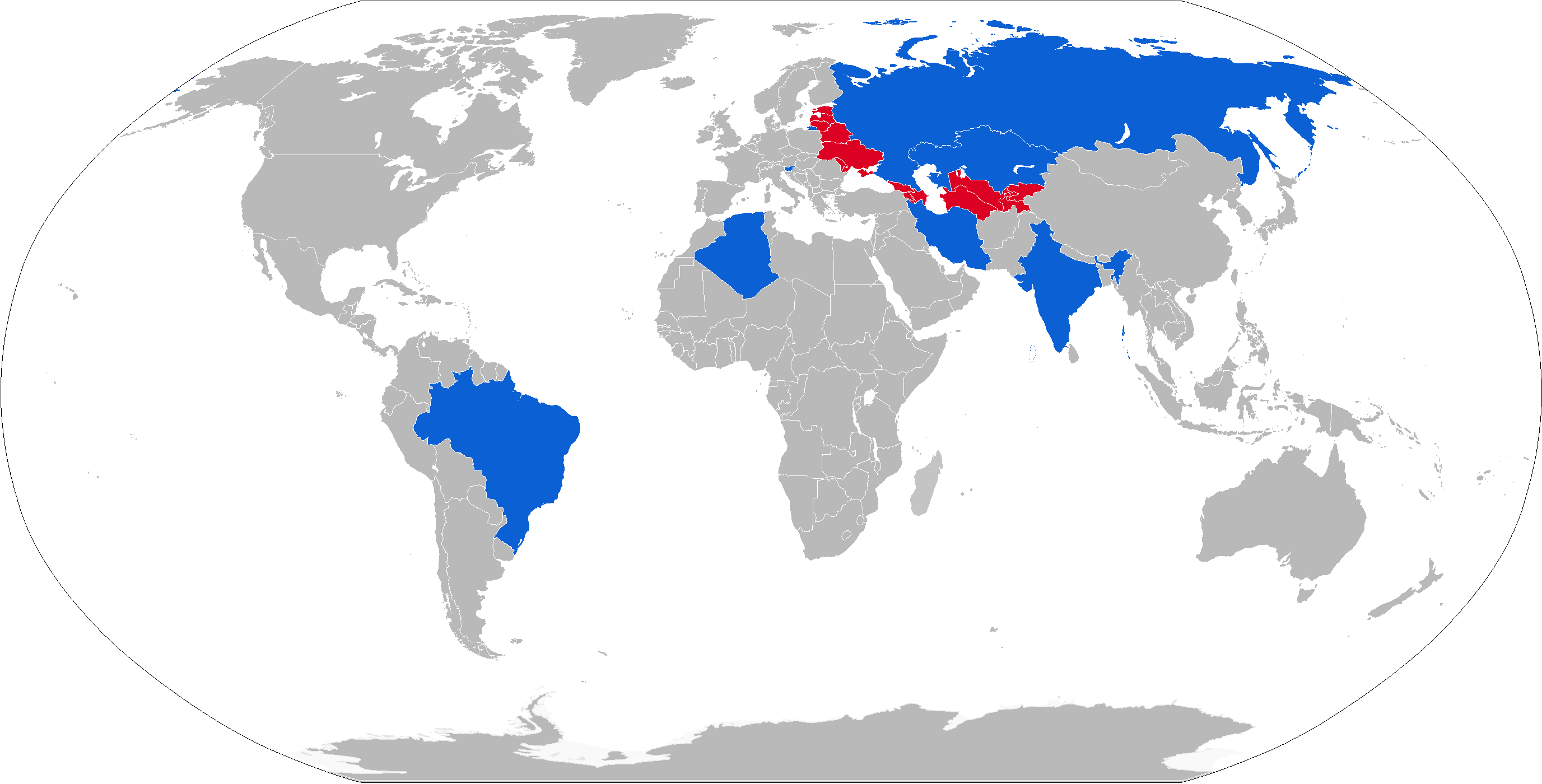
M9M120 operators: Current Former

=== Current operators ===
Algeria

- Algerian Air Force – used on Mi-24MKIII, Mi 171Sh2 and Mil Mi-28 helicopters.
- Algerian Ground Forces – used on the BMPT Terminator.

Azerbaijan

- Azerbaijani Air Forces – used on Mil Mi-35M helicopters.

Belarus

- Armed Forces of Belarus

Egypt

- Egyptian Air Force - used on Ka-52 and Mil Mi-24 helicopters.

India

- Indian Air Force - Purchased in July 2019, deliveries began in December 2019. 20 Mil Mi-35 helicopters have been modified to deploy the missile as of July 2024.

Indonesia

- Indonesian Army – Used on Mi-35P attack helicopters.

Iran

- Iranian Air Force – In 1999, 500 AT-6 Spiral missiles were ordered for the Mi-171Sh. The delivery started in 2000 and ended in 2003 with some of these missiles possibly being AT-9 Spiral-2s.

Kazakhstan

- Armed Forces of the Republic of Kazakhstan – 120 missiles were ordered in 2010 for the BMPT tank support vehicle. In 2011, 40 were delivered.

Russia

- Russian Armed Forces – Operated on a wide range of vehicles ranging from helicopters to ATGM carriers.

Serbia

- Serbian Air Force and Air Defence – used on Mi-35 attack helicopters.

Slovenia

- Slovenian Armed Forces – Six launchers were ordered in 2009 and mounted on patrol boat "Triglav" the following year.

Syria

- Syrian Armed Forces – used on the BMPT Terminator.

Venezuela

- Venezuelan Army Aviation used on Mil Mi-35M2 helicopters.

=== Possible operators ===
Democratic People's Republic of Korea

=== Former operators ===
Brazil

- Brazilian Air Force – used on Mil Mi-35 helicopters.

Soviet Union – Passed on to successor states.

== See also ==
- AGM-114 Hellfire – (United States)
- 9K121 Vikhr – (Soviet Union)
- 9M123 Khrizantema – (Russia)
- PARS 3 LR – (Germany)
- Spike – (Israel)
- 9K114 Shturm – (Soviet Union)
