= L.H. Thomson =

- Trade name: Thomson
- Industry: Aerospace industry
- Founded: 1968; 58 years ago
- Founder: Ronnie and Margaret Thomson
- Headquarters: Macon, Georgia
- Products: Aircraft and bicycle parts
- Website: https://www.lhthomson.com/, https://www.bikethomson.com/

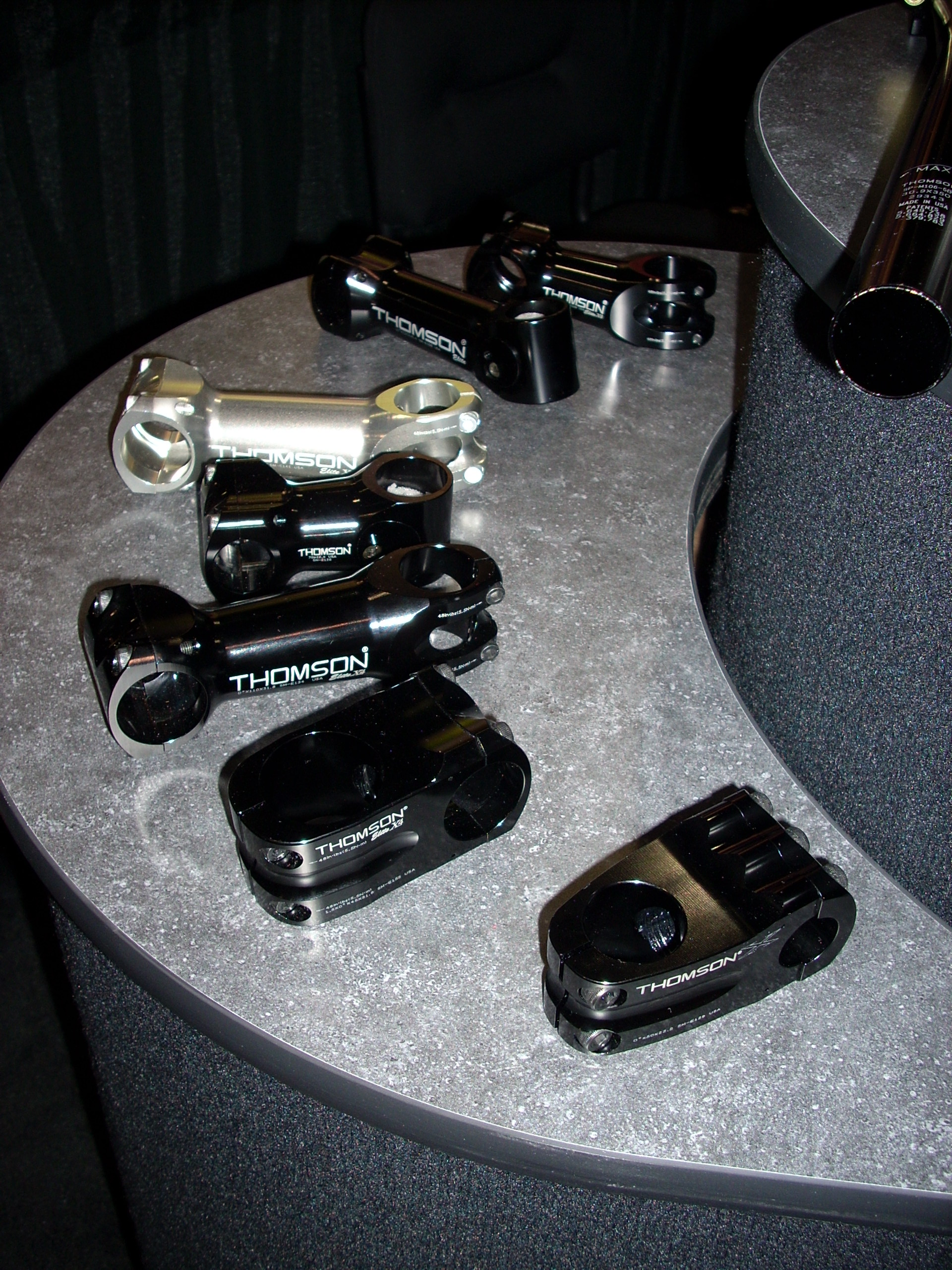
A selection of Thomson bicycle stems.

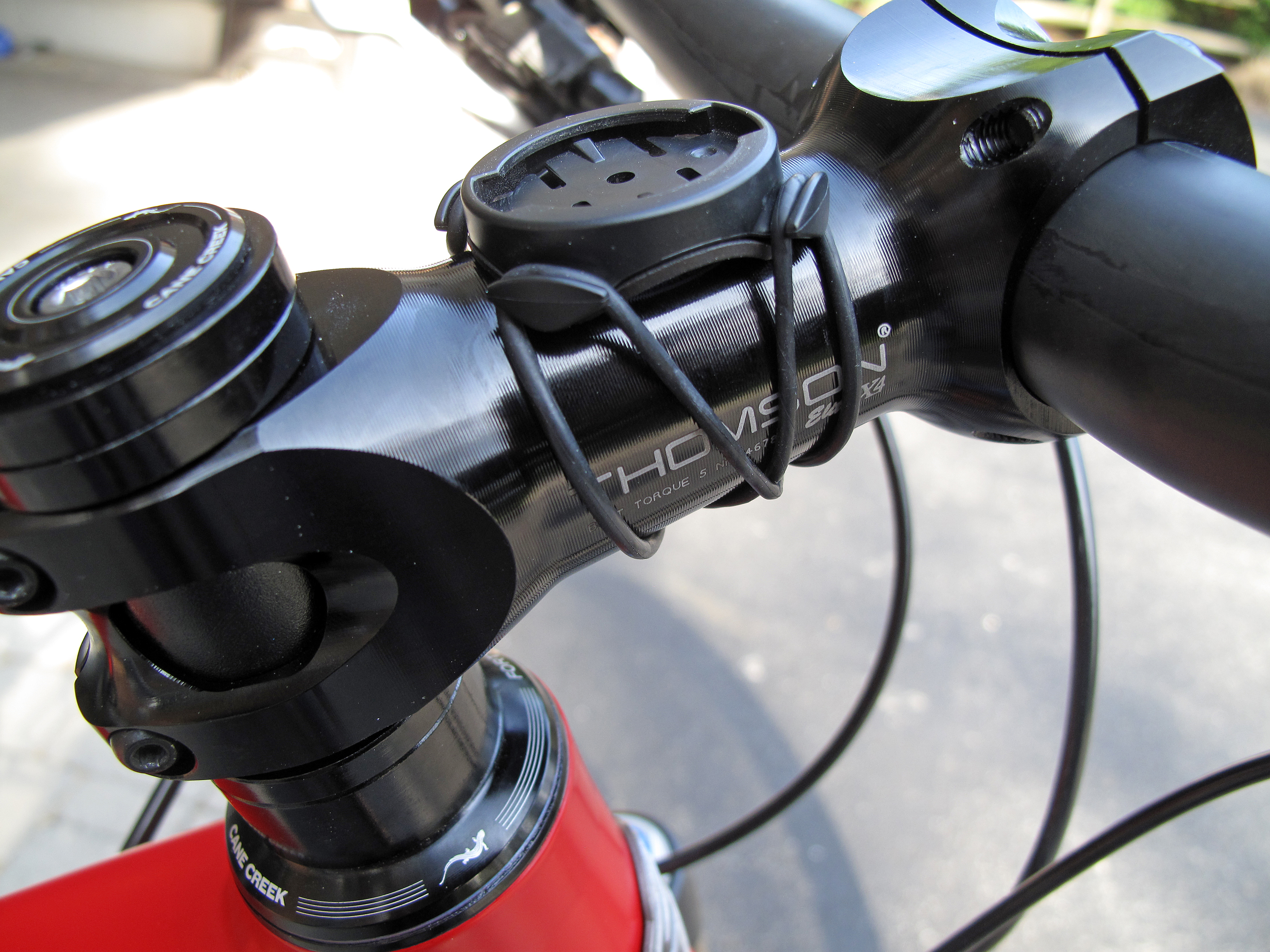
Thomson stem on a 2013 Santa Cruz Tallboy

L.H. Thomson is an American manufacturer of aerospace components and bicycle parts. It has a 60,000 square feet (5,600 m^{2}) machine shop in Macon, Georgia.

== History ==
The company was founded by Loronzo Harold Thomson (Ronnie) and his wife Margaret in 1968, as a small machine shop called NEMCO (Numerical Engineering Machine Company) just outside Macon. In 1980, it was one of a number of companies to be acquired by Boeing, resulting in Ronnie becoming the President of Boeing Georgia. In 1981, they purchased the NEMCO building back from Boeing and founded L.H. Thomson, focusing on modern computerized CNC machining instead of the more common method at the time, manual machining. In 1992, the company moved into a new facility almost four times as large as the previous building, and between 1994 and 1996 started producing bicycle parts as well. When Ronnie died in 2008, Marge Thomson took over as CEO with her son, Brian Thomson, as president.

== Products ==
=== Bicycle ===
In 1994, Carnegie Mellon graduates Chris McGee and Mark McJunkin joined LH Thomson to launch the Bicycle Division of the company. After a year of testing and development, the Thomson Elite Seatpost was introduced at the 1995 Interbike Show in Las Vegas. The response was extraordinary, and within a year the Elite had become the standard for durability, value, and performance. LH Thomson holds multiple mechanical and design patents for cycling products, and is viewed as an industry leader in the production of high-end bicycle components. The company has traditionally made seatposts and stems, but has diversified into handlebars and dropper seatposts, as well as adding titanium and carbon fibre to the materials they use.

=== Aircraft ===
Around 70% of its business is making parts for aviation companies like Boeing, Cessna and Gulfstream.
