= FZ275 LGR =

Weapon system by Thales

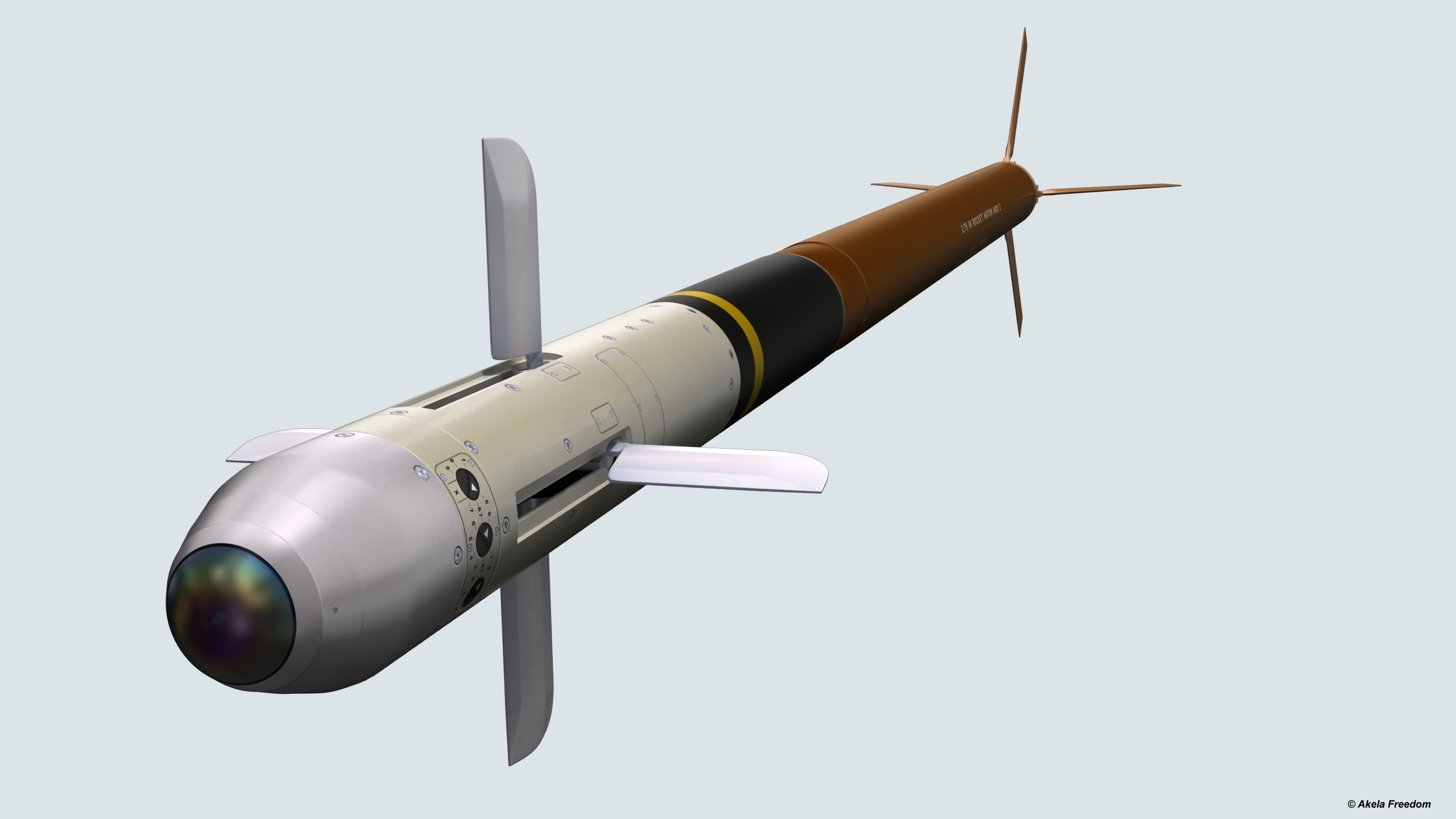
- Type: Air-to-surface, anti-armor and anti-personnel missile
- Place of origin: Belgium

Production history
- Designed: 2006–2010
- Manufacturer: Thales Belgium SA (formerly Forges de Zeebrugge); Adani Defence & Aerospace; Kalyani Strategic Systems
- Produced: 2017–present

Specifications
- Mass: 12.7 kg
- Length: 1.8 m
- Diameter: 2.75" (70 mm)
- Warhead: Composition B (high explosive fragmentation) (Penetration: 6 mm ST37-2 DIN 17100 Standard Steel)
- Warhead weight: 4.1 kg
- Detonation mechanism: Impact fuze
- Engine: FZ276 MOD.1 rocket motor
- Operational range: 1.5 - 7 km
- Guidance system: Semi-active laser
- Steering system: 4 folding canards
- Accuracy: 1 m at 6 km range CEP
- Launch platform: Attack Helicopter

The FZ275 LGR - Laser Guided Rocket is a weapon system designed by Forges de Zeebrugge (since 2017 owned by Thales Belgium). It is intended to provide a low-cost guided missile compatible with existing unguided 70mm rocket launch platforms. The HE (High Explosive) version of the FZ275 LGR is equipped with a HE warhead with impact fuze.

== Program development ==
- 2006 – Program start
- November 2010 – First successful firing
- October 2015 – Successful air-to-ground test firing onboard South-African (SAAF) Rooivalk helicopter at Denel Overberg Test Range (OTB)
- December 2017 - Test firings at the Älvdalen test range
- November 2024 - Belgian company Thales and an unnamed Ukrainian company have signed an agreement to build FZ275 LGR in Ukraine, for use against drones.
- In January 2026, Serbia shown for the first time on military exhibition. Armed H145M helicopter.

Production: 700 LGRs in 2024, 3,500 in 2025 and aim to reach 10,000 units in 2026.

== Manufacturing ==
In June 2024, Adani Defence & Aerospace signed an agreement with Thales Group to locally manufacture 70 mm calibre FZ275 LGR rockets for Indian attack helicopters like HAL Rudra and HAL Prachand.

Kalyani Strategic Systems and Thales signed a Strategic Alliance Agreement on 3 September 2026, to establish industrial capacity for the co-production of the 70 mm rockets in India. The rockets are currently manufactured in the Belgian unit of Thales and the agreement was signed during the official visit of Belgian Prime Minister to India. Thales will offer its experience in 70-mm rockets and launchers built in Belgium, while KSSL will use its local manufacturing and testing capabilities to support the fabrication and integration of components from Thales' qualified supply chain. The upcoming Energetics facility of KSSL in Andhra Pradesh will also be part of the project. The first rocket fully assembled in India is expected to be delivered by early 2027. Along with the FZ275 laser-guided rockets, the agreement also covers the FZ90 unguided Folding Fin Aircraft Rocket (FFAR). The status of two separate agreements through memorandum of understanding with Bharat Dynamics Limited in 2023 and in 2024 Adani Defence & Aerospace for a similar co-production project remained unclarified, as reported by Janes.

== Platforms ==
- Denel Rooivalk
- Eurocopter EC145
- HAL Prachand
- HAL Rudra
- VAMPIRE
- Aero L-39 Skyfox Drone Hunter (introduced in 2026 for counter unmanned ariel systems roles)

== Specifications ==
- Diameter: 70 mm (2.75 in)
- Guidance: SAL - Semi-Active Laser.
- Laser: compatible with STANAG 3733 or used defined code
- Length: 1.8 m
- Motor: FZ276 MOD.1 rocket motor
- Range from Sea Level: Min: 1.5 km Max: 8 km
- Steering type: 4 folding canards
- Warhead: FZ319 HE warhead with MK352 impact fuze
- Weight: 12.5 kg /9.1 kg (after burn)

== See also ==
- Direct Attack Guided Rocket – (United States)
- Low-Cost Guided Imaging Rocket – (South Korea)
- Advanced Precision Kill Weapon System – (United States)
- Roketsan Cirit – (Turkey)
- Guided Advanced Tactical Rocket – (United States, Israel)
