= TL =

TL or Tl may refer to:

== Arts and entertainment ==
- Teens' love, Japanese erotic fiction marketed towards women
- Télé Liban, a Lebanese television network
- Turn Left (newspaper), Cornell University student publication

== Language ==
- Tl (digraph), a digraph representing a voiceless alveolar lateral affricate in some languages
- Tagalog language (ISO 639 alpha-2 code: tl)

== Organisations ==
- Airnorth (IATA airline code TL), an airline
- Public transport in the Lausanne Region, a transport company
- Teknisk Landsforbund, the Danish Union of Professional Technicians
- Team Liquid, a professional gaming and eSports team and community website

== Science and technology ==
- Liquidus temperature, the maximum temperature at which crystals can co-exist with the melt
- Teralitre (Tl or TL), a metric unit of volume or capacity
- Thallium, symbol Tl, a chemical element
- Thermoluminescence dating, in geochronology
- Total length in fish measurement
- Transmission loss (TL), in acoustics, electronics, optics, and related fields

=== Computing ===
- .tl, East Timor's Internet country code top-level domain
- Transform, clipping, and lighting (T&L), in computer graphics

=== Vehicles ===
- Acura TL, a mid-size luxury car
- TL11, engine for Leyland Tiger
- Volkswagen TL, a compact car produced in the 1960s and 1970s

=== Weapons ===
- TL (missile), series of Chinese air-to-surface missiles
- TL series of Chinese airborne munitions dispensers

== Other uses ==
- "The TL", nickname for Tenderloin, San Francisco
- East Timor (ISO 3166-1 alpha-2 country code)
- Turkish lira (TL), a currency
- Thameslink, a train operator in the UK
- Tahiti Ligue 1
- Tahiti Ligue 2

== See also ==
- TL6 (disambiguation)
