= TL (missile) =

Chinese air-to-ground missile

The Tianlei (TL; Chinese: 天雷; lit. 'Sky Thunder') is a series of Chinese air-to-ground missile developed by China Aerospace Science and Technology Corporation (CASC). Designed to be fire-and-forget with man-in-the-loop capability, it can be carried by unmanned aerial vehicles (UAVs), helicopters, and fixed-wing aircraft. It can provide precision attacks on fixed and slow-moving targets.

== TL-1 ==
Developed by the China Aerospace Science and Technology Corporation (CASC) 4th Academy, the Tianlei-1 is a compact air-to-surface guided missile designed for integrated reconnaissance and strike. It can be mounted on drones and helicopters, targeting fixed or slow-moving targets such as tanks, light armored vehicles, radars, field command structures, and small naval vessels.

== TL-2 ==
TL-2 is a lightweight missile or guided rocket, tailored to be carried by unmanned aerial vehicles (UAV) and helicopters. It features laser guidance, lightweight construction, compact dimensions, and is capable of targeting armored vehicles, fortifications, and personnel targets. Although the TL-2 has an airframe similar to that of 90 mm (3.5 in) guided rockets, such as the Chinese Tianjian or American Direct Attack Guided Rocket (DAGR), it has a much larger off-boresight launch angle and maneuverability than regular guided rockets because drone-launching requirements dictate its design. It can be equipped with small reconnaissance drones, such as the Aisheng ASN-206 and Aisheng ASN-209. For an artillery reconnaissance drone like the ASN-206, the TL-2 allows increased operational flexibility where the drone could engage critical targets during the reconnaissance or conduct follow-up strikes during the battle damage assessment.

== TL-3 ==
TL-3 is a medium to long-range air-to-ground missile capable of standoff strikes against heavy or large-sized military targets, such as command centers, bridges, missile launch sites, radar stations, airports, and troop assemblies.

== TL-4 ==
TL-4 is a compact, TV-guided missile suitable for being carried by infantry or light vehicles, mounted on tripods or all-terrain vehicles. It has a range of 6 km (3.7 mi) and a multi-mode engagement system that enables both fire and forget with man-in-the-loop (HITL) operation mode, or lock on before launch (LOBL)/lock on after launch (LOAL) operation mode.

== Specifications ==
Missile specifications
	TL-1	TL-2	TL-3	TL-4
Launch mass	88 kg (194 lb)	16 kg (35 lb)	620 kg (1,370 lb)	26 kg (57 lb)
Warhead	14 kg (31 lb)	3.8 kg (8.4 lb)	160 kg (350 lb)	
Length	1,960 mm (6.43 ft)	1,455 mm (4.774 ft)	4,153 mm (13.625 ft)	1,200 mm (3.9 ft)
Diameter	175 mm (6.9 in)	88 mm (3.5 in)	350 mm (14 in)	140 mm (5.5 in)
Range	3–20 km (1.9–12.4 mi; 1.6–10.8 nmi)	1.5–8 km (0.93–4.97 mi; 0.81–4.32 nmi)	230 km (140 mi; 120 nmi)	0.5–6 km (0.31–3.73 mi; 0.27–3.24 nmi)
Maximum speed	Mach 0.8	Mach 0.9	≥Mach 1.2	
Release altitude			500–5,000 m (1,600–16,400 ft)	
Release speed			180–250 km/h (97–135 kn)	
Warhead	Penetration / Fragment warhead	Fragment warhead	kinetic penetration / Blast / Anti-radiation	
Guidance	INS + GNSS + Datalink + infrared homing	INS + SAL	INS + GNSS + infrared homing / Passive radar	Datalink + infrared homing / Television (TV)
Accuracy (CEP)	≤1m	≤1m	≤10m	

== See also ==
- AR-1 (missile)
- Fire snake (rocket)
- HJ-12
