= Hydra 70 =

American 2.75-inch rocket

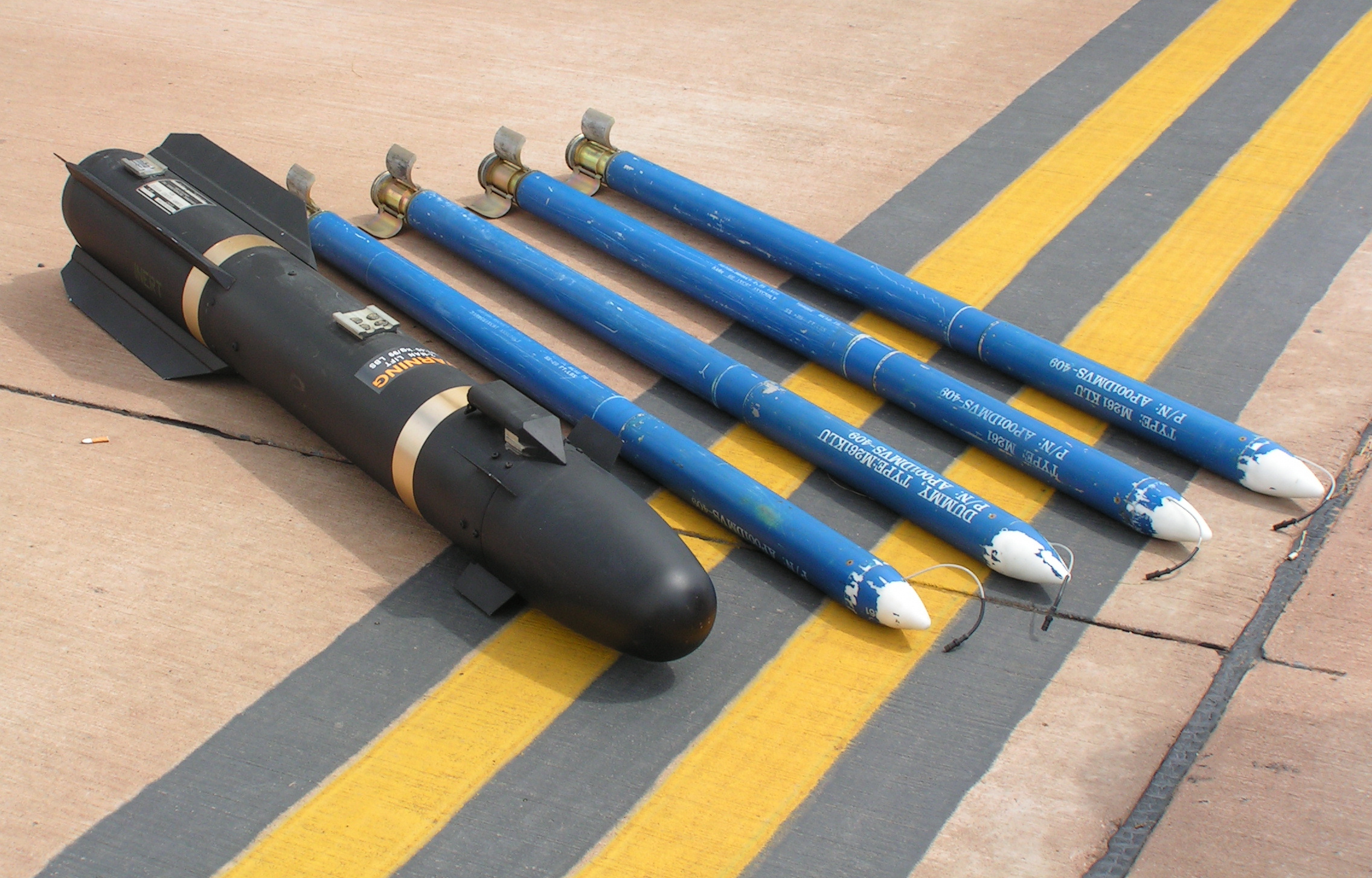
- Four dummy (inert) Hydra 70 rockets next to an AGM-114 Hellfire
- Type: Rocket
- Place of origin: United States

Service history
- Used by: See Users

Production history
- Unit cost: $2,799

Specifications
- Mass: 13.6 lb (6.2 kg) (Mk 66 Mod 4 rocket motor only) about 25 lb for the rocket depending on the warhead
- Length: 41.7 in (1,060 mm)
- Diameter: 2.75 in (70 mm)
- Muzzle velocity: 2,300 feet per second (700 m/s)
- Effective firing range: 8,700 yards (8,000 m)
- Maximum firing range: 11,500 yards (10,500 m)
- Maximum speed: 2,425 ft/s (739 m/s)
- Guidance system: unguided
- Launch platform: OH-58 Kiowa, UH-60 Black Hawk, MH-6 Little Bird, UH-1 Iroquois; UH-1N Twin Huey; UH-1Y Venom; AH-1 Cobra, AH-1W SuperCobra, AH-1Z Viper, AH-64 Apache, Eurocopter Tiger, T-129 ATAK, OV-10 Bronco, A-10 Thunderbolt II, AV-8B Harrier II, F-16 Fighting Falcon, F/A-18 Hornet, P-3 Orion, Mi-24

The Hydra 70 rocket is an American made 2.75-inch (70 mm) diameter fin-stabilized unguided rocket used primarily in the air-to-ground role. It can be equipped with a variety of warheads, and in more recent versions, guidance systems for point attacks. The Hydra is widely used by US and allied forces, competing with the Canadian CRV7, with which it is physically interchangeable.

== Overview ==
The Hydra 70 is derived from the 2.75-inch (70 mm) diameter Mk 4/Mk 40 Folding-Fin Aerial Rocket developed by the United States Navy for use as a free-flight aerial rocket in the late 1940s. The Mk 40 was used during the Korean and Vietnam wars to provide close air support to ground forces from about 20 different firing platforms, both fixed-wing and armed helicopters.

The main change made to produce the Hydra was the Mk. 66 motor which uses a new propellant that offers considerably more thrust, 1,335 pounds-force (5,940 N) (Mod 2/3) 1,415 pounds-force (6,290 N) (Mod 4). The fins of the Mk 40 flipped forward from the rear when the rocket left the launching tube, but in the Hydra they are curved to match the outside diameter of the rocket fuselage and flip sideways to open, which is referred to as WAFAR (Wrap-Around Fin Aerial Rocket) instead of FFAR (folding-fin aerial rocket). To improve stability during the time the fins are still opening, the four motor nozzles have a slight cant angle to impart a spin while the rocket is still in the launch tube.

Today, the OH-58D(R) Kiowa Warrior, the Black Hawk, and AH-64E Apache Longbow, as well as the Marine Corps' versatile UH-1 Huey and AH-1 Cobra, carry the Hydra rocket launcher standard on its weapon pylons.

=== Mk 66 rocket motor variants ===
Designation	Description
Mk 66 Mod 0	70 mm (2.75 in) WAFAR universal motor; common motor for the GD Hydra 70 series of rockets; original prototype; for US Army. Introduced in 1972.
Mk 66 Mod 1	Mk 66 variant; production variant; for US Army
Mk 66 Mod 2	Mk 66 Mod 1 variant; HERO (Hazards of Electromagnetic Radiation to Ordnance) safe; for US Navy and US Air Force. Began production in 1986.
Mk 66 Mod 3	Mk 66 Mod 1 variant; HERO safe; Mk 66 Mod 2 for US Army
Mk 66 Mod 4	Mk 66 Mod 2/3 variant; incorporates a Salt rod to reduce exhaust gases; for all services. Began production in 1999.
Mk 66 Mod 5	Mk 66 Mod 4 variant; Incorporates propellant venting during fast cook off
Mk 66 Mod 6	Mk 66 Mod 4/5 variant; designed to reduce the tendency of secondary launch gases to combust in the parent aircraft’s engine, primarily with the AH-64 helicopter

== Service ==
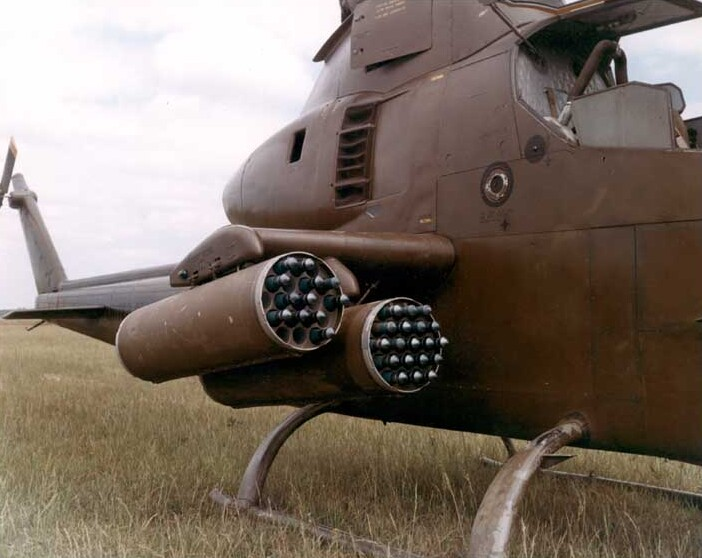
Hydra 70 rockets on an AH-1 Cobra helicopter

The family of Hydra 70 (70 mm) 2.75 inch rockets perform a variety of functions. The war reserve unitary and cargo warheads are used for anti-materiel, anti-personnel, and suppression missions. The Hydra 70 family of folding-fin aerial rockets also includes smoke screening, illumination, and training warheads. Hydra 70 rockets are known mainly by either their warhead type or by the rocket motor designation, Mk 66 in US military service.

=== United States ===
In the U.S. Army, Hydra 70 rockets are fired from the AH-64 Apache and AH-64D Apache Longbow helicopter variants using M261 19-tube rocket launchers, and the OH-58D Kiowa Warrior using seven-tube M260 rocket launchers. In the U.S. Marine Corps, either the M260 or M261 launchers are employed on the AH-1W SuperCobra and AH-1Z Viper, depending upon the mission. The M260 and M261 are used with the Mk 66 series of rocket motor, which replaced the Mk 40 series. The Mk 66 has a reduced system weight and provides a remote fuze setting interface. Hydra 70s have also been fired from UH-60 and AH-6 series aircraft in US Army service.

The AH-1G Cobra and the UH-1B "Huey" used a variety of launchers including the M158 seven-tube and M200 19-tube rocket launchers designed for the Mk 40 rocket motor; however, these models have been replaced by upgraded variants in the U.S. Marine Corps because they were not compatible with the Mk 66 rocket motor. The Hydra 70 rocket system is also used by the U.S. Navy and the U.S. Air Force.

=== Common U.S. Mk 66 compatible launchers ===
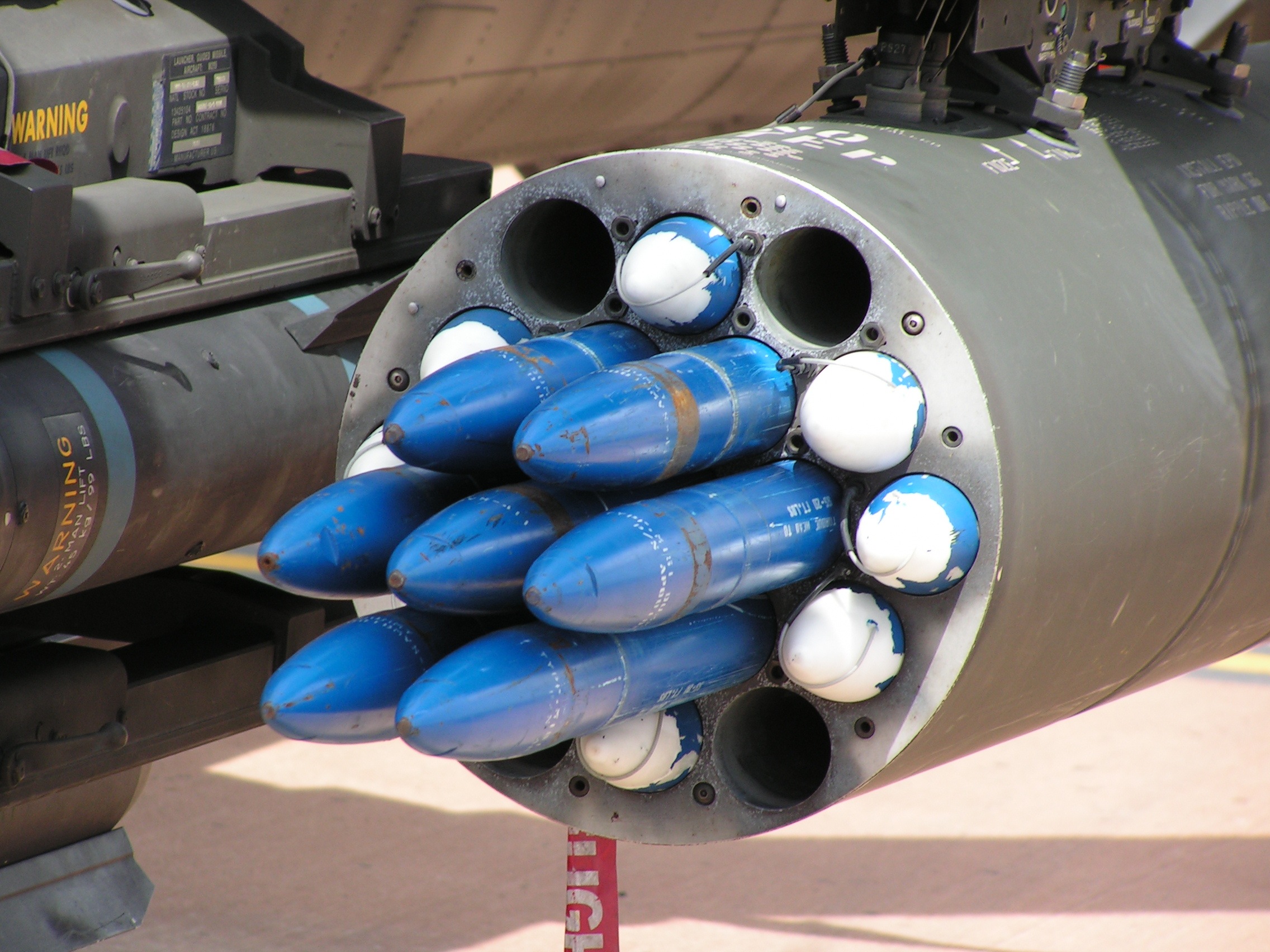
Dummy Hydra 70s in an M261 launcher on a Dutch AH-64 Apache. The tips of some of the rockets are white (and the rockets are shorter in length, and they are attached to the launcher via umbilical connectors) because they have a different type of warhead and fuze.

Designation	Description
M260	7-Tube LWL (LightWeight Launcher, 35 lb, 15.9 kg)
M261	19-Tube LWL (LightWeight Launcher, 80 lb, 36.3 kg)
LAU-130/A	19-Tube rocket launcher
LAU-131/A	7-Tube rocket launcher
LAU-68D/A	7-Tube LAU-68C/A variant; compatible w/ Mk 66 rocket motor; external thermal protection coating; launcher supports single and ripple firing
LAU-69D/A	19-Tube LAU-61B/A variant; compatible w/ Mk 66 rocket motor; external thermal protection coating; launcher supports single and ripple firing

=== Accidents ===
In 2019, a 72-year-old Taiwanese man was killed after a discarded Hydra rocket which he had cut into with an electric saw exploded. He had believed it to be a length of pipe. The rocket had been caught in the net of a fishing vessel and then discarded by the crew ashore as scrap metal.

== Warheads ==
Hydra 70 warheads fall into three categories:

- Unitary warheads with impact-detonating fuzes or remote-set multi-option fuzes.
- Cargo warheads with air burst-range, with settable fuzes using the "wall-in-space" concept or fixed standoff fuzes.
- Training warheads.

=== Fuzing options ===
#	Designation	Description	Arming Range, Acceleration or Time
1	M423	Nose Mount, Point Detonating for slow speed platforms (helicopters)	47 to 102 yards (43 to 93 m)
2	M427	Nose Mount, Point Detonating for high speed platforms	197 to 466 yards (180 to 426 m)
3	XM436	Air burst, Motor-Burnout Delay	
4	XM438/M438	Nose Mount, Point Detonating	
5	M440	Point Detonating	
6	Mk 352 Mod 0/1/2	Point Detonating	
7	M429	Proximity Air burst	
8	M433	Nose Mount, Resistance Capacitance (RC)	SuperQuick (PD) 11 to 49 yards (10 to 45 m) Delay in 5.5 yards (5.0 m) increments including 3.3 yards (3.0 m) Bunker penetrating option
9	M439	Base Mount, Resistance Capacitance (RC), Payload Discharging Pilot-Selectable	Discharges submunitions between 547 and 7,874 yards (500 and 7,200 m) (766 to 7,546 yards [700 to 6,900 m] on AH-1s) 27Gs
10	M442	Air burst, Motor-Burnout Delay	Discharges Flare at 3,281 yards (3,000 m), 17-22 g required for arming
11	M446	Base Mount, Air burst, Motor-Burnout Delay	
12	Model 113A	Base Mount, Air burst, Motor-Burnout Delay	

=== Common warheads ===
The most common warhead for the Hydra 70 rocket is the M151 "10-Pounder," which has a blast radius of 10 meters and lethal fragmentation radius of around 50 meters. The M247 HEDP warheads have similar penetration to the standard M72 LAW warhead (~300 mm of rolled homogenous armor).

Designation	Description	Weight	Payload	Fuze Type	Fuzing options
M151	High explosive (HEDP) '10 pounder'	8.7 lb (3.9 kg) (w/o Fuze)	2.3 lb (1.0 kg) Comp B-4 HE	M423	1,2,5,7,8
M156	White phosphorus munitions (WP)	9.65 lb (4.38 kg)	2.2 lb (1.00 kg) WP	M423 M429	1,2,6,7
M229	High explosive (HEDP); elongated M151 '17 pounder'	17.0 lb (7.7 kg) (Fuzed)	4.8 lb (2.2 kg) Comp B-4 HE	M423	1,2,6,7
M247	High-explosive anti-tank (HEAT)/high-explosive dual purpose (HEDP)	8.8 lb (4.0 kg)	2.0 lb (0.91 kg) Comp B HE	M438 PD	4 (integral to warhead)
M255	APERS (anti-personnel) warhead		2500 28 grains (1.8 g) flechettes		9
M255E1/A1	Flechette warhead	14.0 lb (6.4 kg)	1179 60 grains (3.9 g) flechettes	M439	9
M257	Parachute illumination	11.0 lb (5.0 kg)	One M257 Candle (Flare) 1 million candela	M442	10 (integral to warhead)
M259	White phosphorus (WP)				9
M261	Multi-purpose submunition (MPSM)	13.5 lb (6.1 kg)	9 M73 (Grenade) Submunitions	M439 with M84 electric detonator	9
M264	Red phosphorus (RP) Smoke	8.6 lb (3.9 kg)	72 RP Pellets	M439	9
M267	MPSM Practice	13.5 lb (6.1 kg)	Three Marking SMs, 6 Metal Weights	M439 with M84 electric detonator	9
M274	Practice (Smoke)	9.3 lb (4.2 kg)	2 ounces (57 g) of potassium perchlorate and aluminum powder	M423	1
M278	Infra-red (IR) parachute illumination	11.0 lb (5.0 kg)	One M278 IR Flare	M442	10 (integral to warhead)
M282	Multipurpose penetrator warhead	13.7 lb (6.2 kg)	0.98 lb (0.44 kg) PBXN-110	delayed	
Mk 67 Mod 0	White phosphorus (WP)				1,2,6,7
Mk 67 Mod 1	Red phosphorus (RP)				1,2,6,7
WTU-1/B	Practice	9.3 lb (4.2 kg)	Inert	None	None
WDU-4/A	APERS warhead	9.3 lb (4.2 kg)	96 flechettes of unknown weight		12 (integral to warhead)
WDU-4A/A	APERS warhead	9.3 lb (4.2 kg)	2205 20 grains (1.3 g) flechettes	M405A2	12 (integral to warhead)

== Mk 66 rocket motor technical data ==
- Weight: 13.6 pounds (6.2 kg)
- Length: 41.7 inches (1,060 mm)
- Burn time: 1.07 sec
- Average thrust (77 °F (25 °C)):
  - 1,335 lbf (5.94 kN) (Mod 2/3)
  - 1,415 lbf (6.29 kN) (Mod 4)
- Motor burnout range: 1,300 feet (400 m)
- Motor burnout velocity: 2,425 ft/s (739 m/s)
- Launch spin rate: 10 rps, 35 rps after exiting launcher
- Velocity at launcher exit: 148 ft/s (45 m/s)
- Acceleration:
  - 60–70 g (initial)
  - 95–100 g (final)
- Effective Range: 547 to 8,749 yards (500 to 8,000 m) depending on warhead and launch platform
- Maximum Range: 11,483 yards (10,500 m) under optimum conditions

== Precision guided Hydra 70 ==
There are several design efforts to turn the Hydra 70 rocket into a precision guided munition (PGM) to produce a weapon with greater accuracy but at less cost than other guided missiles. These include:

- The BAE Systems Advanced Precision Kill Weapon System (APKWS) II
- U.S. Navy Low-Cost Guided Imaging Rocket (LOGIR)
- Lockheed Martin Direct Attack Guided Rocket (DAGR)
- The ATK/Elbit Guided Advanced Tactical Rocket – Laser (GATR-L)
- Raytheon TALON
- Forges de Zeebrugge SAL-Laser Guided Rocket (FZ275 LGR)

The APKWS was the first to be fielded in March 2012, and the TALON entered full rate production for the United Arab Emirates Armed Forces in September 2014.

The Turkish ROKETSAN Cirit is a similar missile compatible with 70 mm rocket launchers, but it was developed from scratch and does not use Hydra 70 components.

== Operators ==
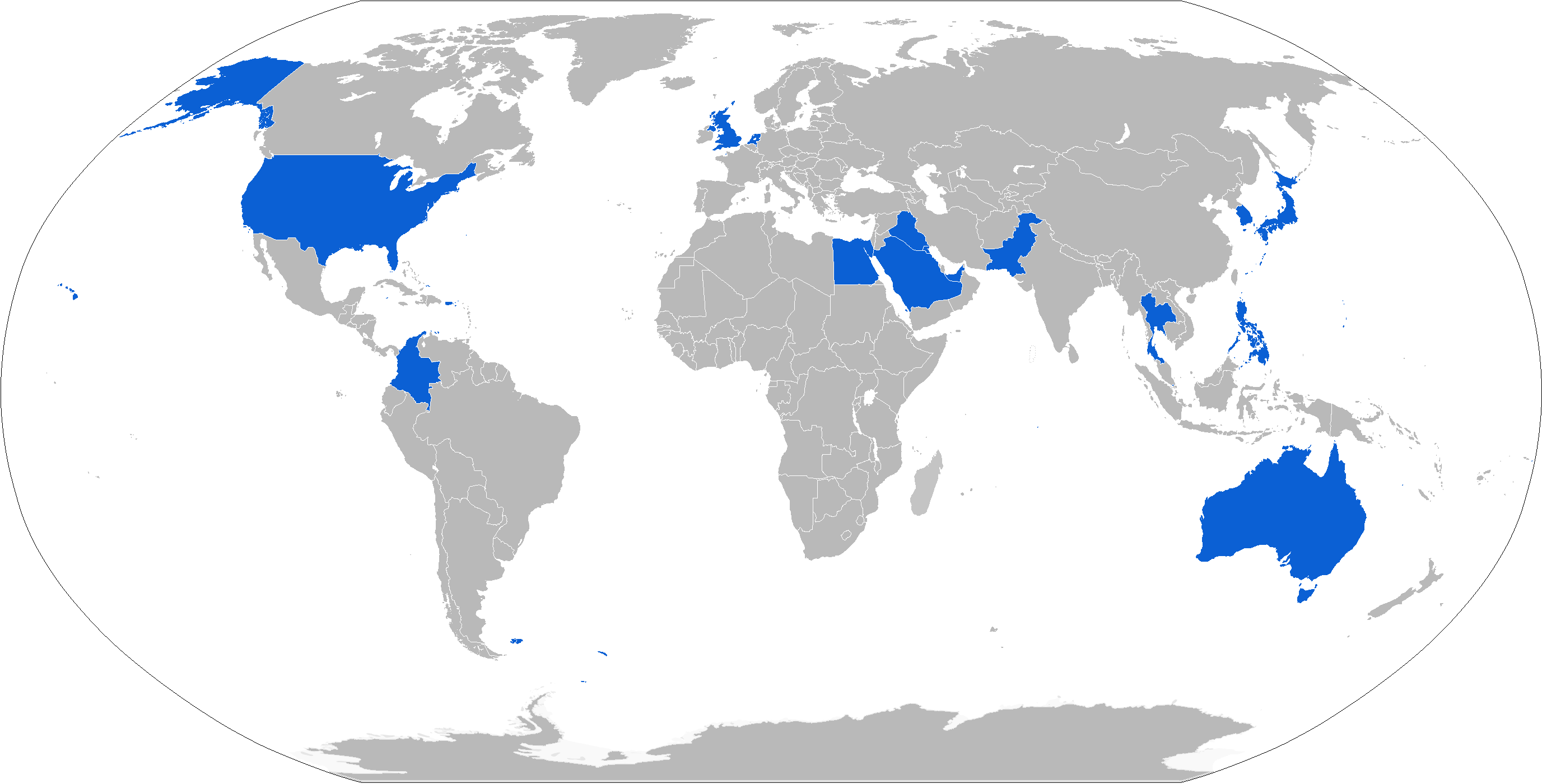
Map with Hydra 70 operators in blue

- Australia − APKWS
- Colombia
- Croatia − Used on Bell OH-58D Kiowa helicopters
- Egypt
- India − APKWS
- Indonesia
- Iraq − APKWS
- Japan
- Jordan − APKWS
- Kuwait
- Lebanon − APKWS
- Netherlands − APKWS
- Nigeria − APKWS
- Pakistan
- Philippines − APKWS
- Qatar − APKWS
- Saudi Arabia
- Singapore
- Taiwan
- Thailand
- Tunisia − APKWS
- Ukraine − Used on Mi-24 gunships
- United Arab Emirates
- United Kingdom
- United States

== See also ==
=== Comparable weapon systems ===
- S-8 (80 mm) – (Soviet Union)
- Zuni 5in (127 mm) – (United States)
- SNEB 68 (68 mm) – (France)
- CRV-7 (70 mm) – (Canada)
- Roketsan Cirit (70 mm) – (Turkey)

=== Other ===
- Launch platform NCSIST 2.75in rockets remote weapon station – (Taiwan)
- U.S. Army Aviation and Missile Command

== Bibliography ==
- International Institute for Strategic Studies (15 February 2023). The Military Balance 2023 (1st ed.). Routledge. ISBN 978-1032508955.
