= CRV7 =

Canadian 2.75-inch rocket

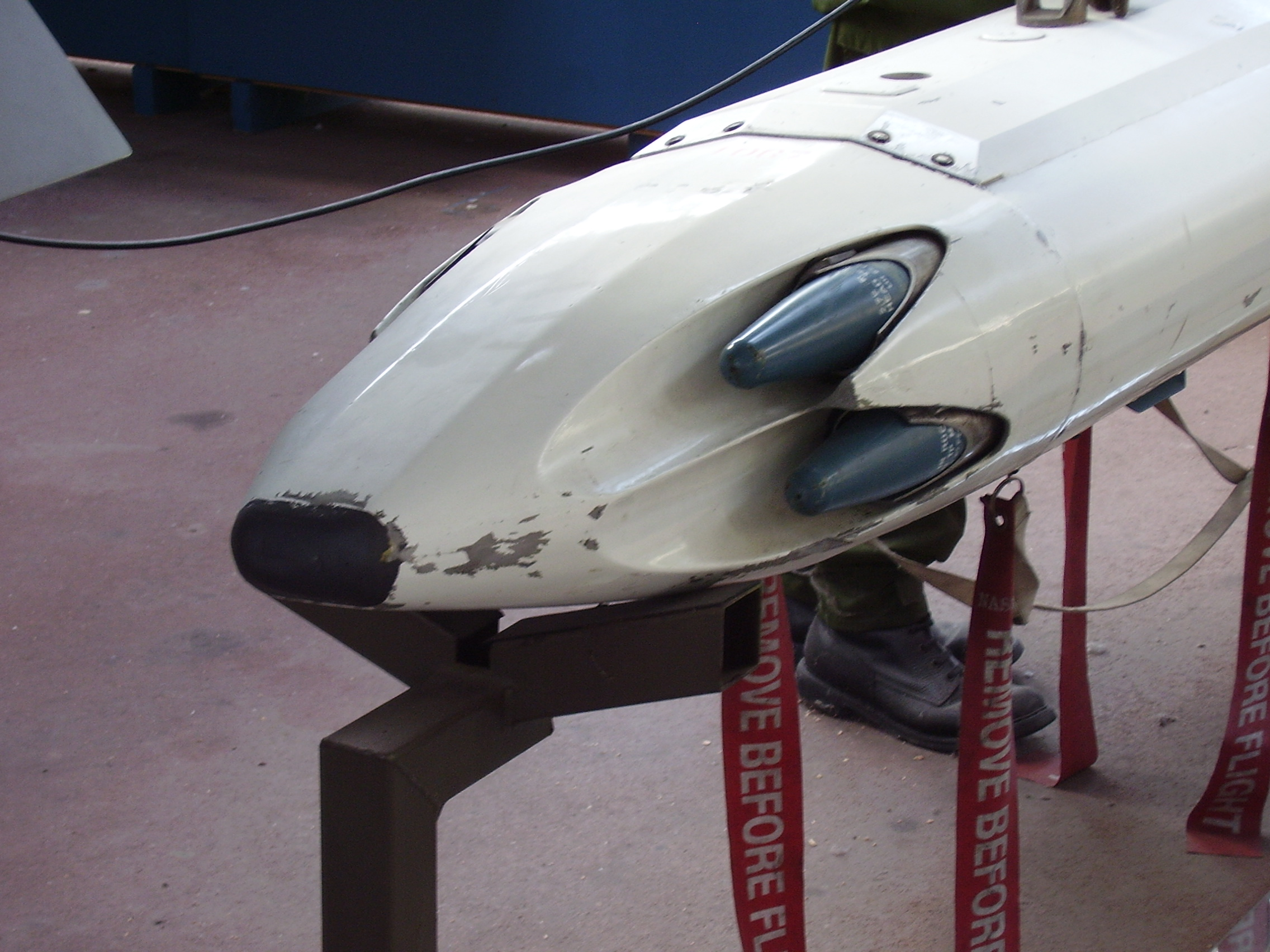
A SUU-5003 bomblet dispenser adapted to fire four CRV7 rockets. Two rocket tubes are visible, while shackles for six practice bombs are located underneath. Given both stores, pilots can train rocket and bomb fire on a single sortie.

The CRV7, short for "Canadian Rocket Vehicle 7", is a 2.75-inch (70 mm) folding-fin ground attack rocket produced by Bristol Aerospace in Winnipeg, Manitoba. The CRV7 remains one of the most powerful air-to-ground attack rockets to this day, and has slowly become the de facto standard for Western-aligned forces outside the United States.

== History ==
The CRV7 was introduced in the early 1970s as an upgraded version of the standard U.S. 2.75-inch air-to-ground rocket. It was the most powerful weapon of its class, the first with enough energy to penetrate standard Warsaw Pact aircraft hangars.

Beginning in 2021, 83,303 stored Canadian CRV7s are slated for disposal, having been removed from service from 2005 to 2007.

In 2024 the Department of National Defence was considering donating the rockets to Ukraine as military aid to defend against the Russian invasion of Ukraine. An estimated 8,000 rockets have functioning warheads, while the remainder could be used for parts or modification.

In September 2024 Canadian defence minister Bill Blair announced Canada would be sending 80,840 rocket motors to Ukraine over the next months, in addition to the 2,100 already shipped, along with 1,300 warheads.

== Development ==
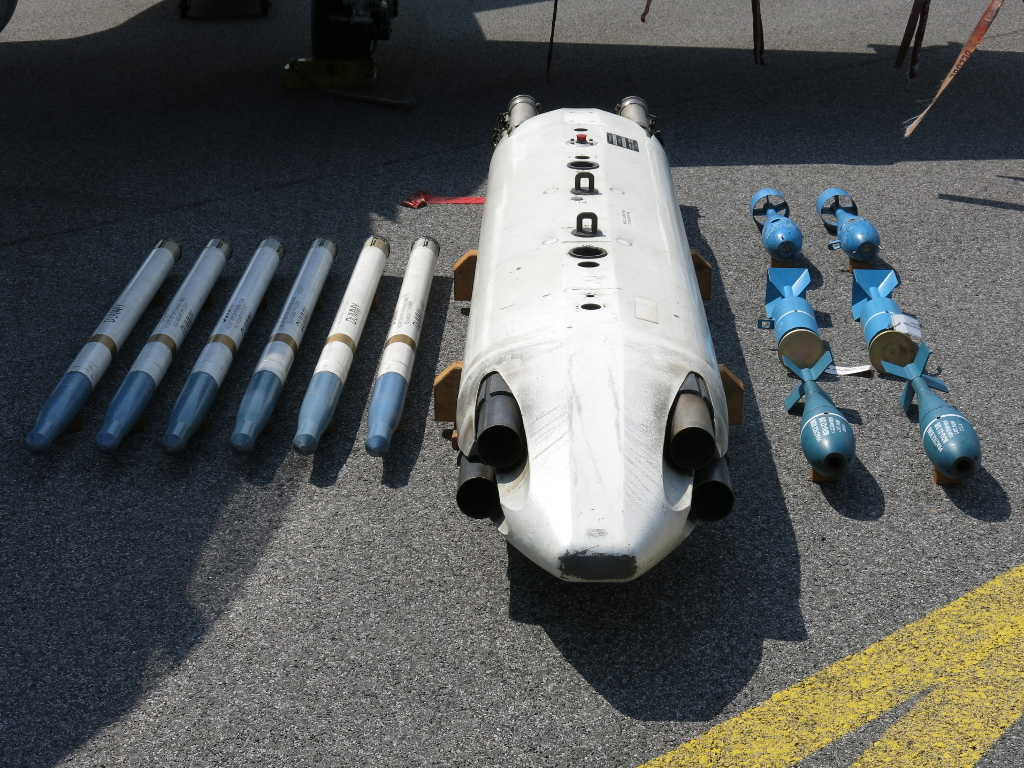
SUU-5003 bomblet dispenser for training purposes with six CRV7 rockets and six BDU-33 bombs

The CRV7 was an offshoot of late 1950s research at CARDE (now DRDC Valcartier) into high-performance solid fuel rockets, research performed as a part of a general program studying anti-ballistic missiles. With Aerojet's assistance, CARDE and Bristol developed the "Propulsion Test Vehicle" to test new fuel and engine designs. This program led to the development of the Black Brant sounding rocket, which first flew in 1960 and has had a long and successful career since then. Engineer Jose Tharayil from Bristol Aerospace is considered the driving force behind the CRV7's development and production.

In the early 1970s, CARDE and Bristol decided to use the same propellant and engine design for a new 2.75-inch rocket to equip the Canadair CF-104 Starfighter. The resulting RLU-5001/B (C-14) engine was first delivered by Bristol in production form in 1973. It had a total impulse of 2,320 lbf·s (10.3 kN·s) and a burn time of 2.2 seconds. The empty weight of the rocket is 6.6 kg, and it is normally equipped with a 10 lb (4.5 kg) high-explosive warhead taken from U.S. rockets.

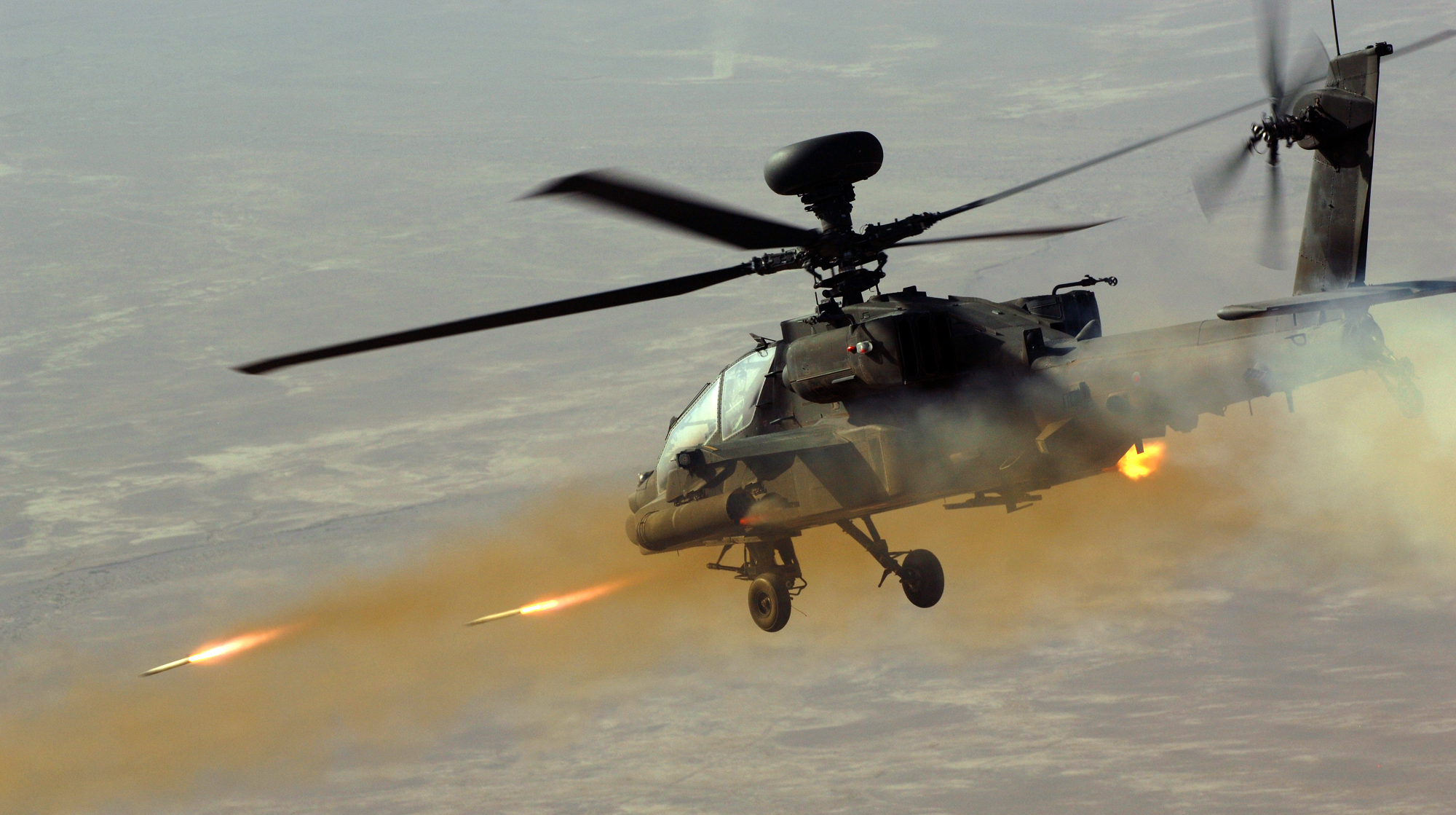
A British Army AugustaWestland Apache AH.1 attack helicopter of the Army Air Corps in Afghanistan fires rockets at insurgents during a patrol in 2008.

Compared to the U.S. Mk 40 FFAR Mighty Mouse rockets the CRV7 replaced, the higher energy fuel and newer fuselage design led to a longer and much flatter trajectory, with twice the energy on impact. Its maximum effective range is over 4,000 m, allowing launch from beyond the envelope of most short-range anti-aircraft weapons. In comparison, the Mighty Mouse or Hydra 70 requires launches from much shorter ranges, potentially placing the launch aircraft within the range of ground-based weapons arranged around the target.

Unguided rockets are normally spin stabilized like rifle bullets. The spin is imparted by small fins at the rear of the rocket body that flip out into the airstream once the rocket leaves its launch tube. The fins take a short time to open and more time to start the rocket spinning. During this period, the rockets can drift significantly from their original aim point. The CRV7 solved this problem by adding small vanes projecting into the rocket exhaust to start the rocket spinning even before it left the launch tube, greatly increasing accuracy. A salvo of CRV7's will impact the target area in one-third the footprint of older designs.

The weapon was originally quoted to have a dispersion of 4 milliradians, but testing with the McDonnell Douglas CF-18 Hornet demonstrated it was even lower, at 3 milliradians. This is considerably better than the autocannon that arm most aircraft; the widely used 20mm M61 Vulcan is rated at 8 milliradians, while the much larger and considerably heavier 30mm GAU-8 Avenger is rated at 5 milliradians.

The CRV7 had just been introduced into Royal Canadian Air Force service when it was entered as a part of a general competition in France. One part of the competition required the contestants to hit a tower with unarmed rockets. The Canadian pilot hit it on his first try, but aimed as if firing the much lower-powered Mk 40 and was therefore close enough that the rocket motor was still firing. The remaining unburned propellant shattered, allowing more surface area of the rocket motor to burn, in turn increasing the pressure and rate of combustion until it became a deflagration that destroyed the tower. The pilot was disqualified because the judges refused to believe it was unarmed.

== Engine development ==
The aluminium-based fuel in the C-14 engine generated considerable amounts of smoke. While suitable for high-speed aircraft that quickly clear the plume, it is not suitable for slower aircraft and helicopters which would be flying in the smoke for some period of time. This problem led to the development of the RLU-5002/B (C-15) engine, which did not include aluminium and produced considerably less smoke, with a slightly lower impulse of 2,185 lbf·s (9.7 kN·s). The original C-15 used a tail-mounted igniter that was ejected by the rocket when it was fired. In some cases the igniter would hit the aircraft, causing minor damage. To address this, the RLU-5002A/B (HEPI) was introduced, with a "Head-End Permanent Igniter" that is not ejected on launch.

The latest C-17 and C-18 engines for helicopter use offer somewhat lower impulse at 1,905 lbf·s (8.5 kN·s), but with almost no smoke at all.

== Warheads ==
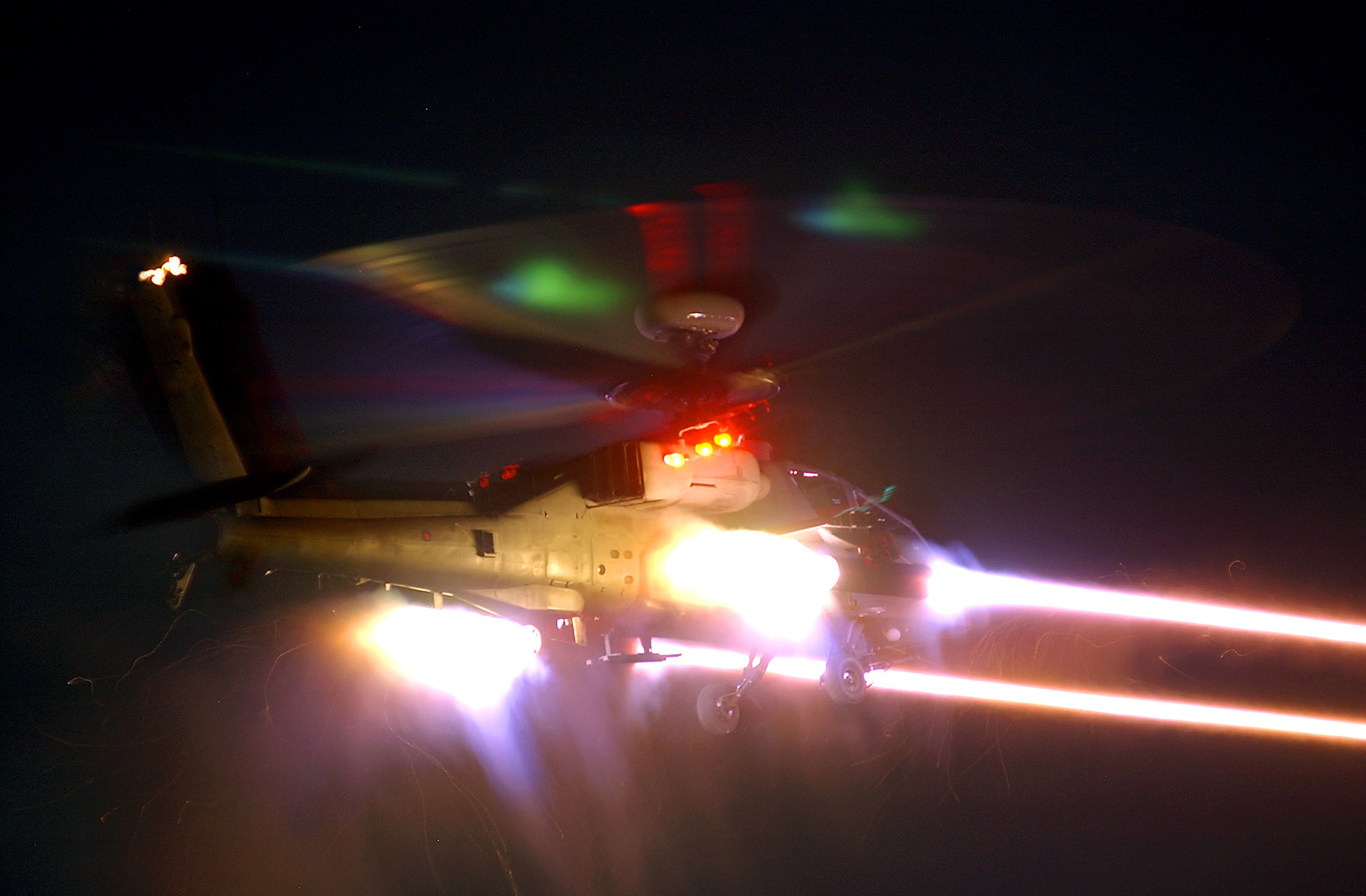
A British Army WAH-64 'Apache' attack helicopter fires a salvo of CRV7 (Practice) rockets at targets down range during a two-day live firing exercise at Lulworth Ranges/Bovington Camp in Dorset.

The primary warhead for the original CRV7 was the U.S. M151 High Explosive Point Detonating (HEPD) round, a simple impact-fired 10 lb (4.5 kg) high-explosive shell. Like the U.S. 2.75-inch (70 mm) weapons, the CRV7 could also be equipped with the M156 Smoke or M257/278 Illumination (flare) rounds. Bristol also introduced their own WTU-5001/B Practice round, consisting of an 8 lb (3.6 kg) flat-ended soft steel rod encased in a nylon fairing, and later introduced a similar version with a hardened steel rod, the WTU-5001A/B. These rounds matched the ballistics of the M151 for training purposes and were widely used during the development and introduction of the weapon to the Canadian Forces.

Bristol followed this with the 16 lb (7.3 kg) WDU-50001/B "Anti-Bunkerette" round, a semi-armor-piercing high-explosive incendiary (SAPHEI/HEISAP) warhead designed for use against reinforced concrete buildings, specifically hardened aircraft shelters. Its heavy steel shell allows the round to penetrate the hangar wall before the 75 g incendiary warhead is ignited. The round can penetrate 13 ft (4.0 m) of earth, 3 ft (91 cm) of concrete, and 1 in (25 mm) of steel, in series.

The CRV7's kinetic energy was so high that testers were surprised to find that practice rounds fitted with an 8-inch (20.3 cm) steel rod were penetrating outdated Centurion tanks used for target practice. This resulted in the development of a dedicated antitank warhead that replaced the steel rod in the practice warhead with a tungsten rod. This new antitank warhead could penetrate a Soviet T-72 main battle tank armour from any attack angle. Further study into this effect led to the WDU-5002/B FAT warhead, Flechette Anti-Tank, containing five tungsten-reinforced steel flechettes that could penetrate a T-72's side and top armour at a distance of 10,000 feet (3,000 m). It was also found to be a useful warhead for use against medium and light armoured vehicles. Further development led to the WDU-500X/B "General Purpose Flechette" which releases 80 tungsten flechettes that can penetrate 1.5 inches (38 mm) of roll-hardened armor for use against personnel, some light armour, thin-skinned vehicles, and helicopters.

Bristol also re-sells the RA-79 from Raufoss Ammunisjonsfabrikker, a semi-armor-piercing round designed to attack shipping.

The CRV7 Multi-Purpose Sub Munition (MPSM) contained nine M73 submunitions in each rocket. It could therefore be classified as a cluster bomb. Britain destroyed the last of its CRV7 MPSMs in July 2009 in accordance with its interpretation of the Convention on Cluster Munitions.

== Guided version ==
In 2006 Bristol started testing a new version of the CRV7, the CRV7-PG. The weapon was introduced at Eurosatory 2006. Bristol's current owners, Magellan Aerospace, offered it for sale starting in 2007.

The PG version, for "precision guided", adds a seeker developed by Kongsberg Defence & Aerospace to the front of any version of an otherwise unmodified CRV7. The seeker uses a simple inertial guidance system through the midcourse and homes during the terminal approach using a laser designator. Other versions offer anti-radiation seeking or GPS guidance. The precision guided kit includes the addition of tail fins and an in-flight control system. Combining the laser seeker with the FAT warhead produces a capable long-range anti-tank missile that is faster and much less expensive than traditional platforms like the AGM-114 Hellfire.

A version of the CRV7-PG was also developed for special forces use, fired from a single tube mounted on a 6 x 6 vehicle.

== Operators ==
=== Current operators ===
- Australia
- New Zealand
- Ukraine
- United States

=== Former operators ===
- Canada – Royal Canadian Air Force
- United Kingdom

== See also ==
- Mk 4/Mk 40 Folding-Fin Aerial Rocket (Mighty Mouse)
- Hydra 70
- Forges de Zeebrugge
- SNEB rocket (68 mm)
- Vought HVM
- S-8 (rocket)
