= Keep Left =

Keep Left may refer to:

- A type of traffic regulatory sign.
- Driving on the left, see Right- and left-hand traffic.
- "Keep Left" (pamphlet), a 1947 tract published in the UK.
- Keep Left, an early 1960s newspaper published by activists in the Young Socialists (UK).
- Keep Left (South Africa), a South African socialist group.
- Keep Left, a youth group within the Lebanese Democratic Left Movement.

== See also ==
- Turn Left (disambiguation)
