= Fire Snake (rocket) =

Chinese precision guided rocket

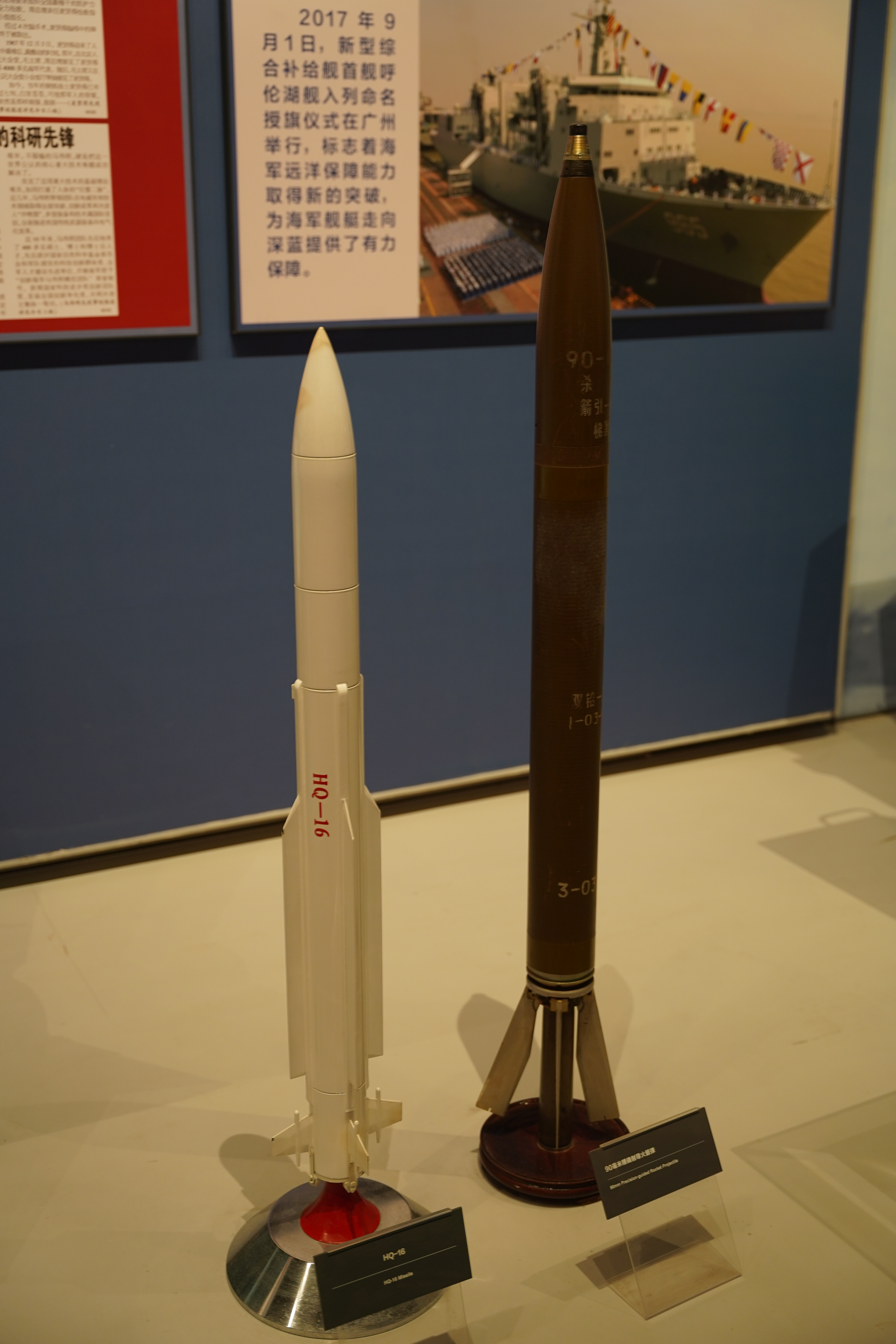
Mock up of the Chinese 90mm precision-guided rocket (right)

The Fire Snake (Chinese: 火蛇; pinyin: huǒ shé) is a series of rocket projectiles and rocket pods manufactured by the Chinese defense company Norinco.

== Description ==
The Fire Snake series includes two variants, FS70A and FS90A. The FS70A guided rocket is also known as the GR-5 guided rocket. The rocket can be fitted inside the FS70 rocket pod in an inverted trapezoid shape. The FS90A guided rocket, also known as the BRM-1, can be fitted inside the circular 7-tube 90 mm (3.543 in) rocket pod.

The Fire Snake rocket was initially advertised by Norinco at the 2021 Zhuhai Airshow. However, their appearance in the Chinese military can be traced back years prior, to the Tianjian (Chinese: 天箭; pinyin: tiān jiàn; lit. 'Sky Arrow') 90 mm (3.5 in) guided rocket produced by Harbin Jiancheng Group, which debuted on Zhuhai Airshow in 2012. The Tianjian 90 rocket has the provision for laser-guided seekers and received designation BRM-1.

The 90 mm (3.543 in) Fire Snake 90A (BRM-1) weighs 16.8–25 kg (37–55 lb), has a warhead of 4.8–5.6 kg (11–12 lb) with 1.3 kg (2.9 lb) TH50-50 high explosives. The range of the rocket is 8 km (4.3 nmi), and it uses semi-active laser guidance. The weapon can be fired in a salvo of 7 on the HF-7 launcher or a salvo of 20 on the HF-20 launcher. The 70 mm (2.756 in) Fire Snake 70A (GR-5) weighs 12.5 kg (28 lb) and has a range of 6 km (3.2 nmi). Both guided rockets feature inertial navigation system, with the FS90A having a sensor supporting terminal semi-active laser guidance.

== Variants ==
FS70A
70 mm (2.756 in) guided rocket with inertial navigation system. Can be fitted in FS70 rocket pod.
FS90A
90 mm (3.543 in) guided rocket with inertial navigation system and semi-active laser guidance. Can be fitted in the HF7 and HF20 rocket pod.

== See also ==
- Advanced Precision Kill Weapon System
- Guided Advanced Tactical Rocket
- Low-Cost Guided Imaging Rocket
