= Advanced Precision Kill Weapon System =

American 2.75-inch precision guided rocket

AGR-20 (APKWS II)
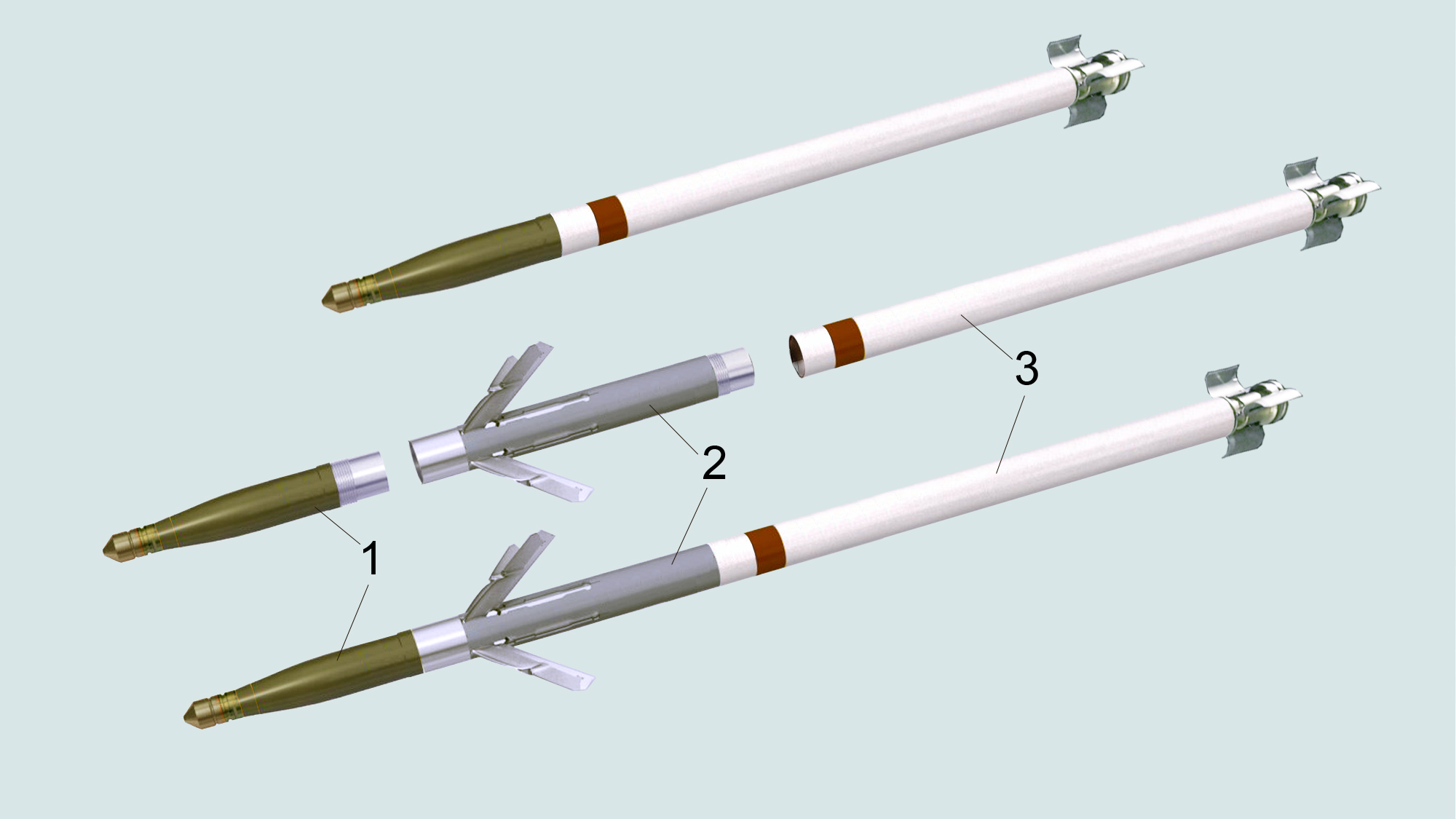
- Top: standard Hydra 70; Bottom: APKWS
- Type: Guided rocket
- Place of origin: United States

Service history
- In service: 2012–present
- Used by: See Foreign users

Production history
- Manufacturer: BAE Systems
- Unit cost: $22,000
- No. built: 100,000

Specifications
- Mass: 32 lb (15 kg)
- Length: 73.8 in (1.87 m)
- Diameter: 2.75 in (70 mm) (unfired)
- Effective firing range: 1,100–5,000 m (0.68–3.11 mi) (rotary wing); 2–11 km (1.2–6.8 mi) (fixed wing)

The Advanced Precision Kill Weapon System (APKWS) is a kit that equips Hydra 70 unguided rockets with laser guidance and turns them into precision-guided munitions (PGMs). The weapon bridges the gap between the Hydra 70 and AGM-114 Hellfire systems, providing a cheaper way to hit lightly armored targets. The original version never entered service; an upgraded version, the APKWS II, did, and is designated the AGR-19/AGR-20/AGR-21 with numerous variants.

The system uses Hydra 70 launchers, rocket motors, warheads, and fuzes, adding a mid-body guidance unit developed by BAE Systems to produce a laser-guided weapon that, compared to other U.S. PGMs, is about one-third the cost and weight, has a lower yield more suitable for avoiding collateral damage, and takes one-quarter of the time for ordnance personnel to load and unload.

APKWS is the U.S. government's only program of record for the semi-active, laser-guided 2.75 inches (70 mm) rocket. The winning bidder for the APKWS contract was the team of BAE Systems, Northrop Grumman and General Dynamics, beating the offerings from Lockheed Martin and Raytheon Systems.

In 2015, the APKWS was tested in live-fire exercises with the Forges de Zeebrugge unguided rocket, showing that it can convert other rocket types into PGMs.

== Design ==
The APKWS uses the Distributed Aperture Semi-Active Laser Seeker (DASALS) technology, which puts a laser seeker in the leading edge of each of the forward control canards, enabling Hydra 70 warheads to be used without the need for a laser seeker in the missile nose.

The APKWS system is composed of the launch platform, rockets equipped with the WGU-59/B mid-body guidance unit, the lengthened 7-tube LAU-68 F/A rocket launcher, the SCS 7 aiming cue (not needed for attack helicopters), and Fastpack PA-140 and CNU-711/E storage kits for rockets and guidance kits, respectively, to ensure they are safe in the field. The WGU-59/B mid-body guidance unit is equipped with DASALS seeker optics that deploy a half-second after launch. They are attached between the Mk 66 Mod 4 rocket motor and a warhead and fuze, increasing the Hydra 70's length by 18.5 in (47 cm) and weight by 9 lb (4.1 kg).

Its range is 1,100 to 5,000 meters; at the minimum range, the target can be struck less than five seconds after launch. Range is constrained by the existing Hydra 70 motor, but since the seeker can see as far as 14 km (8.7 mi), a more powerful motor could extend range while retaining accuracy. Nammo is working on a modified rocket motor that can extend range to 12–15 km (7.5–9.3 mi).

A software upgrade of the APKWS was planned for late 2021; the upgrade increases range by 30% by means of an optimized flight trajectory to engage targets at a steeper angle of attack, while also being qualified on both fixed- and rotary-wing aircraft in a single variant and improving the surface danger zone logic for better training range options.

In June 2021, BAE tested the APKWS in a counter-unmanned aerial systems (C-UAS) role. An APKWS-equipped rocket was fitted with a proximity fuze and destroyed a Class 2 UAS. The proximity fuze enables it to intercept UAS at a lower cost than other methods, and due to the rocket's laser guidance that activates on launch it does not require locking on to the target before launch.

In April 2025, a new dual-mode APKWS II variant with a full-scale mockup was revealed, featuring a passive infrared sensor as well as the original's laser-guidance, allowing the weapon to be fired with "anoint-and-shoot" capability (where the target is initially lased to orient the missile, but the lase is not maintained and the infrared sensor takes over for terminal guidance) to increase rate of fire, particularly against large numbers of cruise missile or unmanned aerial vehicle targets. The addition of the nose-mounted infrared seeker necessitated moving the warhead to the mid-body of the rocket, which provides an improved blast- fragmentation pattern with no loss of lethality; however modifications increase the cost compared to the original. Development is expected to be completed by the end of 2026.

=== Specifications ===
- Length: 73.8 in (1.87 m)
- Diameter: 2.75 in (70 mm)
- Wingspan: 9.55 in (24.3 cm)
- Weight: 32 lb (15 kg)
- Speed: 1,000 m/s (3,600 km/h; 2,200 mph; Mach 2.9) at max
- Range: 1,100–5,000 m (0.68–3.11 mi) (rotary wing); 2–11 km (1.2–6.8 mi) (fixed wing)
- Guidance: Semi-active laser homing
- CEP: <0.5 meters
- Motor: Existing Hydra 70 motors
- Warhead: Existing Hydra 70 warhead

== Program status ==
- 2002: APKWS development test series begins.
- April 2005: General Dynamics APKWS program cancelled due to poor test results.
- September 2005: Successful flight test of BAE APKWS II.
- October 2005: Competition reopened as APKWS II.
- April 2006: BAE Systems selected as prime contractor for the APKWS II program.
- February 2007: Funding for program withdrawn in proposed FY2008 budget.
- May 2007: Successful flight test of BAE APKWS II in production-ready configuration.
- November 2008: Transfer of contract from US Army to US Navy.

=== Deployment ===
- March 2012: APKWS II achieves initial operating capability (IOC) and is sent to Afghanistan with the United States Marine Corps. Plans are to integrate it onto the MQ-8 Fire Scout.
- July 2012: BAE Systems receives full-rate production contract for APKWS from the U.S. Navy. The first FRP deliveries were in October 2012 and the company expected the next FRP option to be awarded by the end of 2012.
- September 2012: The Navy awards a contract to officially integrate the APKWS into the Fire Scout.
- October 2012: BAE announces its intention to modify the APKWS II to be fired from fixed-wing tactical fighter platforms.
- January 2013: Additional conversion kits ordered. No in flight failures during the 100 combat launches in Afghanistan to date.
- February 2013: APKWS launched from an A-10 Thunderbolt II. Three sorties were conducted. The first sortie carried the rocket and launcher, and the second sortie fired an inert, unguided rocket to ensure the weapon would separate from the aircraft. Two armed rockets were fired during the third sortie from 10,000 and 15,000 feet. The second rocket launched into a 70 knot headwind, and both impacted within inches of the target. The Air Force is considering using the APKWS II operationally by 2015 if further testing is successful.
- March 2013: APKWS is integrated onto the Bell 407GT.
- April 2013: A UH-1Y Venom fired 10 APKWS rockets at stationary and moving small boat targets, scoring 100 percent accurate hits on single and multiple targets over water. The engagement ranged from 2–4 km using inert Mk152 high explosive and MK149 flechette warheads. The UH-1Y had the boats designated by an MH-60S.
- October 2013: APKWS successfully fired from an AH-64 Apache. Eight rockets were fired with the helicopter flying at up to 150 kn (170 mph; 280 km/h) and up to 5 km (3.1 mi) from the target. Launch altitudes ranged from 300 ft to 1,500 ft. BAE wants airworthiness qualification on the Apache for international sales to AH-64 operators.
- March 2014: LAU-61 G/A Digital Rocket Launcher (DRL) deployed with HSC-15.
- July 2014: BAE reveals that the APKWS has reached Early Operational Capability (EOC) with one squadron of MH-60S helicopters. The MH-60R will be outfitted within "12-18 months."
- August 2014: APKWS tested on Australian Army Eurocopter Tiger at Woomera Test Range. A helicopter was on the ground and fired seven rockets which successfully hit their targets. The rocket could enter Australian service by early 2015 on army Tigers and navy MH-60R helicopters.
- November 2014: APKWS tested on Australian Army, 16 Aviation Brigade, Eurocopter Tigers, this time airborne, near Darwin. Tests included using APKWS to convert a Forges de Zeebrugge (FZ) unguided rocket into a laser precision-guided weapon. All 10 rockets struck within a metre of the laser spot.
- October 2015: US Army AH-64 Apache helicopters to field weapon in Iraq and Afghanistan.
- March 2016: First rocket variants for launch from fixed-wing aircraft shipped to Marine Corps Harriers.
- June 2016: APKWS deployed on USAF F-16 and A-10 as part of an urgent operational requirement.
- October 2016: Production rate increased to 5,000 a year.
- June 2016-January 2017: 200 APKWS used against ISIL targets, including 60 during the Battle of Mosul.
- February 2018: First operational deployment of APKWS on Marine Corps legacy F/A-18 Hornets.
- December 2019: US Air Force demonstrates air-to-air capability of AGR-20A to cue off Sniper Advanced Targeting Pod and intercept low-flying cruise missiles.

In December 2019, the 85th Test and Evaluation Squadron at Eglin AFB, Florida, conducted a test using APKWS rocket against a drone representing a cruise missile. By adapting the rocket for cruise missile defense, it can serve the same role as the much more expensive AIM-120 missile, according to an Air Force release. "The test was unprecedented and will shape the future of how the Air Force executes CMD," Col. Ryan Messer, commander of the 53d Wing at Eglin, said in a release. "This is a prime example of how the 53d Wing is using resources readily available to establish innovative ways that enhance combat capabilities for our combat units."

In June 2020, BAE announced they had completed test firings of the APKWS from a ground launcher for the first time. Several rockets were fired from an Arnold Defense-built launcher called the Fletcher designed specifically for ground vehicles, demonstrating the weapon's ability to address a demand for standoff ground-to-ground precision munitions for small ground units. In April 2024, the U.S. Navy ordered five Electronic Advanced Ground Launcher Systems (EAGLS) for rapid delivery in response to an urgent need to respond to UAS threats in the Middle East. EAGLS is a self-contained system consisting of a four-round APKWS launcher, a sensor turret with EO/IR cameras, and an RPS-40 radar.

In 2024, a new model of the APKWS, the AGR-20F FALCO (Fixed Wing, Air Launched, Counter-Unmanned Aircraft Systems Ordnance) was officially integrated onto U.S. Air Force F-16s of the 510th Expeditionary Fighter Squadron from Aviano Air Base, Italy, deployed to the Middle East, successfully downing Houthi loitering munitions over the Red Sea. Designed to counter low-cost one-way attack drone swarms and cruise missiles, the air-to-air rocket variant adapts standard 2.75-inch (70 mm) Hydra 70 rockets with a mid-body guidance unit and specialized nose-mounted long-wave infrared (LWIR) / dual-mode seeker capabilities. It features a M151 high-explosive warhead paired with a dual safe proximity fuze for airburst target detection and reaches speeds up to Mach 2.9 with its effective engagement ranges generally spanning of up to 7.5 to over 12 kilometers depending on the launch platform and altitude. In August of the same year, combatant commanders issued a Joint Urgent Operational Need (JUON) (Designation CC-0588) to scale up low-cost defenses against Group 3 drone swarms. In October, the 480th Expeditionary Fighter Squadron from Spangdahlem Air Base, Germany, scored dozens of kills using the rockets over Yemen. In May 2025, the U.S. Air Force 96th and 53rd Test Wings successfully tested and integrated the weapon onto the F-15E Strike Eagle. In February 2026, the Air Force Life Cycle Management Center awarded BAE Systems a US$145 million contract to upgrade the AGR-20F into a dual-mode weapon by adding a Long-Wave Infrared (LWIR) seeker. In late 2026, prototyping and testing of the munition's dual-mode variant on U.S. Navy MH-60S helicopters was concluded.

The AGR-20F FALCO has proven to be in high demand; the U.S. government found the munition critical enough that it diverted 30,000 proximity fuzes intended for Ukraine for surface-to-air muse to the Middle East for use on its fighters with the issuance of the "Secretary of Defense Identified Urgent Issue" by U.S. Defense Secretary Pete Hegseth, intended to prioritize the protection of U.S. troops, aircraft, and bases in the Middle East. Before this redirection, the munitions were funded under the Ukraine Security Assistance Initiative (USAI). Ukrainian President Volodymyr Zelensky expressed frustration over the sudden loss, claiming that Ukraine had counted on those specific 20,000 munitions to counter Russia’s relentless Shahed drone strikes.

Countries across the Middle East and the United Kingdom are ordering the APKWS, particularly for use on their Eurofighter Typhoons. The British Army has fielded air-to-air APKWS on some of its Apache helicopters.

== Foreign users ==
- (Australia) Have been configured for use on the FZ Rocket for the Eurocopter Tiger since November 2014, the Hydra 70 rockets with the Royal Australian Navy MH-60R Seahawk since April 2015, and are expected to be fielded aboard the AH-64E Apache Guardian.
- On 14 April 2014, the U.S. Navy signed an agreement with the Jordanian Air Force for the first international sale of the APKWS for use on the CN-235 gunship. Jordan received 110 units in late November 2015.
- In November 2014, the State Department approved the sale of up to 2,000 APKWS rockets to Iraq.
- (Lebanon) In June 2015, a deal to sell 6 A-29 Super Tucano light attack aircraft to the Lebanese Air Force was approved that included the sale of 2,000 APKWS rockets for use on the turboprops. The US$462 million sale was financed by Saudi Arabia.
- (Mexico) In April 2018, the U.S. State Department approved the future sale of APKWS units to the Mexican Navy at the same time that they approved the sale of eight MH-60R helicopters.
- Ukraine is being supplied with APKWS rockets following the Russian invasion of Ukraine. As part of an aid package announced by the U.S. in August 2022, the L3Harris Vehicle-Agnostic Modular Palletized ISR Rocket Equipment (VAMPIRE) system was ordered to be sent to Ukraine. The system consists of a sensor ball and a four-barreled APKWS rocket launcher that can be mounted on trucks. While it can direct laser-guided rockets on ground targets, the Pentagon specified it as a counter-UAS system. The company said the kit could be ready for delivery by May 2023. L3Harris was formally given a $40 million purchase order in January 2023. The award was part of a U.S. Navy prototype contract that pre-dated the war; field testing had begun in 2021 and after the system was submitted to the DoD in April 2022, range and durability tests were conducted in the summer. 14 kits would be installed on vehicles the U.S. provided Ukraine, with four systems to be delivered by mid-2023 and 10 more by the end of the year. Videos started appearing in May 2023 of Ukrainian-operated M1152 Humvees fitted with LGR4 four-shot launchers firing APKWS. In September, the Pentagon confirmed the first four VAMPIREs had arrived in Ukraine in mid-2023. All 14 systems were delivered by December 2023. On 25 January 2025, reports emerged of a boat-mounted Vampire missile equipped with APKWS successfully shooting down a Russian Kh-59 cruise missile over the Black Sea.
- In April 2023, the US government approved a $31.1 million deal to provide the United Kingdom with up to 768 APKWS-IIs, which will equip Apache AH-64E attack helicopters of the British Army. The Eurofighter Typhoon tested APKWS in April 2026. In May 2026, it was announced that the system was operational with Typhoons of No. 9 Squadron RAF in the Middle East theater.
- In July 2023, the Czech Republic started taking deliveries of Bell AH-1Z Viper helicopters along with APKWS-II rockets.
- (Saudi Arabia) In March 2025, the U.S. State Department approved the future sale of 2,000 APKWS units and spare parts worth $100 million to the KSA.
- In May 2026, the U.S. State Department approved Israel's request to purchase 10,000 APKWS units and associated items at a cost of $992.4 million.

== Launch platforms ==
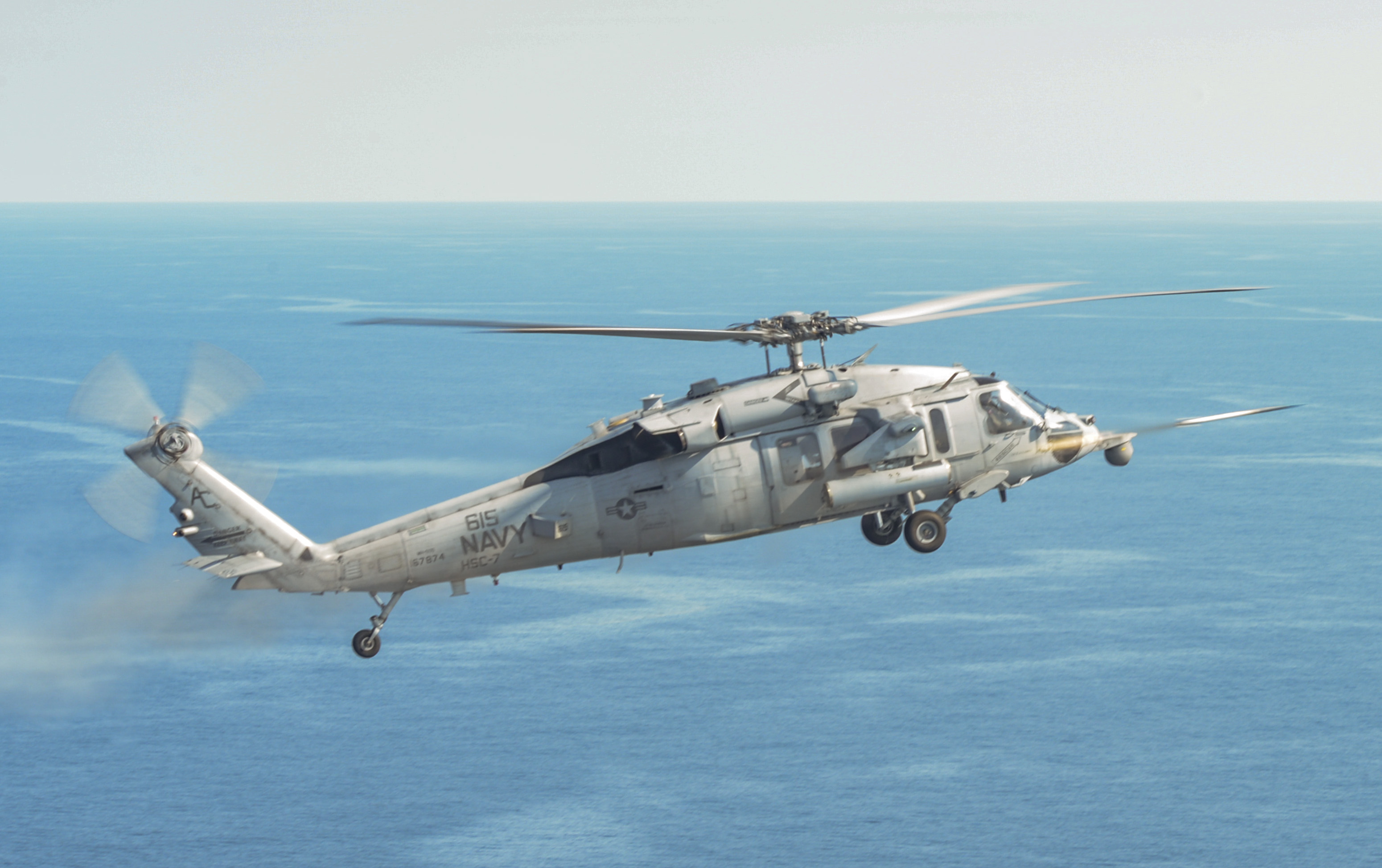
APKWS II launched from SH-60S/MH-60S Seahawk

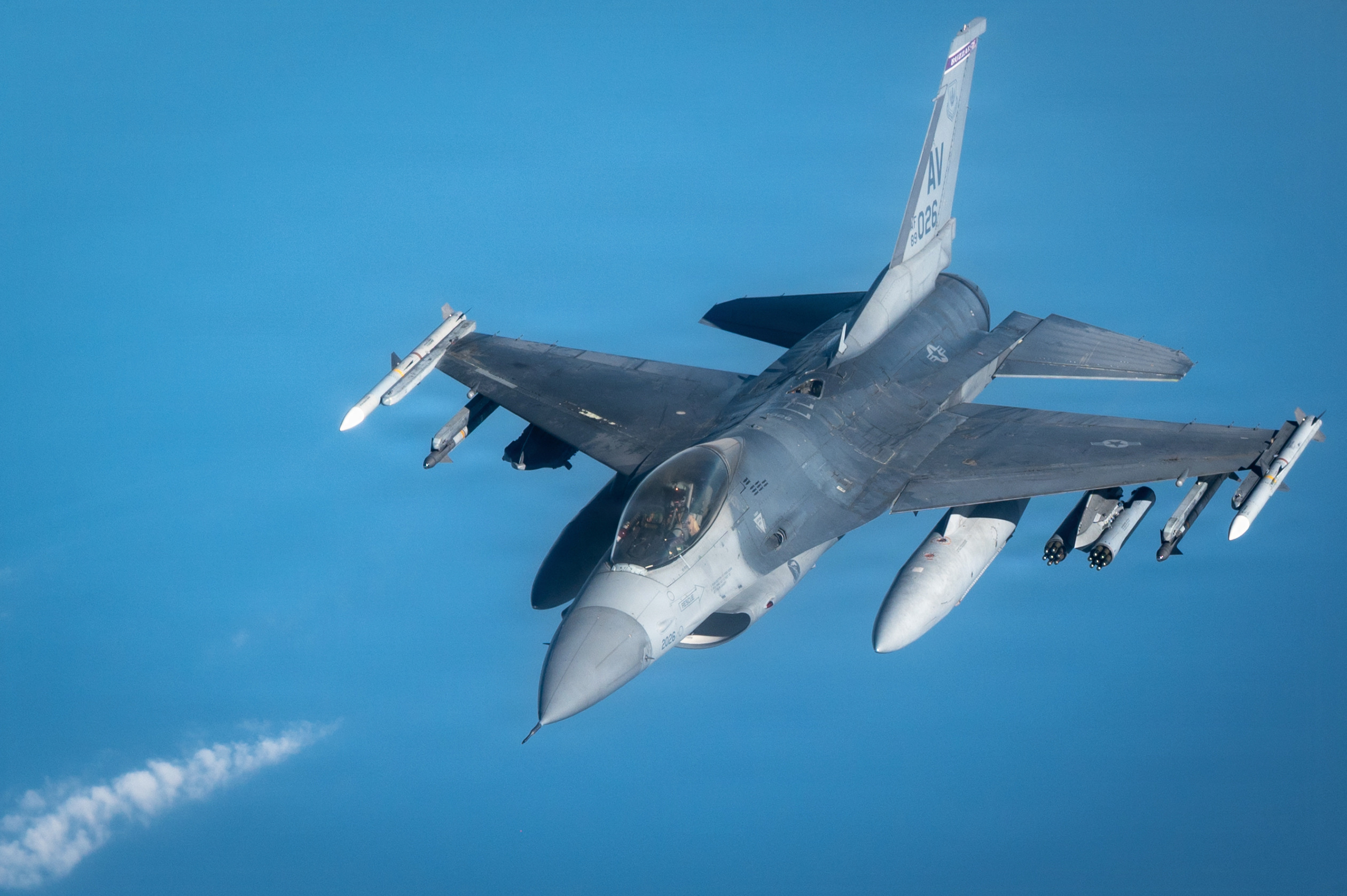
USAF F-16C counter-UCAV load out with two LAU-131 rocket pods

- Current rotary wing:
  - UH-1Y Venom
  - AH-1W SuperCobra
  - AH-1Z Viper
  - Bell 407GT
  - AH-64 Apache
  - Eurocopter Tiger
  - MV-22 Osprey
  - MH-60S/R Seahawk
- Current fixed-wing
  - A-29 Super Tucano
  - AV-8B Harrier II
  - OV-10 Bronco
  - F-16 Fighting Falcon
  - F/A-18 Hornet
  - A-10 Thunderbolt II
  - L3Harris OA-1K Skyraider II
  - F-15E Strike Eagle
  - Eurofighter Typhoon
  - Aero L-39 Skyfox Drone Hunter
- Planned rotary wing
  - OH-58 Kiowa (company funded)
  - AH-6i
- Planned fixed-wing
  - CN-235
  - Saab JAS 39 Gripen
- Ground-based air defence
  - Vehicle-Agnostic Modular Palletized Intelligence, surveillance and reconnaissance (ISR) Rocket Equipment (VAMPIRE)
  - A portable kit that can be installed on most vehicles with a cargo bed for the launching of the APKWS II laser-guided rockets or other laser-guided munitions.
  - Electronic Advanced Ground Launcher System (EAGLS) is a vehicle-mounted, cost-effective counter-drone weapon system developed by MSI Defense Solutions. It uses a 70-mm rocket launcher firing laser-guided munitions like the Advanced Precision Kill Weapon System (APKWS) to shoot down low-cost unmanned aerial threats at a fraction of traditional missile costs

== See also ==
- Direct Attack Guided Rocket (DAGR) – system under development to provide plug-and-play compatibility with Hellfire launchers
- Fire Snake 70 (FS70) – Chinese guided rocket
- Guided Advanced Tactical Rocket (GATR)
- Low-Cost Guided Imaging Rocket (LOGIR) – South Korean Hydra 70 conversion kit for surface-to-ship role
- Martlet (LMM) – British lightweight multirole missile
- Roketsan Cirit – Turkish laser-guided 70 mm missile system
- Ugroza – Russian laser-guidance conversion kit for unguided bombs
