= Direct Attack Guided Rocket =

Weapons system developed by Lockheed Martin

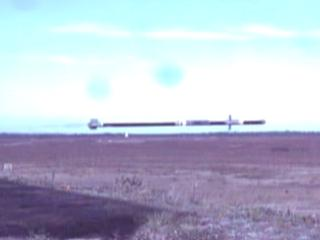
The Direct Attack Guided Rocket (DAGR) in flight over Eglin AFB.

The Direct Attack Guided Rocket (DAGR) is a weapons system under development by Lockheed Martin. The program goal is to provide a low cost 2.75 inch (70 mm) precision guided rocket which is compatible with existing Hellfire II systems and launchers in service. The system will use components from the existing Hydra 70 rocket, but differs from other upgrades to the Hydra 70 such as APKWS and LOGIR in that it is designed to be plug and play compatible with the Hellfire missile and use the M299 Hellfire launcher, increasing the load-out by up to four times. DAGR also offers a lock-on before launch capability that is not compatible with the electronics in existing Hydra 70 launchers.

== Specifications ==
- Diameter: 2.75 in (70 mm)
- Length: 75 in (1.9 m)
- Wingspan: 8.75 in (222 mm)
- Weight: 35.0 lb (15.8 kg)
- Guidance: Semi-active laser homing (SALH).
- Range from Sea Level: Min: 1.5 km Max: 5 km
- Range from 20,000 feet (6,100 m): 12 km.
- Motor: Existing Hydra 70 motors.
- Warhead: M151 warhead with M423 fuze

== Program status ==
- March 2005 – Program started.
- February 2006 – 1st flight test.
- October 2008 – 8th flight test and 1st ever 2.75" guided rocket live warhead flight test.
- March 2009 – 1st platform flight test – AH-64D Apache attack helicopter.
- July 2009 – 2nd platform flight test – AH-6 Little Bird: successfully hit the target in two separate trials.
- March 2010 – 3rd platform test – Lockheed Martin's DAGR guided rocket fires successfully from Kiowa Warrior helicopter.
- May 2012 – DAGR hits a truck target moving 25 mph (40 km/h) fired from an AH-64D Apache 3.5 km away.
- September 2012 – DAGR successfully hits stationary targets while launched from ground-based mounts. Two missiles flew 3.5 kilometers and hit the target within one foot of the illuminated laser spot.
- February 2013 – DAGR is launched from a Lockheed Martin JLTV. It locked onto the laser spot two seconds after launch, flew 5 km (3.1 mi) down range and impacted the target within 1 meter of the laser spot.
- March 2014 – DAGR completed airworthiness tests from the AH-64D Apache, hitting all 16 targets within 1 meter of the laser spot from 1.5 to 5.1 km (0.93 to 3.17 mi). Over 40 DAGRs had been fired in total since the start of the program.
- June 2014 – DAGR and Hellfire II are launched from Lockheed Martin's Long Range Surveillance and Attack Vehicle (LRSAV) turreted weapon system, which allows targeting and employment of missiles from ground platforms. The Hellfire and DAGR missiles hit targets at 6.4 km (4.0 mi) and 3.5 km (2.2 mi) respectively, with both demonstrating lock-on-before-launch and lock-on-after-launch capabilities, and one being designated by an AH-64D Apache helicopter.

== Export ==
Following the Royal Jordanian Air Force's purchase of Boeing AH-6 helicopters, Lockheed offered to equip them with DAGRs.

== See also ==
- Advanced Precision Kill Weapon System – (United States)
- Low-Cost Guided Imaging Rocket – (South Korea)
- Barq – (Pakistan)
- Guided Advanced Tactical Rocket - Laser – (United States, Israel)
- Roketsan Cirit – (Turkey)
- Ugroza – (Russia)
- FZ275 LGR – (Belgium)
