= VAMPIRE (weapon) =

Anti-UAV weapons system

Vehicle-Agnostic Modular Palletised ISR Rocket Equipment (VAMPIRE) is a family of portable, modular weapon systems developed by L3Harris primarily to Counter-Unmanned Aerial Systems (C-UAS) and other low-flying aircraft, but is capable of multiple functions. The VAMPIRE system acts as a low-cost countermeasure against drones, reducing the need for more expensive interceptors.

As of 2025, L3Harris is capable of producing 20-40 VAMPIRE systems per month. In March 2026 high-volume production of VAMPIRE systems began in Huntsville, Alabama.

== Design ==
The VAMPIRE is a portable kit that can be installed on a wide variety of vehicles with a cargo bed or fixed position. The base VAMPIRE system consists of a four-round LAND-LGR4 launcher for 70 mm laser-guided rockets, primarily the APKWS II, with an electro-optical/infrared modular sensor ball such as WESCAM MX-RSTA, and a laser designator elevated on a telescoping mast as well as a self-contained power supply and a control system.

Later variants use artificial intelligence and machine learning algorithms from Shield AI that allows detection and identification of drones from a greater distance. The AI integration makes the VAMPIRE capable of targeting small UAVs from Groups 1 to 3, even small targets such as FPV drones.

Other variants include electronic warfare and base defense turrets.

== Operational history ==
=== 2022 Russo-Ukrainian war ===
Several systems were supplied to Ukraine in 2022 as part of a US$3 billion aid package by the US. Ukrainian VAMPIRE systems use both the APKWS II and Thales 70 mm FZ275 LGR rocket with an FZ123 warhead.

== Variants ==
- VAMPIRE Stalker XR: Enlarged launcher with 12 missiles.
- VAMPIRE CASKET (Containerized Anti-drone System with Kinetic Effects Turret): Containerized version.
- VAMPIRE BAT (Base Anti-drone Turret): Static turret with a missile launcher replaced with a machine gun. High-power microwave (HPM) directed-energy weapon option under development.
- VAMPIRE Black Wake: Variant mounted aboard uncrewed surface vessels.
- VAMPIRE Dead Wing: Variant for attack helicopters such as the Apache.
- VAMPIRE Killcode: Variant that replaces kinetic weapons with an electronic warfare system.
