= TL6 =

TL6 may refer to:

- TL-6 (Tian Long 6; Sky Dragon 6), a Chinese anti-ship missile from HAIG
- TL-6 (Tianlong 6; Sky Dragon 6), a Chinese air defense missile from AVIC1, a variant of the TY-90
- TL6, a bus route operated by the State Transport Authority (South Australia)
- TL6, a protein and gene; an alternate name for TNFSF18

== See also ==
- TL (disambiguation)
- Tianlong
