= Roketsan Cirit =

Cirit
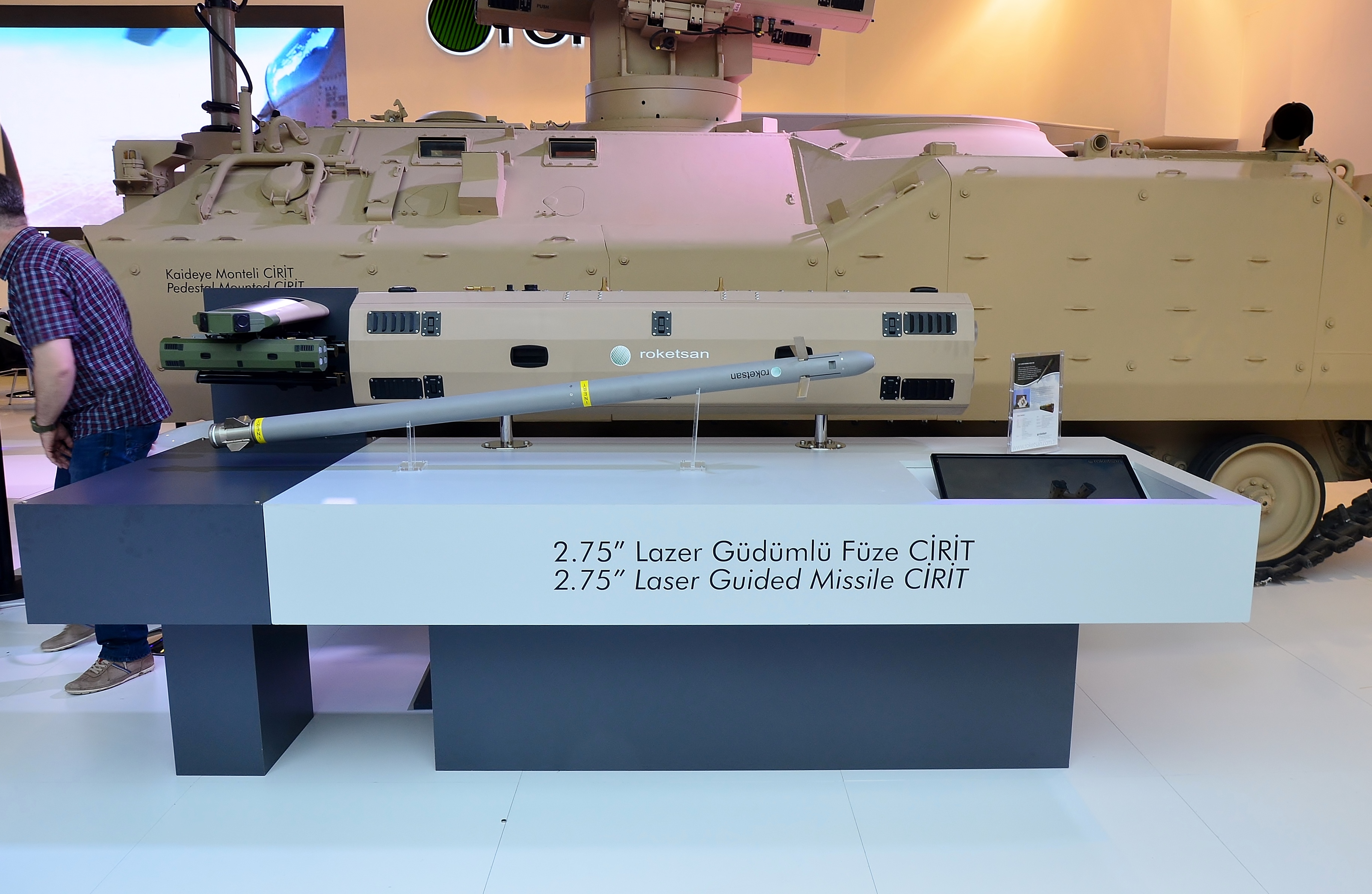
- IDEF 2015
- Type: Air-to-surface, anti-armor and anti-personnel missile
- Place of origin: Turkey

Service history
- Used by: Turkish Army, UAE Army
- Wars: Kurdish–Turkish conflict (1978–present); Syrian Civil War; Operation Olive Branch; Second Nagorno-Karabakh War

Production history
- Designed: 2004 – 2009
- Manufacturer: ROKETSAN
- Produced: 2011 - present

Specifications
- Mass: 15 kg
- Length: 1.9 m
- Diameter: 2.75" (70 mm)
- Warhead: Tri-Mode: Anti Armour, Anti Personnel and Incendiary Anti Personnel: Increased Anti Personnel and Incendiary Thermobaric: Increased Anti Personnel and Anti Structure
- Warhead weight: 3 kg insensitive explosive
- Engine: Solid-fuel rocket
- Operational range: 1.5 - 8 km
- Guidance system: Midcourse Guidance: MEMS-IMU, MEMS-INS, Magnetometer; Terminal Guidance: Semi-Active Laser Seeker
- Steering system: Pop-out fins
- Launch platform: Attack Helicopter; Unmanned Aerial Vehicle; TAI Hürkuş; Land combat vehicle Naval platforms Stationary platforms

External images
- Launch and Warhead test
- Tri-Mode Warhead
- moving target

Cirit is a laser-guided 70 mm missile system under production by Turkish arms industry manufacturer ROKETSAN. It is one of the projects launched by Turkey to equip the Turkish Army's T-129 Atak, AH-1P Cobra and AH-1W Super Cobra attack helicopters with low-cost precision strike capabilities. It has been selected by Eurocopter for execution of a test and integration program to equip the Eurocopter EC635. The weapon's name comes from a traditional Turkish horseback game, Cirit (pronounced Jirit), where two teams of riders fight a mock battle using wooden javelins which are called cirit.

== Description ==
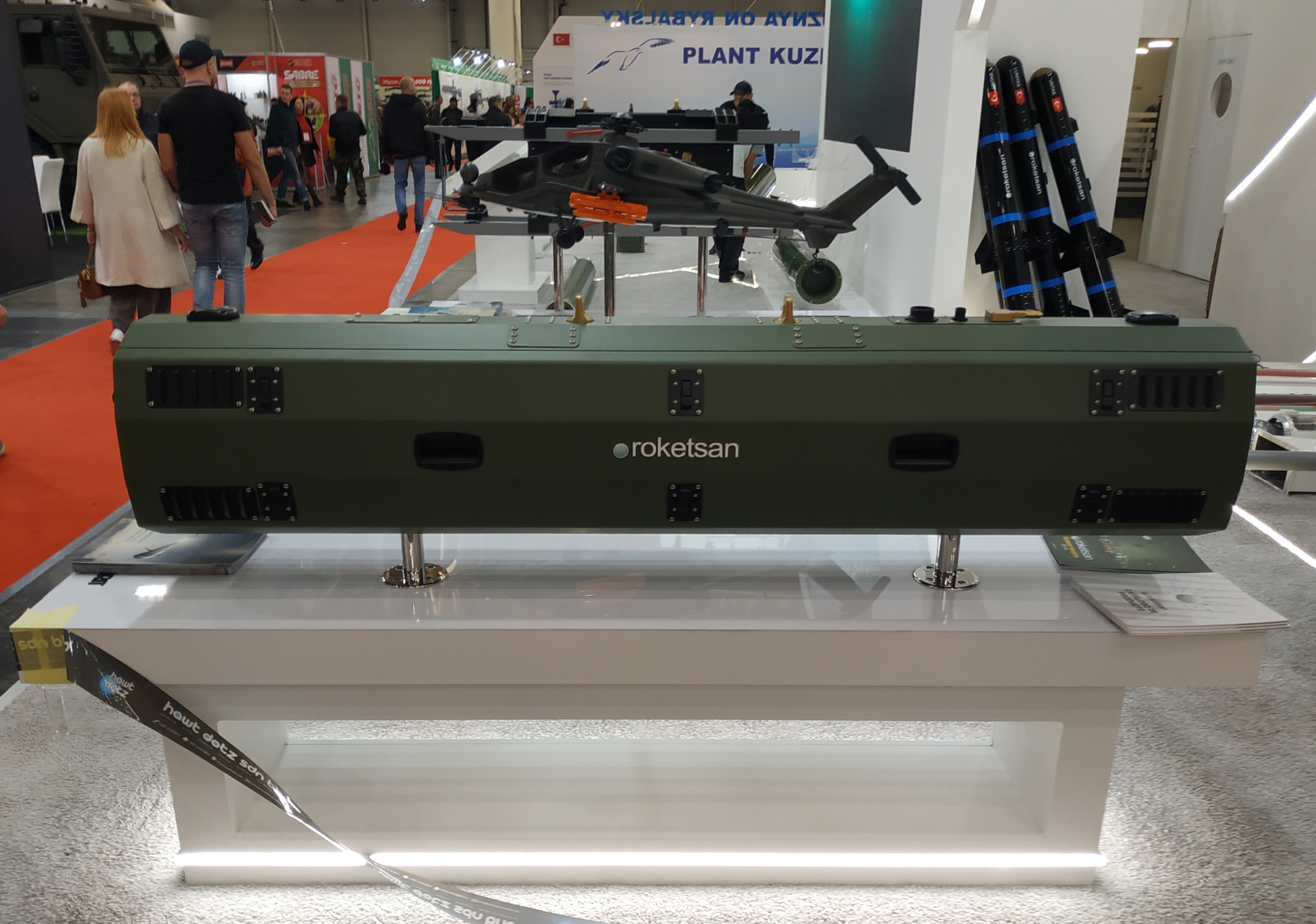
Cirit launcher with four missiles

Cirit is a 70 mm (2.75 in) guided missile system fitted with a semi-active laser homing seeker. The seeker and guidance section is attached to a purpose-built warhead with a Class 5 Insensitive Munition (IM). The multipurpose warhead has a combined armour-piercing ammunition with enhanced behind armor anti-personnel and incendiary effects. The engine is of reduced smoke design, with IM properties. It is connected to the rear section by a roll bearing that enables it to rotate in flight. There are four small stabilising surfaces at the very rear of the missile in front of the exhaust nozzle that ensures stable flight. Roketsan has developed a new launch pod and a new canister in which Cirit is delivered as an all-up round. The Cirit has a maximum effective guided range of 8 km with a high probability of hit on a 3×3 m target at this range.

== Development ==
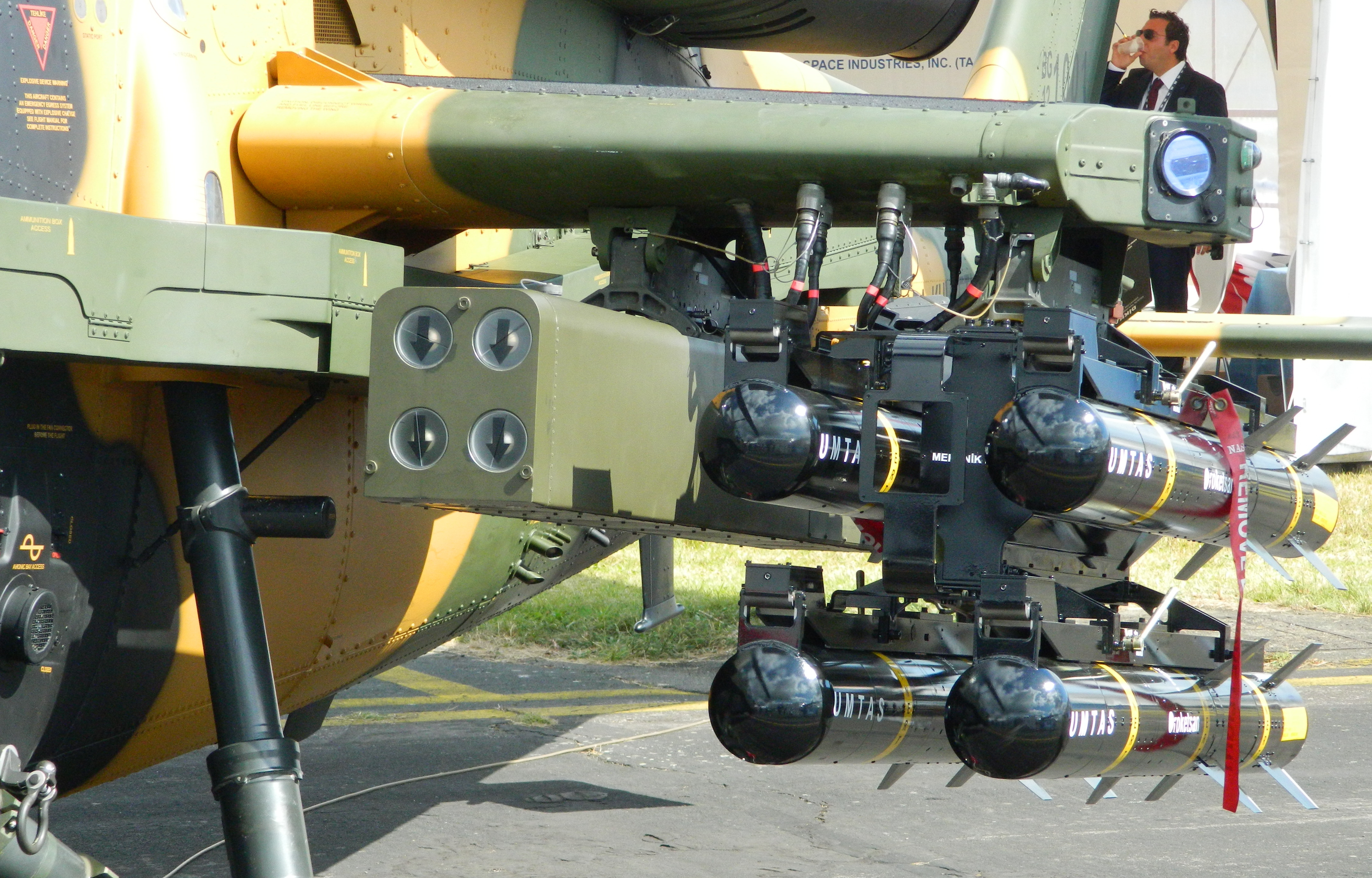
T129 ATAK attack helicopter armed with four Cirit (left)

Initial work on the Cirit design began in 2004 and it was first shown in public during IDEF 2007. Roketsan had opted not to follow the lead of other similar 70 mm (2.75 in) guided rocket programmes and has developed the Cirit as an all-up round and not as an add-on guidance kit for existing unguided rockets. This has seen the company work on several new components for the rocket including its semi-active laser seeker, actuation and control systems, bearings, computer hardware and software. Multipurpose high performance warhead, motor and specific container were designed and developed by TUBITAK-SAGE. The Cirit is designed for use with existing 70 mm rocket launchers such as the LAU-61, LAU-68, LAU-130, LAU-131, M260 and M261. Roketsan is also developing a new series of digital launchers, with seven and 19 tubes, to take advantage of the Cirit's MIL-STD-1760 databus capabilities.

It has been in production since 2010 and 5000 units have been delivered to customers.

12 January 2010, Roketsan's Cirit is the first 2.75" laser guided rocket to engage moving targets. Cirit successfully engaged a moving target travelling at 60 km/h while the platform (AH-1W Super Cobra) it was fired from was moving at 220 km/h (120 knots).

12 May 2011, Roketsan signed an agreement with Turkish Aerospace Industries (TAI) for the integration of its Cirit Smart Launcher System on the T-129 attack helicopter.

2012: Delivery to the Turkish Armed Forces

2014: Delivery to the UAE Armed Forces

2018: Serialized production of the shortened (970mm) unpowered MAM-C micro munition based on the Cirit.

2024: The PUSU system was developed. It is a low-cost, mobile weapon system developed by Roketsan, primarily mounted on 4x4 pickup trucks like the Toyota Hilux. Designed for high mobility and rapid deployment, serves as an anti-drone platform. Its primary armament is the 70mm CİRİT laser-guided missile.

== Export ==
- Roketsan is in talks with Australian Defence Force officials for the possible sale of the Cirit.
- Roketsan has signed a memorandum of understanding with Eurocopter to execute a test program for integration of the Cirit to Eurocopter EC635.
- At IDEX'13, Roketsan has contracted a US$196.2 million deal with UAE for the export of an undisclosed number of Cirit rockets. The order was received from Tawazun on behalf of UAE Armed Forces.
- ROKETSAN and European defense company MBDA signed an agreement on cooperation in the production and integration of CIRIT on 22 May 2014.
- In June 2026, at the Eurosatory defence exhibition in Paris, Roketsan signed a memorandum of understanding (MoU) with EM&E Group (EME Group) to integrate the CIRIT C-UAS variant into the company's remote weapon stations. The collaboration aims to combine Roketsan's laser-guided C-UAS missile with EME Group's weapon station platforms to provide counter-unmanned aerial system capabilities for modern battlefield requirements.

== Users ==
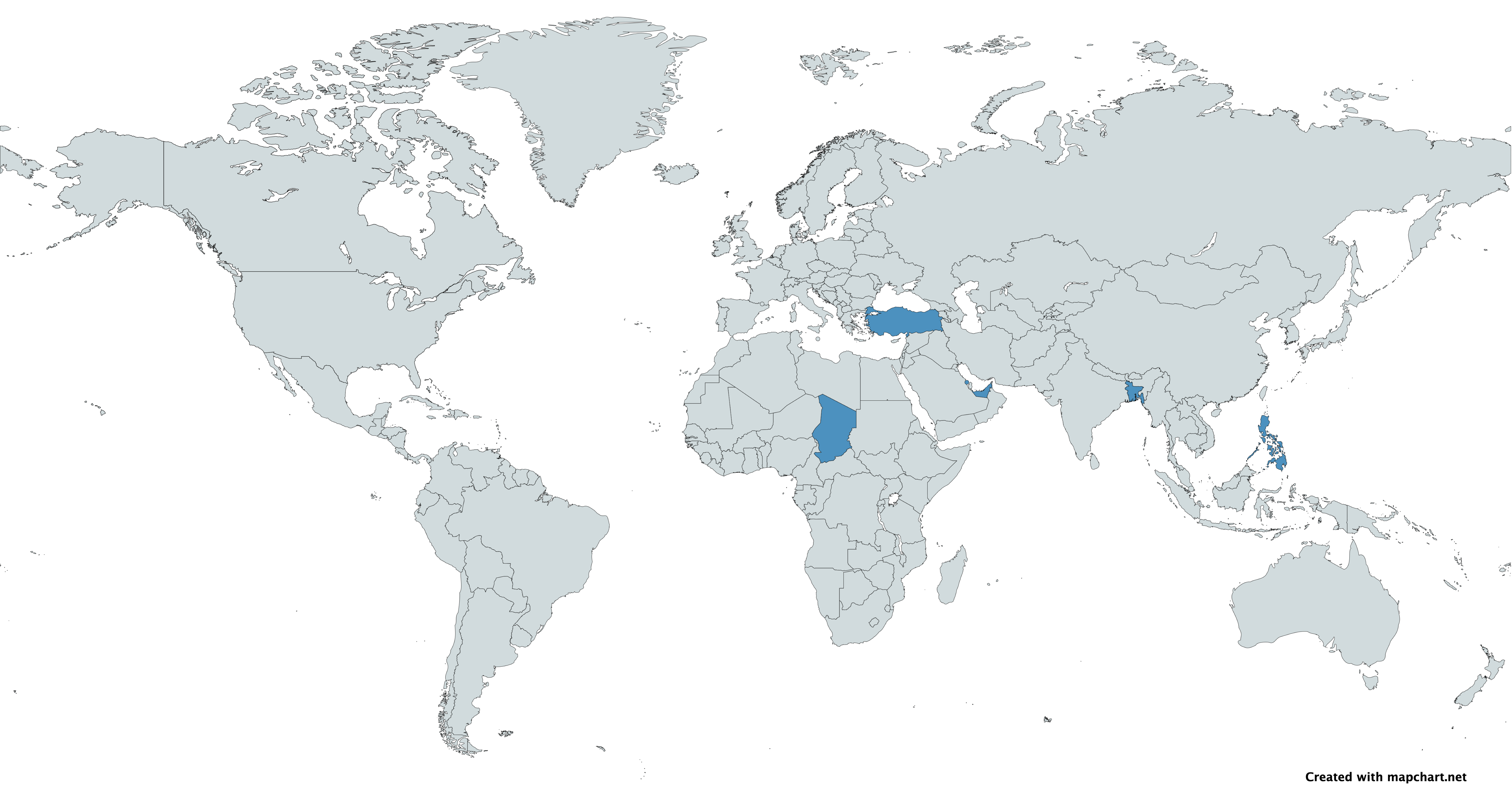
Map with Roketsan Cirit users in blue

- Albania
- Bahrain
- Bangladesh integrated on Salex ES Falco
- Chad
- Spain
- Philippines
- Turkey
- United Arab Emirates

== See also ==
- MAM (Smart Micro Munition) – (Turkey)
- Advanced Precision Kill Weapon System – (United States)
- Direct Attack Guided Rocket – (United States)
- Guided Advanced Tactical Rocket - Laser – (United States, Israel)
- TAipers – (South Korea)
- Ugroza – (Russia)
- FZ275 LGR – (Belgium)
- Çakır (missile) – (Turkey)
