= Low-Cost Guided Imaging Rocket =

South Korean 2.75-inch precision guided rocket

Poniard Low-Cost Guided Imaging Rocket 비궁 지대함 유도 로켓
- Type: Surface-to-ship rocket
- Place of origin: South Korea

Service history
- In service: 2017–present
- Used by: See Operators

Production history
- Designer: Agency for Defense Development; LIG Nex1
- Manufacturer: LIG Defense & Aerospace (2016–present); Emirates Defence Group Estates (2022–present)
- Produced: 2016–present

Specifications
- Mass: 14 kilograms (31 lb)
- Length: 1.9 meters (6.2 ft)
- Diameter: 70 millimeters (2.75 in)
- Maximum firing range: 8 kilometers (5.0 mi)
- Warhead: High explosive
- Warhead weight: 4 kilograms (8.8 lb)
- Propellant: Single-stage solid propellant
- Operational range: Detection: 12 kilometers (7.5 mi); Tracking: 9 kilometers (5.6 mi)
- Guidance system: INS/IIR with Fire-and-forget
- Accuracy: 0.54 meters CEP

The Low-Cost Guided Imaging Rocket (LOGIR; Korean: 저비용 유도 영상 로켓), officially known as Poniard (Korean: 비궁; Hanja: 匕弓; RR: Bi-gung) is a surface-to-ship guided rocket developed by Agency for Defense Development (ADD) and LIG Nex1. The LOGIR was a weapons system under development for the US Navy as part of ONR's Low-Cost Imaging Terminal Seeker (LCITS) FNC. It transitioned as the weapon used in the Medusa Joint Capability Technology Demonstration with South Korea.

Poniard successfully passed four Foreign Comparative Testing (FCT) organized by the U.S. Department of Defense from 2019 to 2024 after achieving 100% accuracy.

== Development ==
The program provided a precision guided 2.75 inch (70 mm) rocket for use with existing Hydra 70 systems in service, as such it has many similarities with the Advanced Precision Kill Weapon System program. The principal difference between the systems is that while APKWS uses terminal laser homing, requiring the target to be 'painted' until impact, LOGIR would guide to a position supplied by the launching aircraft, using imaging infrared in the terminal phase making it a true fire-and-forget weapon. Another advantage of LOGIR was that it was "especially effective against swarm attacks by enemies like small boats, as there’s no need for ongoing guidance."

The South Korean version, designated Poniard (Korean: 비궁; RR: Bi-gung), is used on the ROK Marine Corps mobile coastal defense system. Bigung is a 6×6 truck fitted with 2×18-round containers for 36 rockets to counter North Korean Fast Inshore Attack Craft (FIAC), landing craft and landing vehicles. The rockets are equipped with the LCITS using IIR imaging technology with an additional low-cost inertial correction unit. LOGIR is designed to defeat predominantly small-scale, high-speed surface targets, but because of the limited cost requirements its use for less-contrast ground targets is less effective; it has a weight below 15 kg (33 lb) and a length of 1.9 m (6.2 ft) with range greater than 8 km (5.0 mi).

South Korea's contribution in the LOGIR program are the following:

- Electronics for guidance and control system (production only, design by the USA)
- Electronics for control actuation system (DSP and PWM inverter board)
- Assembly parts for control actuation system (CAS frame and integrated BLDC motor)
- Airframe structure and fins (canard fin, CAS skin, seeker skin)
- Cruciform tail fins and nozzle assembly
- Warhead and fuze attachment improvement

=== U.S. Department of Defense's low-cost rocket procurement program ===
In October 2019, Poniard successfully passed after 10 rockets hit all targets during a Foreign Comparative Testing (FCT) conducted at the Anheung Proving Ground in South Korea under the observation of the U.S. Department of Defense's evaluation team as part of the U.S. military's low-cost rocket procurement program.

The rocket system proved its capability by passing all four tests conducted in South Korea and Key West and San Diego and Hawaii between 2019 and 2024.

== Specifications ==
- Mass: 14 kg (31 lb)
- Length: 1.9 m (6.2 ft)
- Diameter: 70 mm (2.75 in)
- Maximum range: 8 km (5.0 mi)
- Guidance: INS midcourse/Imaging infrared terminal.
- Motor: Existing Hydra 70 motors

== Operators ==
Poniard operators

=== Current operators ===
Saudi Arabia

- Royal Saudi Navy

South Korea

- Republic of Korea Navy
  - Republic of Korea Marine Corps

United Arab Emirates

- United Arab Emirates Navy

== See also ==
- Direct Attack Guided Rocket – (United States)
- Guided Advanced Tactical Rocket - Laser – (United States, Israel)
- Advanced Precision Kill Weapon System – (United States)
- Roketsan Cirit – (Turkey)
