= Guided Advanced Tactical Rocket =

Weapons system from American and Israeli companies

The Guided Advanced Tactical Rocket (GATR) is a weapons system under development by Orbital ATK and Elbit Systems. It is intended to provide a low-cost guided missile compatible with existing unguided 70mm rocket launch platforms such as the Hydra 70. The penetrating version of the GATR is equipped with a steel-cased M282 warhead and a programmable fuze. It can be set from the cockpit to detonate on impact or after a delay and is capable of penetrating a triple-brick wall and light-vehicle armor.

== History ==
In April 2013, ATK was awarded a $3.2 million contract from the U.S. Special Operations Command to provide GATR precision guided missiles for evaluation.

In April 2025, German defense company Diehl Defence announced a partnership with Elbit Systems to pitch the GATR to the German Army under the brand Euro-GATR.

In early August 2025, Elbit Systems placed an order with India based NIBE Limited to manufacture and supply the 70mm-class air-to-surface GATR rockets.

== Specifications ==
- Diameter: 70mm
- Guidance: Semi-active laser homing

== See also ==
- Advanced Precision Kill Weapon System – (United States)
- Direct Attack Guided Rocket – (United States)
- FZ275 LGR – (Belgium)
- Low-Cost Guided Imaging Rocket – (South Korea)
- Roketsan Cirit – (Turkey)
