= Turn Left (disambiguation) =

"Turn Left" is a 2008 episode of the TV series Doctor Who.

Turn Left may also refer to:

- Turn Left (newspaper), now The Cornell Progressive, a student publication at Cornell University
- NASCAR, or the National Association for Stock Car Auto Racing, a motorsport where participants largely turn left.

== See also ==
- Left Turn, a bimonthly activist news magazine
- Linkswende (Left Turn), a Trotskyist group in Austria
