= Forges de Zeebrugge =

Belgian arms manufacturer

- Company type: Société anonyme
- Industry: Aerospace, defence
- Headquarters: Herstal, Belgium
- Area served: Worldwide
- Key people: Alain Quévrin (CEO)
- Products: Rocket system 70mm (2.75"), rocket, rocket launcher, firing control system
- Revenue: €21.7 million (2014)
- Number of employees: 70 (end 2015)
- Parent: Thales Group
- Website: www.fz.be

Forges de Zeebrugge (since 1 January 2017: Thales Belgium) is an arms manufacturer in based in Herstal, Belgium.

Forges de Zeebrugge was founded as a munitions factory between Zeebrugge and Zwankendamme, in the 1930s, as a subsidiary of Carcoke. During World War II, the site was taken over by German forces. Allied bombing, especially in July 1943, devastated the factory site; the original munitions factory was never rebuilt and later remediation of this site was difficult due to unexploded munitions.

The surviving FZ business changed focus to rocketry. In 1971, FZ bought the Fort d'Évegnée from Belgian Army, using it to store explosives.

Modern-day FZ is a subsidiary of Thales, and is a leading manufacturer of aircraft air-to-ground rocket system (70mm, 2.75") including rocket launcher (7, 12 and 19 tube), rockets and firing control system. FZ rocket systems are qualified and in operational use on more than 300 platforms including Airbus Helicopters, AgustaWestland, Hindustan Aeronautics, BAE Systems, Embraer, General Dynamics, Hawker Beechcraft and other aircraft manufacturers. In 2011, FZ workers briefly went on strike, in response to a Belgian government reform of arms exports - which was triggered by FN exporting arms to Libya.

In October 2015, FZ has successfully completed a test firing of its 70 mm laser-guided rocket (FZ275 LGR) from a Denel Rooivalk helicopter. In December 2017, an Airbus Helicopters H145M helicopter successfully launched a 70mm Laser Guided Rockets (FZ275 LGR) during its firing campaign at the Älvdalen test range of the Swedish Defence Materiel Administration Flight test Centre.

== See also ==
- FN Herstal
- Hydra 70
