= The Cornell Progressive =

- Type: Monthly newspaper
- Format: Tabloid, on newsprint
- Owner: Independent
- Founded: 2000
- Ceased publication: Fall 2006
- Political alignment: Liberal/Progressive
- Headquarters: Ithaca, New York, U.S.
- Circulation: 3,000+
- Price: Free

The Cornell Progressive (previously called Turn Left) was an independent student-run publication at Cornell University. Calling itself "Cornell's Liberal Voice," The Cornell Progressive focuses on political and humanitarian issues that it believed were underreported by other media outlets. It also participates in campus dialogs through debates and other events in collaboration with other student organizations.

In a controversial decision, Turn Left was renamed The Cornell Progressive in February 2007. The Cornell Progressive has been inactive since 2016.

== History ==
Founded in 2000 by three engineering students to counter the domination of the independent campus press by the conservative Cornell Review, Turn Left became an influential source for political discussion and debate at Cornell. During the 2004 election, the Turn Left staff generally backed moderate Democrat John Kerry for the presidency over more liberal candidates such as independent Ralph Nader. The publication itself did not endorse a candidate. TL notably avoided a hard line on such hot-button issues as the Israeli–Palestinian conflict.

Turn Left attracted much notice among Cornellians in the spring of 2005 for its scathing attack on The Cornell Daily Sun in response to what it considered poor reporting of major issues on campus, such as the 2005 Student Assembly elections scandal, and a dearth of quality opinion writing. TL also raised its profile with its efforts to expand coverage of local and campus issues, as well as its sometimes biting satire and extensive coverage of international events. Turn Left was the only publication at Cornell that consistently covered the genocide in the Darfur region of Sudan.

In 2005, Turn Left exposed a scandal involving alleged improprieties in the conduct of the leadership of The Cornell Democrats and the Cornell Student Assembly, both led at the time by Tim Lim '06. Lim later removed himself from the presidency of the Democrats in a cloud of controversy, and Cornell students launched a campaign to discredit the allegedly fraudulent March 2005 Student Assembly elections – both events influenced in large part by TL reporting and opinion.

In the Spring of 2007, co-editors Shai Akabas '09 and Ethan Felder '09 launched a successful but controversial campaign to change the name of the publication to The Cornell Progressive. The executive board voted 6-2 to amend the organization's constitution in March 2007.

In 2005, Turn Left began to bill itself as "Cornell's premier political newspaper," signaling its editors' belief that it eclipsed the once monolithic Cornell Review in terms of influence and quality.

=== Milestones ===
- Turn Left premiered in a bounded magazine format in time for Election 2000. All subsequent issues were in newsprint.
- From 2005 to 2007, The Center for American Progress's campus outreach division, Campus Progress, provided Turn Left with a substantial grant. Turn Left was also funded in part by Cornell's Student Assembly and ad revenue.
