= Anti-personnel weapon =

Material designed to kill and injure infantry units

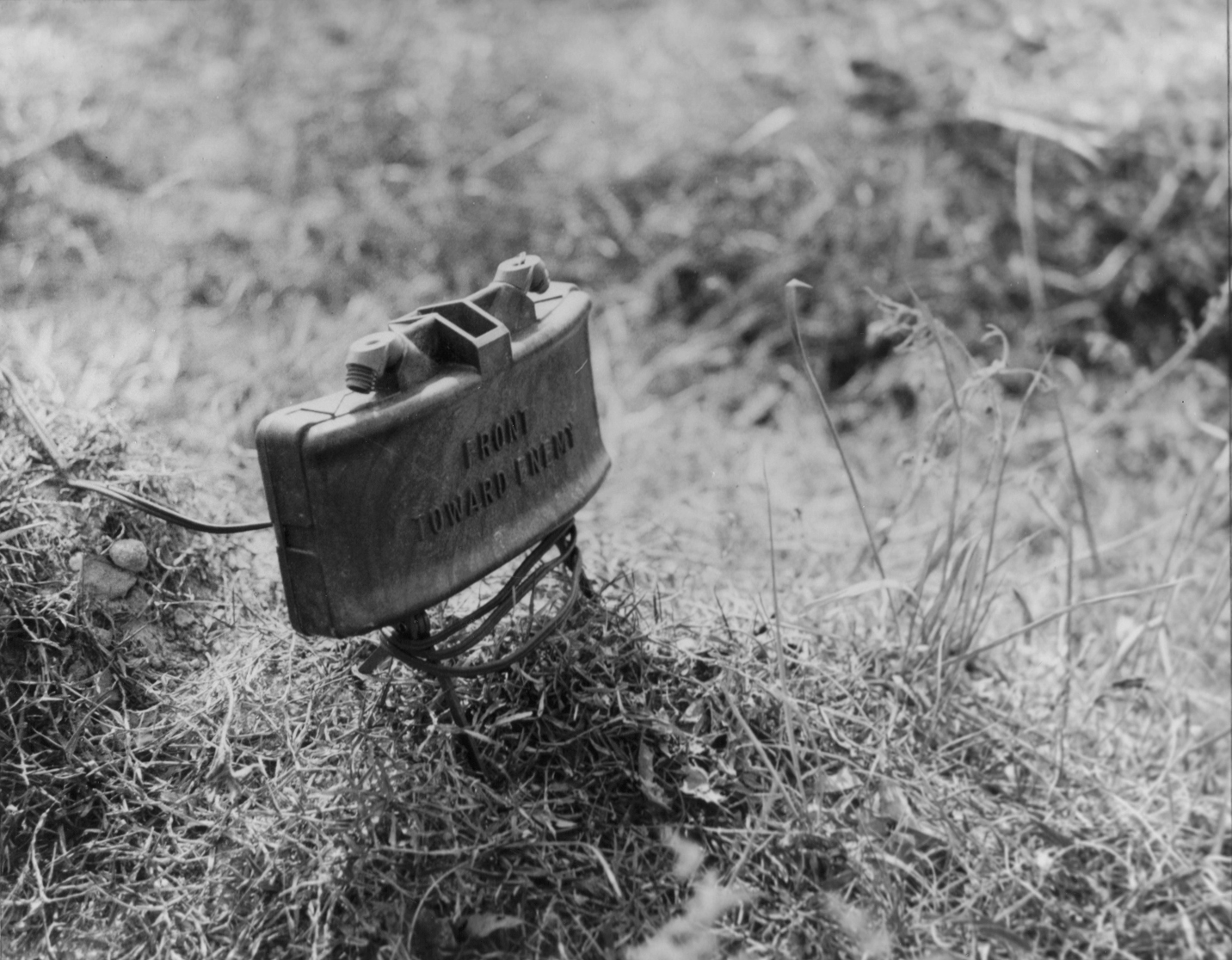
When the US M18 Claymore Anti-Personnel-Mine is detonated, it sends out 700 metal balls traveling at high velocity. These balls can kill or seriously injure any people in the 100-meter blast radius.

An anti-personnel weapon is a weapon primarily used to maim or kill infantry and other personnel not behind armor, as opposed to attacking structures or vehicles, or hunting game. The development of defensive fortification and combat vehicles gave rise to weapons designed specifically to attack them, and thus a need to distinguish between those systems and ones intended to attack people. For instance, an anti-personnel landmine will explode into small and sharp splinters that tear flesh but have little effect on metal surfaces, while anti-tank mines have considerably different design, using much more explosive power to effect damage to armored fighting vehicles, or use explosively formed penetrators to punch through armor plating.

Many modern weapons systems can be employed in different roles. For example, a tank's main gun can fire armor-piercing ammunition in the anti-tank role, high-explosive ammunition in the anti-structure role and fragmentation shells in the anti-personnel role.

There are also more exotic classes of weapons, such as neutron bombs, chemicals, and biological weapons, which are only designed to attack people. As there is a greater international criticism of them, they are therefore rarely used. These are not generally referred to as anti-personnel weapons but by their own names or group terms (e.g., NBC weapons) by which they are specifically banned. Such weapons often create much collateral damage and may affect large numbers of civilians, as well as causing long spanning consequences when they are not detonated in the case of buried explosives.

== Debates ==
A debate has arisen over whether some primarily anti-materiel weapons can be used as anti-personnel weapons. The Barrett M82 rifle, standardized by the U.S. military as the M107, fires a large-caliber .50 BMG round that will penetrate most commercial brick walls and concrete blocks. It is an anti-materiel rifle designated as a Special Application Sniper Rifle and designed for use against military equipment (materiel), rather than against other combatants. It is used by many armies around the world both in regular forces and in special forces units. As it uses a .50 BMG round, this has led to some debates in the U.S. armed forces about the legality of using such a large anti-materiel rifle round against a human. There have been persistent reports that some U.S. military personnel believe that the use of .50 BMG in a direct anti-personnel role is prohibited by the laws of war. However, Maj. Hays Parks states that "No treaty language exists (either generally or specifically) to support a limitation on [the use of .50 BMG] against personnel, and its widespread, longstanding use in this role suggests that such antipersonnel employment is the customary practice of nations."

The Raufoss Mk.211 round

The Raufoss Mk 211 is a .50 caliber (12.7×99mm NATO) multipurpose Anti-materiel rifle projectile produced by Nammo (Nordic Ammunition Group, a Norwegian/Finnish military industry manufacturer of ammunition), under the model name NM140 MP. It is commonly referred to as simply multipurpose or Raufoss, which refers to Nammo's original parent company: Raufoss Ammunisjonsfabrikk (Ammunition Factory) in Raufoss, Norway, established in 1896. The "Mk 211" name comes from the nomenclature "Mk 211 Mod 0" used by the U.S. military for this round.

The multipurpose name is based on the projectile having an armor-piercing (tungsten core), an explosive, and an incendiary component, thus making it capable of penetrating lightly armored targets and causing damage to personnel inside the target after penetration. It is a suitable round for engaging helicopters, aircraft and lightly armored vehicles, as well as unarmored vehicles, and it is capable of igniting jet fuel. The Mk 211 has about the same destructive power as a standard 20mm round against such targets. The Mk 211 is a very popular .50 caliber sniper round used in the Barrett M82 rifle and other .50 BMG rifles. It is also often used in heavy machine guns such as the M2 Browning. Due to its popularity several U.S. arms manufacturers produce the round under license from NAMMO Raufoss AS. There is also a tracer variant, the MK300, used in the Browning heavy machine gun.

There has been much debate over whether the Mk 211 projectile is legal to use against personnel, or if it is strictly anti-materiel ammunition. The International Committee of the Red Cross has sought to have the ammunition banned, due to concern over the incendiary and explosive components and their effect on personnel. Under the St. Petersburg Declaration of 1868 the "military or naval" use of explosive or incendiary projectiles with a mass of under 400 grams is forbidden. Very few nations were parties to the St. Petersburg Declaration, however, and that declaration does not govern the conduct of non-signatory parties. Further, the Hague treaties of 1899 and 1907 – which superseded the St. Petersburg Declaration, and were signed by a far wider circle of nations – do permit the use of such ammunition for auto-cannons and heavy machine guns. Machine guns firing .50 cal/12.7mm ammunition are heavy machine guns. At best, the ICRC's position can be applied to only a small group of nations that were parties to the St. Petersburg Declaration; at worst, the ICRC's position is made moot by more than 100 years of subsequent international treaties.

The official stance of the Norwegian Government is that the 12.7 mm MP round should not be used against personnel, but an exception has been made for snipers using the round — due to the practical limitations of snipers having to change the type of ammunition used when switching between hardened and soft targets. It is being exported strictly in an anti-materiel capacity. Most nations using the round train their soldiers not to deploy the projectile against personnel, but in the heat of battle such regulations are easily overlooked. Also, many parties currently fielding the ammunition have no such regulations, including the U.S., whose policy is that the ammunition is suitable for use against all targets.
