= Laser guidance =

Method of guiding a projectile to a target

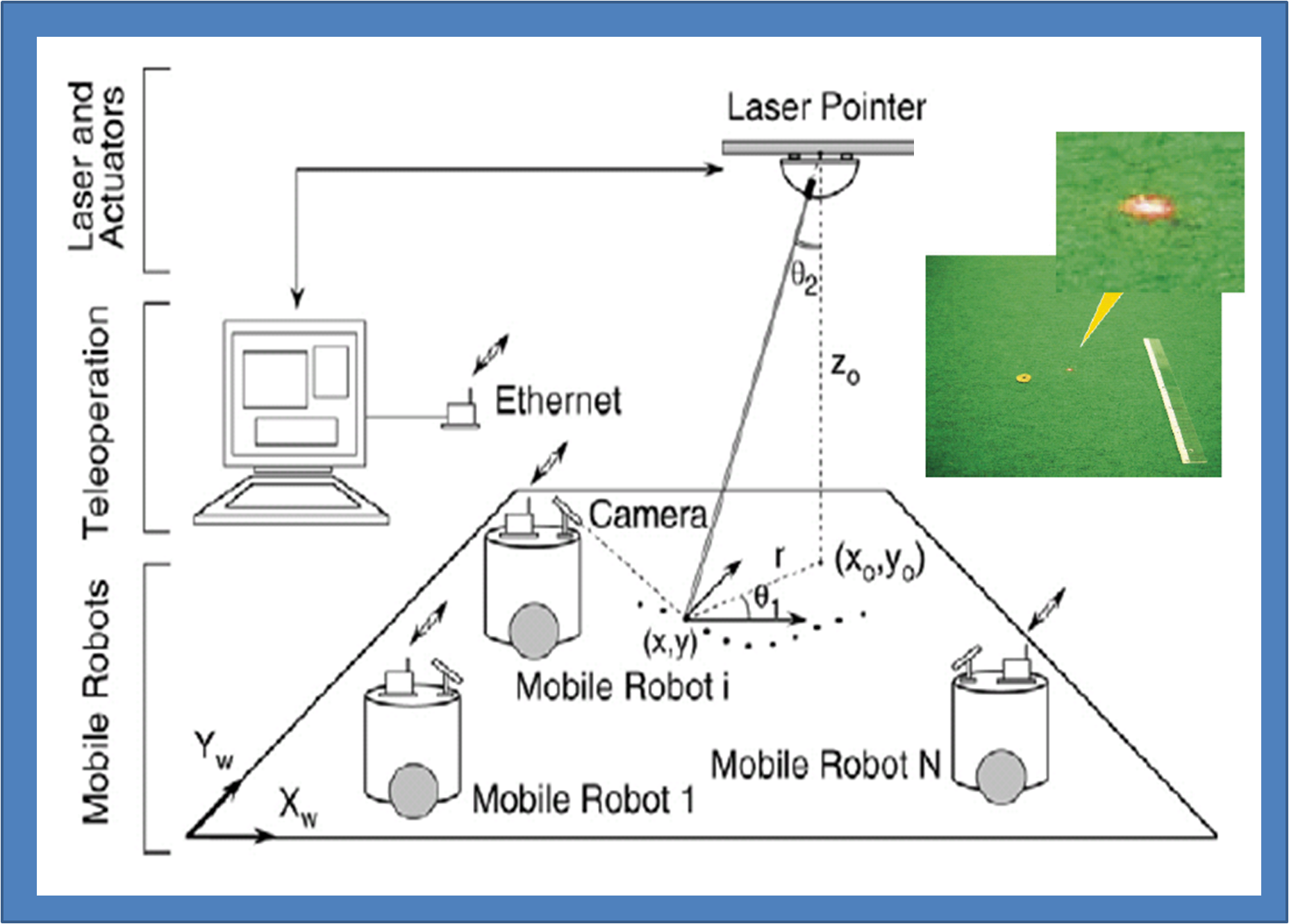
Mobile robot guidance by laser beam (sketch)

Laser guidance directs a robotics system to a target position by means of a laser beam. The laser guidance of a robot is accomplished by projecting a laser light, image processing and communication to improve the accuracy of guidance. The key idea is to show goal positions to the robot by laser light projection instead of communicating them numerically. This intuitive interface simplifies directing the robot while the visual feedback improves the positioning accuracy and allows for implicit localization. The guidance system may serve also as a mediator for cooperative multiple robots. Examples of proof-of-concept experiments of directing a robot by a laser pointer are shown on video. Laser guidance spans areas of robotics, computer vision, user interface, video games, communication and smart home technologies.

== Commercial systems ==
Samsung Electronics Co., Ltd. appears to have used this technology in its robotic vacuum cleaners since 2014 and registered the trademark "PointCleaning" (USPTO serial No. 86555014) in March 2015. Following the grant to Samsung of U.S. Patent No. 9,675,229 and its European counterpart, EP 2963515, both patents were challenged by Igor Paromtchik through an ex parte reexamination in the United States and opposition proceedings in Europe. The European patent was revoked in March 2024. The U.S. patent ceased to be in force in June 2025 due to non-payment of maintenance fees, approximately ten years before the end of its full statutory term.

Google Inc. applied for a patent with USPTO on using visual light or laser beam between devices to represent connections and interactions between them (Appl. No. 13/659,493, Pub. No. 2014/0363168). However, no patent was granted to Google on this application.

== Military use ==
Laser guidance is used by military to guide a missile or other projectile or vehicle to a target by means of a laser beam, either beam riding guidance or semi-active laser homing (SALH). With this technique, a laser is kept pointed at the target and the laser radiation bounces off the target and is scattered in all directions (this is known as "painting the target", or "laser painting"). The missile, bomb, etc. is launched or dropped somewhere near the target. When it is close enough for some of the reflected laser energy from the target to reach it, a laser seeker detects which direction this energy is coming from and adjusts the projectile trajectory towards the source. While the projectile is in the general area and the laser is kept aimed at the target, the projectile should be guided accurately to the target. Countermeasures to laser guidance are laser detection systems, smoke screen, and anti-laser active protection systems.

== See also ==
- Guidance system
- Laser rangefinder
- List of laser articles
- List of laser applications
- Semi-active radar homing
