= AR-1 =

AR1 may refer to

- AR-1 (multiple rocket launcher), a Chinese multiple rocket launcher system
- AR-1 (missile), a Chinese air-to-ground missile
- Aerojet Rocketdyne AR1, a rocket engine
- Alba AR1, an experimental racing car
- Archaerhodopsin-1, a photoreceptor
- Arkansas's 1st congressional district
- Arkansas Highway 1
- ArmaLite AR-1, a bolt-action rifle manufactured by ArmaLite
- IPCC First Assessment Report
- USS Medusa (AR-1), a repair ship of the United States Navy
- Acoustic Research AR-1, an acoustic suspension speaker from Acoustic Research
