= CASC Rainbow =

Chinese unmanned aerial vehicle series

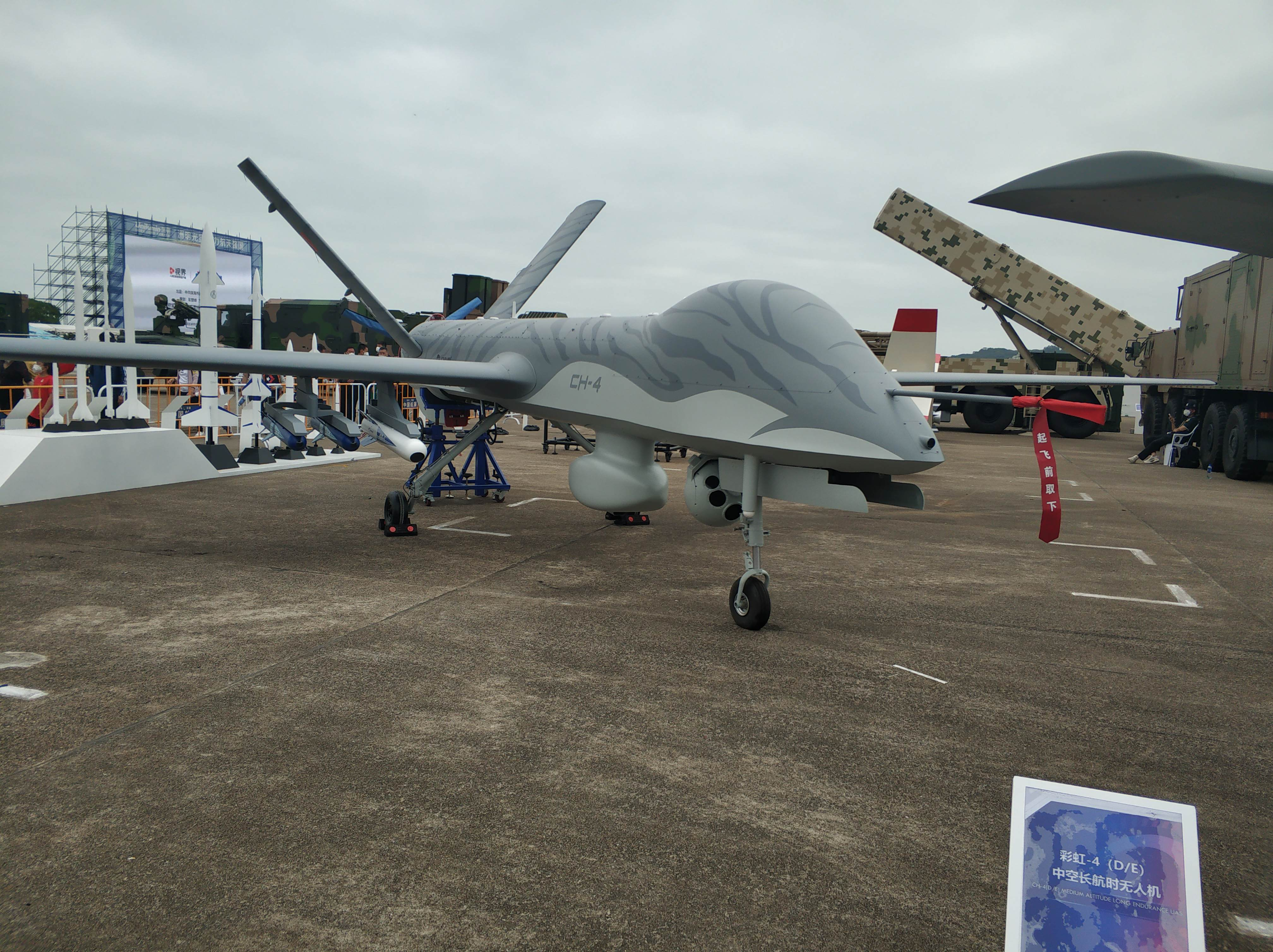
CH-4 at Airshow China Zhuhai 2022

CASC Rainbow (Chinese: 彩虹; pinyin: cǎihóng, abbreviation CH) is a series of unmanned aerial vehicles (UAVs) marketed by China Aerospace Science and Technology Corporation (CASC). The series includes multi-role medium-altitude long-endurance UAVs and micro air vehicles (MAV). The UAVs are produced by CASC's China Academy of Aerospace Aerodynamics (CAAA).

== Series ==
=== CH-1 ===
The CH-1 is a small fixed-wing reconnaissance UAV. Development started in 2000.

=== CH-2 ===
The CH-2 is a small fixed-wing reconnaissance UAV.

=== CH-3 ===
The CH-3 is a fixed-wing unmanned combat aerial vehicle (UCAV). It first flew in 2007. The CH-3 has a 70 kg payload, and can carry the AR-1 air-to-ground missile and FT-9 guided bomb.

The Pakistani NESCOM Burraq may be based on the CH-3; the Burraq is armed with the Burq missile, which may be based on the AR-1.

=== CH-4 ===
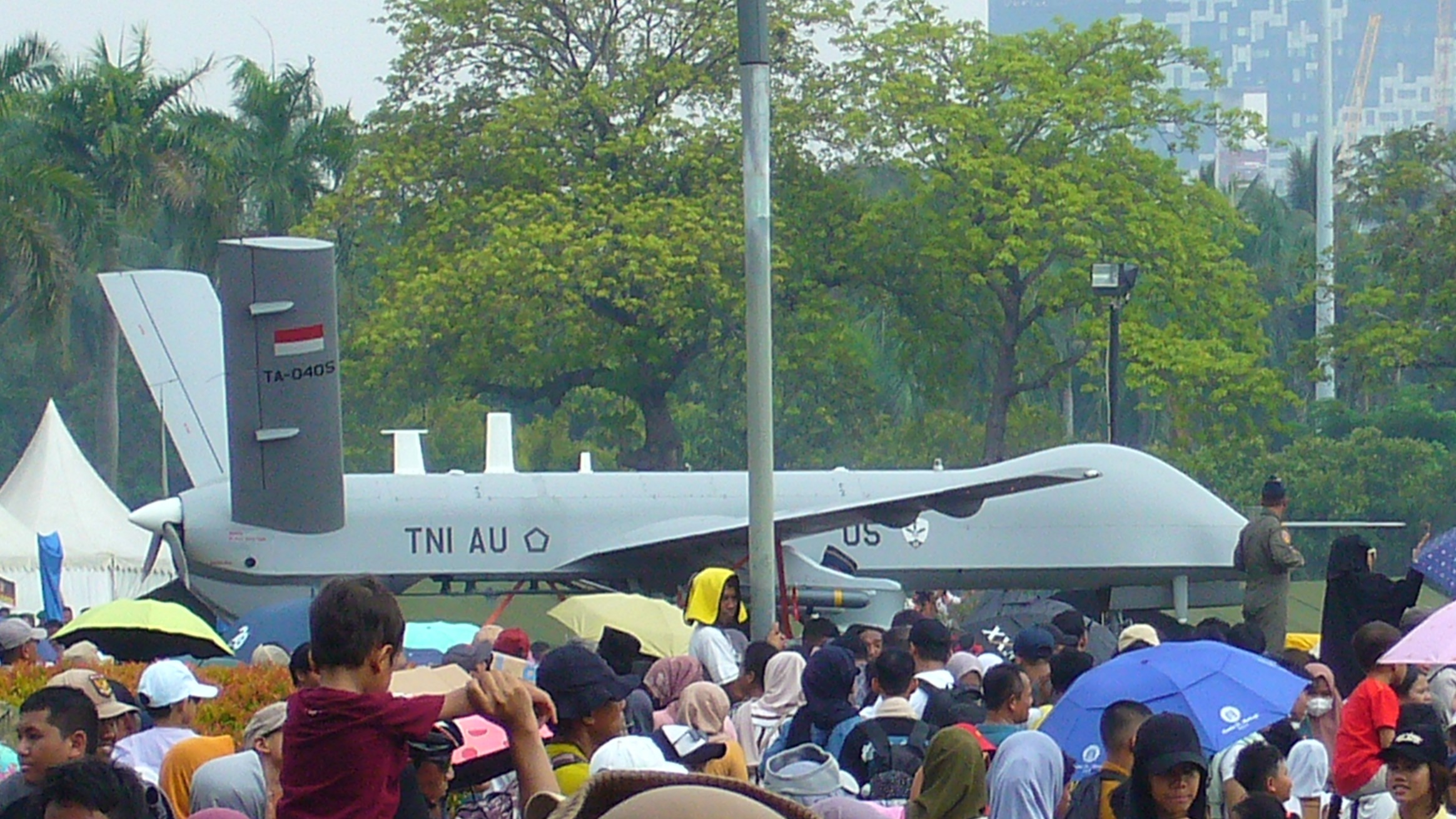
CH-4B of Indonesian Air Force

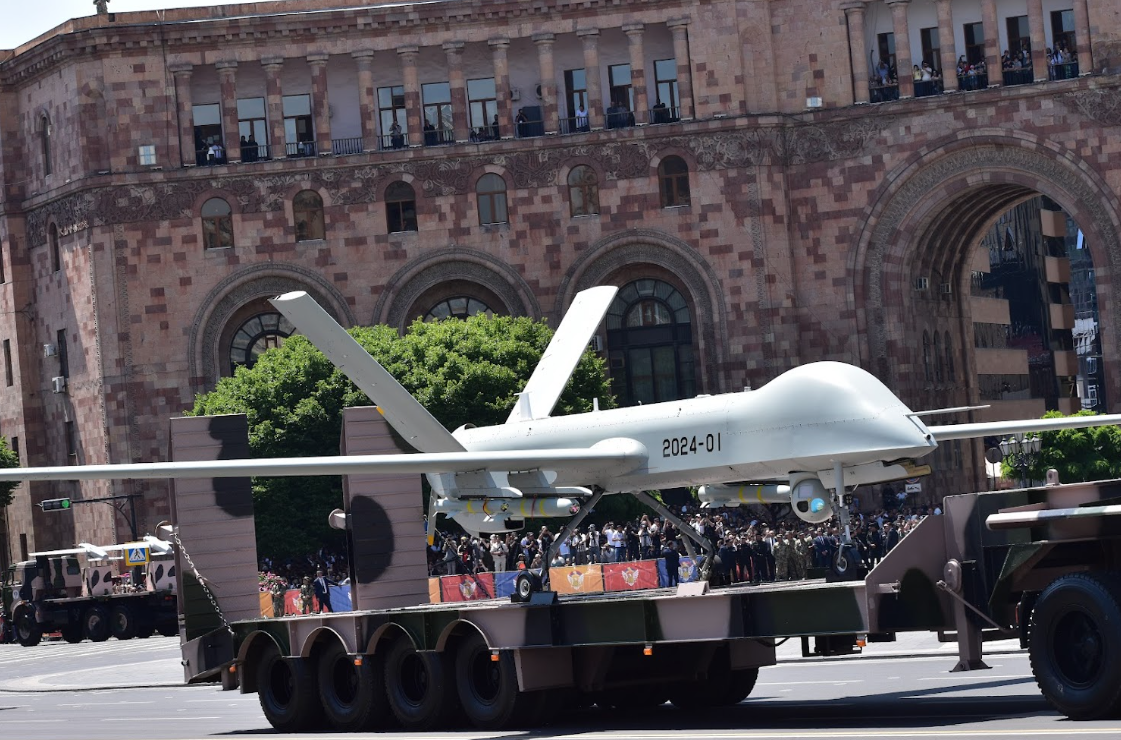
CH-4B of Armenian Air Force

Externally, the CH-4 looks almost identical to the General Atomics MQ-9 Reaper, with the only distinct visual difference between the two UAVs being the ventral fin below the V-tail on MQ-9 which is absent on the CH-4. There are two versions, the CH-4A and CH-4B. The CH-4A is a reconnaissance drone (capable of a 3500–5000 km range and a 30- to 40-hour endurance life) while the CH-4B is a mixed attack and reconnaissance system with provisions for 6 weapons and a payload of up to 250 to 345 kg.

CH-4 is capable of firing air-to-ground missiles from an altitude of 5,000 meters (~16,400 feet), meaning the aircraft is capable of staying outside the effective range of most anti-aircraft guns. It also allows the CH-4 to be able to fire from a position that provides a wider area of view.

A CASC factory in Myanmar produces the CH-4.

Saqr-1 is thought to be mostly influenced by the CH-4.

Specifications:

- Length: 8.5 m (28 ft)
- Wingspan: 18 m (59 ft)
- Maximum takeoff weight: 1,300 kg (2,900 lb)
- Payload: 345 kg (761 lb)
- Endurance: 40 hours
- Powerplant: 1 x 100 horsepower piston engine
- Maximum speed: 235 knots (435 km/h; 270 mph)
- Cruise speed: 180 knots (330 km/h; 210 mph)
- Communications range: >1,000 km (620 mi; 540 nmi) with SatCom (1,500-2,000 km for CH-4B), ~150 km (93 mi; 81 nmi) from Ground Control Station (GCS)
- Armaments: AR-1 missile, AR-2 missile (20 kg, 5 kg armour-piercing warhead, inertial guidance system with terminal semi-active laser (SAL) seeker, maximum range 8 km), AKD-10 air-to-surface anti-tank missile, BRM-1 90mm guided rocket, FT-7 130 kg glide bombs, FT-9/50 50 kg bomb, FT-10/25 25 kg bomb, GB-7/50 50 kg precision-guided munition (PGM), GB-4/100 PGM.

=== CH-5 ===
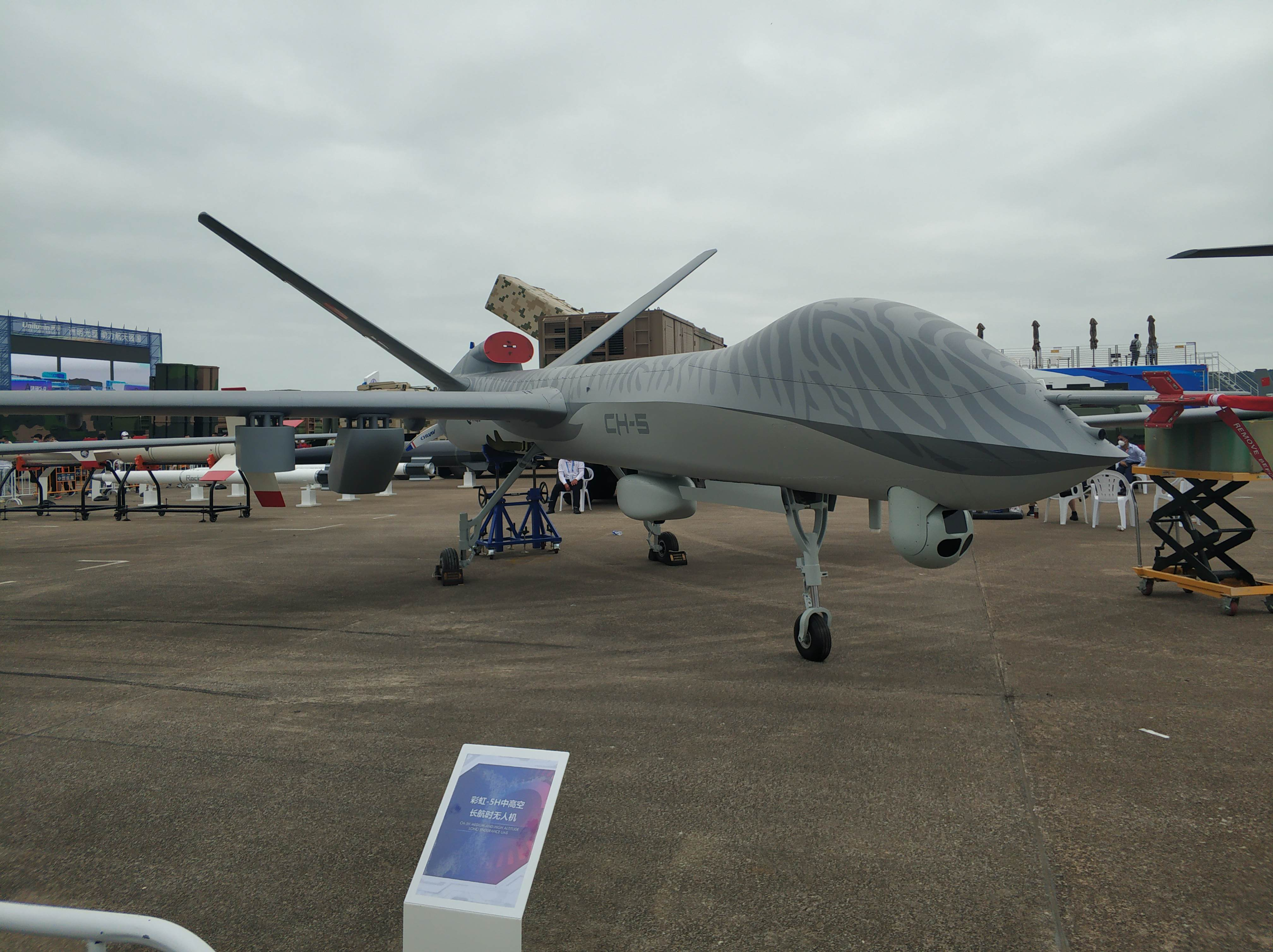
CH-5H at Airshow China Zhuhai 2022

The CH-5 is a large UAV with a wingspan of 21 metres, a payload of 1,000 kg, a maximum takeoff weight of over 3 tonnes, a service ceiling of 9 km, an endurance life of up to 60 hours, and a range of 10,000 km. Thanks to a shared data link system, it can cooperate with CH-3 and CH-4 drones. It conducted its maiden flight in August 2015 at its first airshow flight (in northern Hebei province) in July 2017. The drone can carry a maximum of 16 missiles at a single time. There were also plans to extend its range up to 20,000 km. Chinese officials claimed the CH-5 Rainbow was similar in performance to the US MQ-9 Reaper and "may come in at less than half the price". Compared to the Garrett TPE331 turboprop engine mounted on the Reaper, the CH-5 is equipped with an unidentified turbo-charged piston engine with less than half the horsepower. This design consideration limits the maximum altitude of the CH-5 to 9 km compared to the 12–15 km of the Reaper, but it also extends CH-5's endurance life to 60 hours compared to the Reaper's 14 hours.

A more recent engine variant, with a 300 kW piston engine from Anhui Hangrui Co., will increase the service ceiling to 12 km and the endurance life to 120 hours.

Armaments: AR-1 missile, AR-2 missile (20 kg, 5 kg armour-piercing warhead, inertial guidance system with terminal semi-active laser (SAL) seeker, maximum range 8 km)

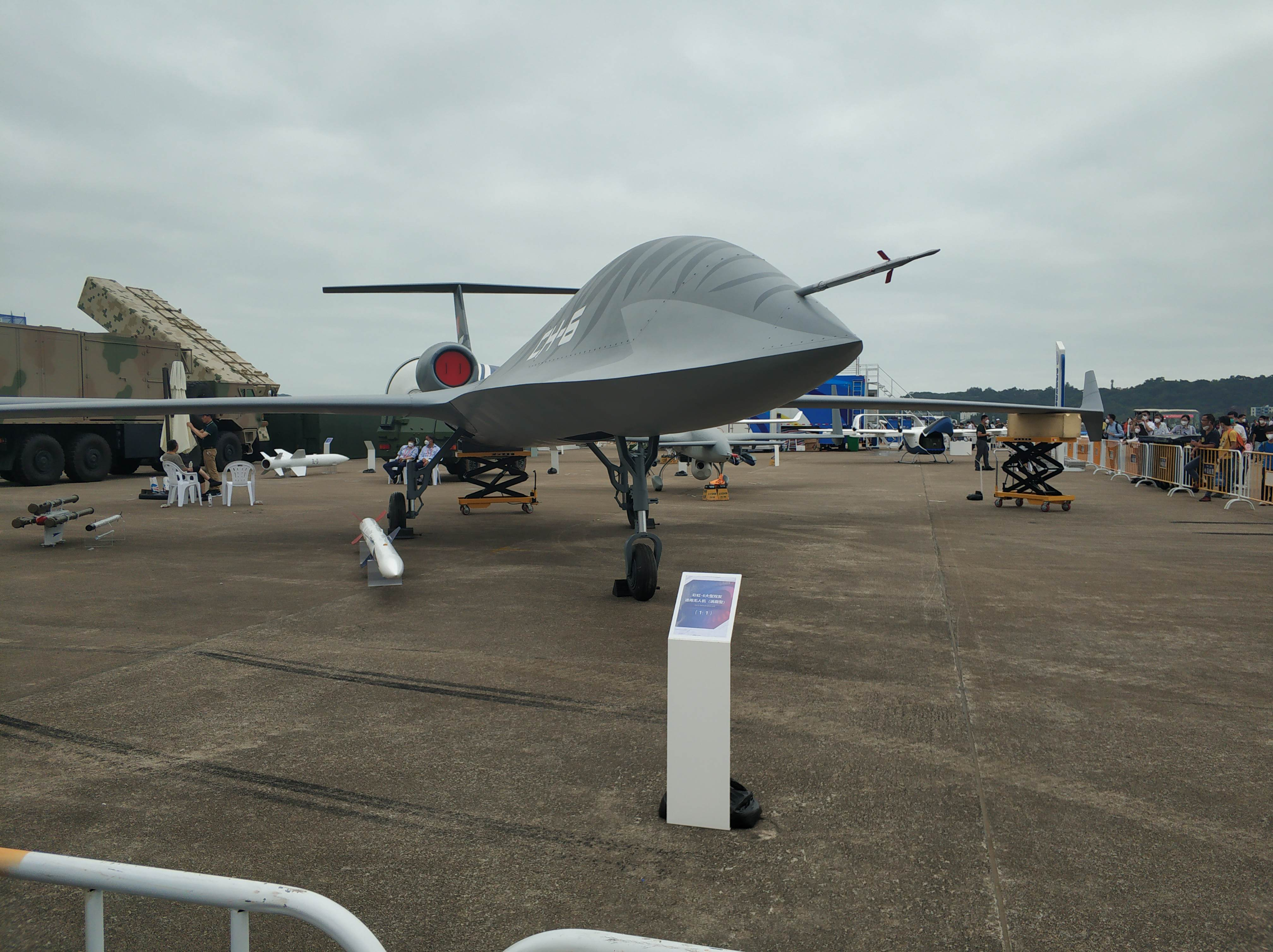
CH-6 at Airshow China Zhuhai 2022

=== CH-6 ===
The CH-6 is a large UAV with a MTOW of 7800 kg with two variants: a strike variant with an 18-hour endurance life and a 450 kg payload; a reconnaissance variant with a 21-hour endurance life and a 120 kg payload. It was in development in 2021.

=== CH-7 ===
The CH-7 is a stealth, flying wing UCAV similar to the X-47B, with a 22m wingspan and a 10m length. It can fly at 920 km/h and an altitude of 13,000 m. The endurance life is around 15 hours with an operational radius of 2,000 km. It can carry anti-radiation missiles and standoff weapons. According to its chief designer, "the CH-7 can intercept radar electronic signals, and simultaneously detect, verify and monitor high-value targets, such as hostile command stations, missile launch sites, and naval vessels". It was planned to make its maiden flight in 2019 and commence production from 2022. A live airframe was spotted in 2024.

=== CH-9 ===
Intelligence, surveillance, reconnaissance, and strike UAV with 11,500 km range.

=== CH-10 ===
The CH-10 is a tiltrotor UAV.

=== CH-91 ===
The CH-91 is a fixed-wing UAV with a twin boom layout and an inverted v-tail with a pair of skids acting as the landing gear. Propulsion is provided by a two-blade propeller driven by a pusher engine mounted at the rear end of the fuselage. The CH-91 is mainly intended for reconnaissance and surveillance missions. It is also known as the BZK-008.

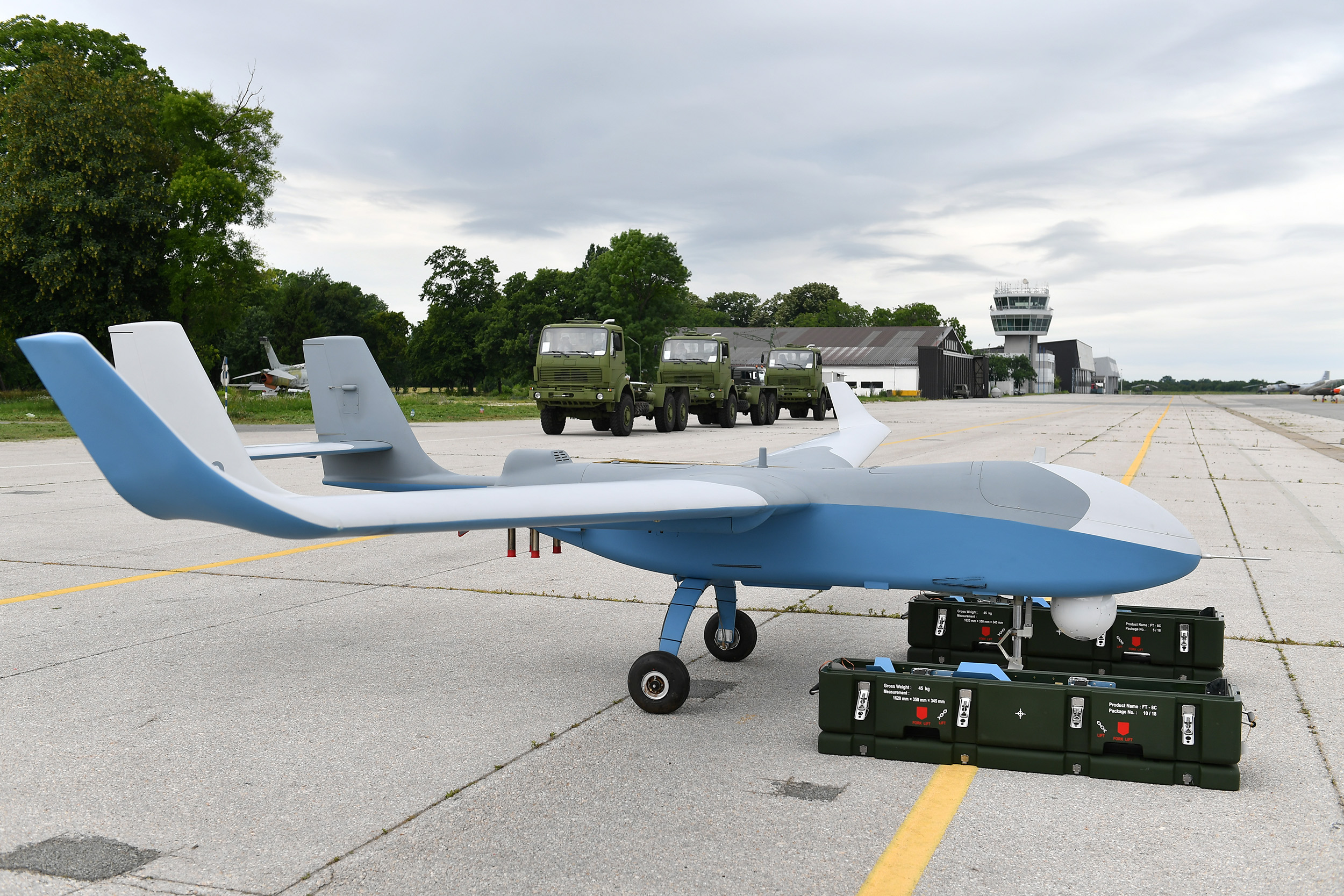
CH-92A of Serbian Air Force and Air Defence

=== CH-92 ===
CH-92 is a fixed-wing UAV in the conventional V-tail layout with a tricycle landing gear. Propulsion is provided by a propeller driven by a pusher engine mounted at the empennage. The CH-92 is mainly intended for reconnaissance, surveillance, and attack missions.

=== CH-95 ===
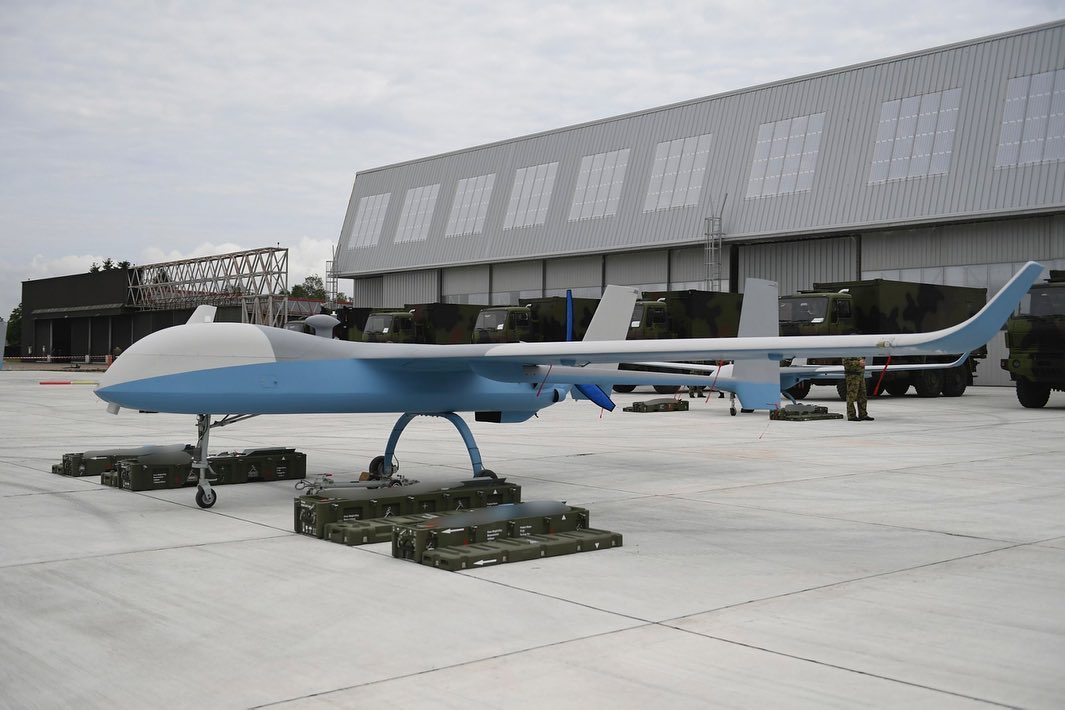
CH-95

CH-95 is a fixed-wing UAV for reconnaissance. It's equipped with a SAR/GMTI radar.

=== CH-802 ===
The CH-802 is a fixed-wing micro air vehicle (MAV) in the conventional layout with an elevated high-wing configuration and V-tail. The CH-802 has a cylindrical fuselage with propulsion being provided by a two-blade propeller driven by a tractor brushless electric motor atop the fuselage. The CH-803 is mainly intended for reconnaissance and surveillance missions. The CH-802 program began in 2007 and was completed in 2008.

Specifications:

- Wingspan (m): 3
- Length (m): 1.8
- Weight (kg): 6.5
- Payload (kg): 1
- Radius (km): 30
- Normal operating altitude (km): 0.3 – 1
- Normal radius (km): 30 – 50
- Cruise speed (km/h): 60
- Endurance (h): 2.5
- Ceiling (km): 4
- Launch: by hand

=== CH-803 ===
The CH-803 is a fixed-wing UAV with a cylindrical fuselage and canards, but without the tailplane. Propulsion is provided by a two-blade propeller driven by a tractor engine mounted in the nose. Another unique feature of the CH-803 is that it adopts a forward-swept wing. The CH-803 is mainly intended for reconnaissance and surveillance missions. The CH-803 program began in 2008 and was completed in 2011.

Specifications:

- Wingspan (m): 3
- Length (m): 1.8
- Weight (kg): 18
- Payload (kg): 3.5
- Radius (km): 30
- Normal operating altitude (km): 0.5 – 1.5
- Normal radius (km): 50 – 80
- Cruise speed (km/h): 80 – 110
- Endurance (h): 5
- Ceiling (km): 3.5
- Launch: catapult
- Recovery: parachute

=== CH-817 ===
VTOL micro-surveillance and attack UAV with a top speed of 64.8 km/h and an endurance of 15 minutes.

=== CH-901 ===
The CH-901 is a fixed-wing UAV in the conventional layout with a cylindrical fuselage and a high-wing configuration. Propulsion is provided by a two-blade propeller driven by a pusher engine mounted at the end of empennage. The CH-901 is designed as a UCAV.

=== CH-902 ===
Fixed-wing cylindrical UAV.

== Operational history ==
Iraq used CH-4s against the Islamic State during the 2013-2017 war.

Nigeria used CH-3s against the Boko Haram insurgency in 2015.

The Tatmadaw in Myanmar reportedly used CH-3s for counterinsurgency in 2015 and 2016 during the Myanmar civil war.

The Saudi-led coalition deployed CH-4s against the Houthi movement during the Yemeni civil war; the aircraft were from Saudi Arabia and the United Arab Emirates. Over twelve Saudi Arabian CH-4s were lost by July 2022.

== Comparison ==
Comparison of major Chinese made military UAVs
| Model | Manufacturer | Armaments | Takeoff weight | Engine type | Maximum cruise speed | Operational endurance |
|---|---|---|---|---|---|---|
| CH-1 | CASC | No | 220 kg | Piston | 140 km/h | 6 hours |
| CH-2 | CASC | No | 220 kg | Piston | 160 km/h | 8 hours |
| CH-3 | CASC | Yes, 80 kg | 650 kg | Piston | 220 km/h | 12 hours |
| CH-4 | CASC | Yes, 345 kg | 1330 kg | Piston | 180 km/h | 30 hours for recon / 12 hours for strike |
| CH-5 | CASC | Yes, 1000 kg | 3300 kg | Turboprop | 220 km/h | 60 hours for recon / 30 hours with 8 AR-1 missiles |
| CH-92 | CASC | Yes, 800 kg | 3300 kg | Piston | 300 km/h | 30 hours with 8 AR-1 missiles |
| CH-95 | CASC | Yes, 800 kg | 3300 kg | Piston | 300 km/h | 30 hours with 8 AR-1 missiles |
| GJ-1 (Wing Loong 1) | Chengdu | Yes, 200 kg | 1100 kg | Piston | 280 km/h | 20 hours |
| GJ-2 (Wing Loong 2) | Chengdu | Yes, 480 kg | 4200 kg | Turboprop | 370 km/h | 32 hours / 20 hours at max speed |
| Wing Loong 3 | Chengdu | Yes, 2300 kg | 6200 kg | Turboprop | Unknown | 40 hours |
| Chengdu WZ-10 | Chengdu | Yes, 400 kg | 3200 kg | Turbofan | 370 km/h | 20 hours |
| WJ-700 | CASIC | Yes | 3500 kg | Turbofan | Unknown | 20 hours |
| WJ-600 A/D | CASIC | Yes | Unknown | Turbofan | 850 km/h | 5 hours |
| TB-001A | Tengdeng | Yes, 1200 kg | 3200 kg | Turboprop | Unknown | 35 hours at 1000 kg payload |

== Operators ==
=== Current ===
Armenia

- Armenian Air Force: CH-4B. During the parade on May 28, 2026, marking Armenia’s Independence Day, three drones of this type were shown. They were equipped with AR-1 and AR-2 air-to-surface missiles.

Algeria

- Algerian Air Force: CH-3 and CH-4

China

- People's Liberation Army Ground Force: 5+ CH-4B (as of 2023); KVD002, a reconnaissance and precision strike drone based on the CH-4.

Democratic Republic of Congo

- Congolese Air Force: 3 CH-4B (as of 2023); nine were ordered.

Ethiopia

- Ethiopian National Defense Force: CH-4

Indonesia

- Indonesian Armed Forces: six CH-4Bs

Iraq

- Iraqi Armed Forces: 12 CH-4 (as of 2023) Deliveries started by 2015. Put into storage in 2017. In 2019, one was "fully mission capable" and the rest were grounded due to maintenance problems. The CH-5 was on order in 2024.

Myanmar

- Myanmar Air Force:CH-3 and CH-4B produce locally by license

Nigeria

- Nigerian Air Force: 1+ CH-3 (as of 2023.) One crashed in January 2015. The UAVs were operated infrequently due to poor quality. In 2020, another eight in delivery.

Pakistan

- Pakistan Air Force: CH-4A
- Pakistan Army Aviation Corps: CH-4B
- Pakistan Naval Air Arm: CH-4B

Saudi Arabia

- Royal Saudi Air Force: CH-4 (as of 2023.)

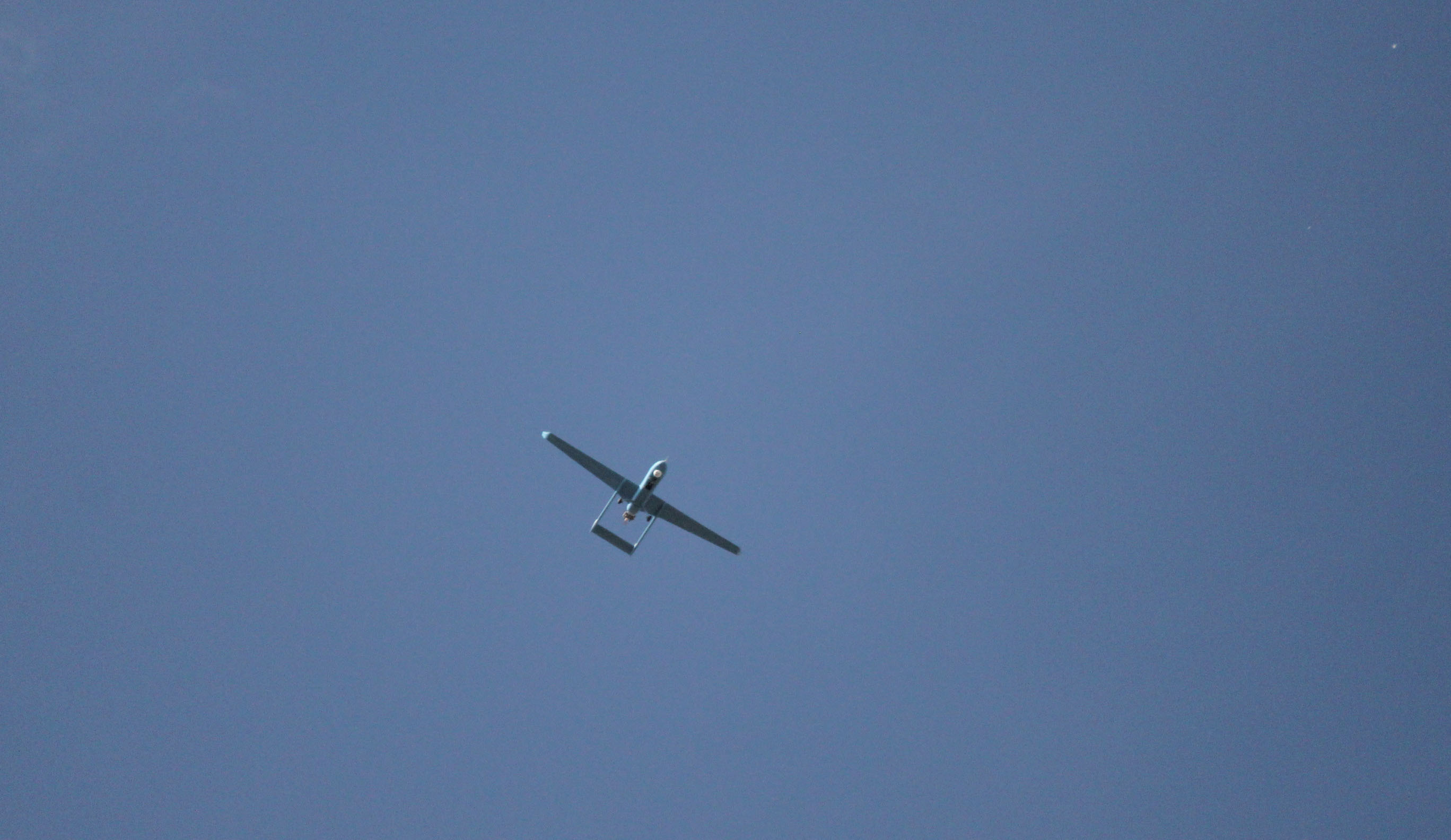
Serbian Air Force and Air Defence CH–92A during Sadejstvo 2020 military exercise.

Serbia

- Serbian Air Force and Air Defence: 6 CH-92A and 10 CH-95

Sudan

- Sudanese Air Force: CH-3 and CH-4

Turkmenistan

- Turkmen Air Force: CH-3A

United Arab Emirates

- United Arab Emirates Armed Forces: CH-4

Zambia

- Zambian Defence Force: CH-4

=== Former ===
Jordan

- Royal Jordanian Air Force: CH-4B (as of 2023.)

== See also ==
- CAIG Wing Loong
- CAIG Wing Loong II
- CAIG Wing Loong-10
- Harbin BZK-005
- Tengden TB-001
- CASIC WJ

Related lists

- List of Chinese aircraft
- List of unmanned aerial vehicles of the People's Republic of China
