= ZTE Engage LT =

- Also known as: Cricket Engage LT (United States)
- Brand: ZTE / Cricket
- Manufacturer: ZTE
- Type: Smartphone
- First released: March 13, 2013
- Predecessor: ZTE Engage
- Compatible networks: CDMA2000 1xRTT, 1xEV-DO Rel. 0, 1xEV-DO Rev. A 800/1700/1900/2100 MHz
- Form factor: Slate
- Dimensions: 121 mm (4.8 in) H 64 mm (2.5 in) W 11 mm (0.43 in) D
- Weight: 144 g (5.1 oz)
- Operating system: Android 4.0.4 "Ice Cream Sandwich"
- System-on-chip: Qualcomm Snapdragon S4 Play (MSM8225)
- CPU: 1.0 GHz dual-core ARM Cortex-A5
- GPU: Adreno 203
- Memory: 1024 MiB RAM
- Storage: 4 GB (3.7 GB user available)
- Removable storage: microSD, microSDHC up to 32 GB
- Battery: 1900 mAh Li-ion (removable)
- Rear camera: 3.1 MP (2048 x 1536 px), LED flash, Video: 720x480 px @ 30 fps
- Front camera: 0.3 MP (640 x 480 px)
- Display: 4.0 in (102 mm) TN-TFT LCD; 480 x 800 pixels (232 ppi)
- Sound: 3.5 mm TRRS, mono speaker
- Connectivity: Wi-Fi 802.11 b/g/n, DLNA, Bluetooth 2.1 + EDR, USB 2.0 (Micro-B), GPS (A-GPS)
- Data inputs: Capacitive touchscreen, multi-touch
- Model: N8000
- SAR: Head: 0.970 W/kg, Body: 1.490 W/kg
- Other: Hearing Aid Compatibility (M4, T3)

The ZTE / Cricket Engage LT is a budget Android smartphone released in March 2013, designed and manufactured by ZTE. It also has pre-installed Cricket platforms and games.

== Specifications ==
=== Hardware ===
The Engage LT is powered by a Qualcomm Snapdragon S4 Play MSM8225 chipset. This hardware configuration includes a 1.0 GHz dual-core CPU and an Adreno 203 graphics processing unit (GPU).

The device features 1 GB of RAM and 4 GB of internal non-volatile memory (with approximately 2 GB available to the user). Storage is expandable via a microSD/microSDHC slot, supporting cards up to 32 GB.

=== Display ===
t utilizes a 4.0-inch TN-TFT LCD capacitive touchscreen with a resolution of 480 x 800 pixels (WVGA), resulting in a pixel density of approximately 232 PPI.

The device weighs 144 grams (5.08 oz) and has dimensions of 121 x 64 x 11 mm.

=== Cameras ===
The device features a single main camera setup consisting of a 3.1-megapixel CMOS sensor capable of capturing still images at 2048 x 1536 pixels. It includes a single LED flash and supports video recording at a maximum resolution of 720 x 480 pixels at 30 frames per second. The lens has a fixed 1.0x optical zoom and lacks autofocus.

The front camera features a 0.3-megapixel (VGA) CMOS sensor for video calls and self-portraits, with a maximum resolution of 640 x 480 pixels.

=== Software ===
The ZTE Engage LT launched with Android 4.0.4 (Ice Cream Sandwich) as its operating system. It includes internal GPS antenna with Assisted GPS (A-GPS) and GLONASS support, alongside an accelerometer and proximity sensor.

==== Platforms ====
- Muve Music
- Google apps
- Cricket My Account, MyBackup and Cricket 411
- NQ Mobile Security

Source from
