= Long March Launch Vehicle Technology =

Chinese aerospace and technology company

Long March Launch Vehicle Technology Co., Ltd.
- Type: Subsidiary
- Industry: Aerospace
- Headquarters: Beijing, China
- Area served: China
- Products: Launch vehicles
- Parent: China Aerospace Science and Technology Corporation

Long March Launch Vehicle Technology Co. Ltd. is an aerospace company under the China Aerospace Science and Technology Corporation. It is based in and mostly run in Beijing.
