= ZTE Grand S =

Android smartphone

- Brand: ZTE
- Manufacturer: ZTE
- Type: Smartphone
- Series: ZTE Grand
- First released: March 2013
- Discontinued: Yes
- Successor: ZTE Grand S II
- Compatible networks: GSM / HSPA / EVDO / LTE
- Form factor: Slate
- Colors: Black; White; Red; Blue; Silver
- Dimensions: 142 mm (5.6 in) H 70 mm (2.8 in) W 6.9 mm (0.27 in) D
- Weight: 110 g (3.9 oz)
- Operating system: Android 4.1 (Jelly Bean)
- System-on-chip: Qualcomm APQ8064 Snapdragon S4 Pro
- CPU: Quad-core 1.7 GHz Krait 200
- GPU: Adreno 320
- Memory: 2 GB RAM
- Storage: 16 GB
- Removable storage: microSDHC (dedicated slot)
- SIM: Mini-SIM
- Battery: Non-removable Li-Ion 1780 mAh
- Rear camera: 13 MP, AF, LED flash, 1080p video recording
- Front camera: 2 MP, 1080p video recording
- Display: 5.0 in (127 mm) IPS LCD, 1080 x 1920 pixels (~441 ppi density)
- Made in: China

The ZTE Grand S is an Android-based touchscreen smartphone manufactured and marketed by ZTE as part of its flagship device lineup. Announced on January 8, 2013, at CES 2013 in Las Vegas and released in March 2013, the phone was noted at launch for its ultra-thin slate design, measuring 6.9 millimeters thick, and its high-density 1080p Full HD display.

This smartphone was released in the United States on October 5, 2013.

== Specifications ==
=== Hardware ===
The ZTE Grand S features a 5.0-inch IPS LCD panel with a resolution of 1080 × 1920 pixels (~441 ppi pixel density), protected by Corning Gorilla Glass. It is powered by a Qualcomm APQ8064 Snapdragon S4 Pro system-on-chip, incorporating a quad-core 1.7 GHz Krait 200 CPU and an Adreno 320 GPU. The device includes 2 GB of RAM and 16 GB of internal storage, which can be expanded via a dedicated microSDHC card slot.

The rear panel houses a 13-megapixel primary camera with autofocus and an LED flash, capable of recording 1080p video. The front-facing camera features a 2-megapixel sensor, also supporting 1080p video capture.

=== Software ===
The smartphone launched running Android 4.1 (Jelly Bean) as its primary operating system. ZTE bundled custom user interface enhancements over the base Android platform to support multi-tasking features, specialized camera controls, and pre-installed multimedia apps.
