= CAAA =

CAAA may refer to:

- Clean Air Act Amendments, a United States law to reduce air pollution
- Crane Army Ammunition Activity, a military facility in Crane, Indiana, United States
- China Academy of Aerospace Aerodynamics, a research organization in Beijing, China
- Somaliland Civil Aviation and Airports Authority, a regulatory body in Somaliland
