= AG-300 =

Chinese air-to-surface missile

The AG-300 is a family of Chinese air-to-ground anti-tank missile developed by China Aerospace Science and Industry Corporation (CASIC), revealed at the Zhuhai Airshow 2016. The missile can be launched from platforms varying from unmanned aerial vehicles (UAV), helicopters, and fighter aircraft. The missile can perform precision strikes against static and moving targets. Three variants were reported, including AG-300/S with a range of 15 km (9.3 mi), AG-300/M with a range of 18 km (11 mi), and AG-300/L with a range of 40 km (25 mi). The missile has been seen mounted on Changhe Z-11WB helicopters and Chengdu Wing Loong-10 drones.

== See also ==
- AKD-10
- AR-1 (missile)
