= China Aerospace International Holdings =

Hong Kong incorporated holding company

- Trade name: CASIL
- Formerly: Conic Investment Co., Ltd.
- Type: public company
- Traded as: SEHK: 31
- Industry: conglomerate; electronic; real estate development
- Predecessor: Chee Yuen Industrial
- Founded: 25 July 1975; 51 years ago
- Founder: Alex Au
- Headquarters: Hung Hom, Kowloon, Hong Kong
Key people
Gong Bo	(non-executive chairman)
Li Hongjun	(president & director)
Jin Xuesheng	(vice-president & director)
- Products: electronic goods; CRT television (discontinued)
- Brands: Contec (discontinued)
- Revenue: ▲HK$3.088 billion (2016)
- Net income: ▼HK$796 million (2016)
- Total assets: ▲HK$12.785 billion (2016)
- Total equity: ▲HK$6.190 billion (2016)
- Parent: China Aerospace Science and Technology Corporation

Chinese name
- Traditional Chinese: 中國航天國際控股有限公司
- Simplified Chinese: 中国航天国际控股有限公司
- Literal meaning: China Aerospace International Holdings Limited Company
Transcriptions
Standard Mandarin
- Hanyu Pinyin: Zhōng guó háng tiān guó jì kòng gǔ yǒu xiàn gōng sī
Yue: Cantonese
- Jyutping: zung1 gwok3 hong4 tin1 gwok3 zai3 hung3 gu2 jau5 haan6 gung1 si1

Chinese short name
- Traditional Chinese: 航天控股
- Simplified Chinese: 航天控股
Transcriptions
Standard Mandarin
- Hanyu Pinyin: háng tiān kòng gǔ
Yue: Cantonese
- Jyutping: hong4 tin1 hung3 gu2

former Chinese name
- Traditional Chinese: 康力投資
- Simplified Chinese: 康力投资
- Literal meaning: Conic Investment
Transcriptions
Standard Mandarin
- Hanyu Pinyin: Kāng lì tóu zī
Yue: Cantonese
- Jyutping: hong1 lik6 tau4 zi1
- Website: casil-group.com

China Aerospace International Holdings Limited (abb. CASIL) is a Hong Kong incorporated holding company. The company itself is a subsidiary of China Aerospace Science and Technology Corporation and a listed company on the Stock Exchange of Hong Kong. It is a red chip company, but not part of the "red chip index" of the stock exchange.

The holding company in the past was involved in electronic goods as well as their plastic components; since acquired by stated-owned China Aerospace Science and Technology Corporation, according to the company, it became a conglomerate that involved in manufacturing and sale of hi-tech products, as well as property investment.

== History ==
=== Conic Investment ===
China Aerospace International Holdings Ltd. was previously known as Conic Investment Co., Ltd. (Chinese: 康力投資有限公司). It was incorporated on 25 July 1975 in British Hong Kong. It was acted as the holding company of Conic Group (Chinese: 康力集團; Jyutping: hong1 lik6 zaap6 tyun4), which including Cony Electronic Products (康力電子製品, incorporated in 1973), Chee Yuen Industrial Company (incorporated in 1969 and was majority owned by Alex Au), Far East United Electronics (incorporated in 1970), Grand Precision Works, Jeckson Electric Company, Hong Yuen Electronics, Soundic Electronics, as well as other electronic and plastic manufacturers. Conic Investment also owned the brand Contec (康藝).

[the larger] Conic Group also had a film production company, Conic Film Productions Limited (康力電影製作有限公司) that was incorporated in October 1979. 康力電影 [sic] signed a contract to publish the album of Sam Hui in 1984. The audio department of the [larger] Conic Group, which publish albums for aforementioned Sam Hui, as well as Michael Kwan and Paula Tsui, was operated by Contec Sound Media Limited (康藝成音有限公司, incorporated in April 1981) according to other news report. The larger Conic Group also had a TV studio called Conic TV Studio, which was now known as Centro TV (先濤電視企業), a predecessor of Centro Digital Pictures. Conic TV was led by Robert Chua and John Chu (朱家欣); Chu later bought the company from [the larger] Conic Group. A sister company, Conic Video Club, was opened in 1982.

In 1980, Conic Investment was already one of the largest electronic manufacturer in Hong Kong. In November 1980, Conic Investment signed a land lease with a government-owned corporation, Hong Kong Industrial Estates Corporation, in order to open a CRT television factory in the Tai Po Industrial Estate. Conic Investment also invested in the mainland China shortly after the reform and opening up, which a Sino-foreign joint venture repairing factory in Fuzhou, for Conic and Contec branded products, was opened in April 1980.

It became a listed company on the Hong Kong stock exchange on 25 August 1981. The listed company received half of the former Conic Group, while some of the former subsidiaries remained private, under another holding company Honic Holdings (雄力集團; hung4 lik6 zaap6 tyun4), which was incorporated on 18 December 1979. Conic TV, Conic Film Productions, Contec Sound Media, Conic Video Club, Grand Precision Works, Soundic Electronics, as well as Conic Semiconductor, etc. were remained private.

In 1983, Conic Investment purchased Conic Investment Building (Note: Known as Sun Hing Commercial and Industrial Building (Chinese: 新興工商業大廈) at that time. Not to be confused with the namesake in Tuen Mun.) from the developer Cheung Kong Holdings, by paying HK$53.3 million cash and issuing new shares worth HK$56.7 million (HK$2.1 per share) to Cheung Kong, that equal to 7.2% of the original share capital according to news report. The building became the headquarter of Conic Investment. In February 1983, Conic Semiconductor, was acquired from Honic, the unlisted portion of the larger Conic Group, for HK$55 million cash. The subsidiary was the largest producer of liquid-crystal display panel in Hong Kong according to the narrative of the company.

However, in 1982, [sic] in order to cover a financial loss, (Note: According to a book, quoting Gerald "Jerry" Garies' narrative, a former manager of the group, the capital increase was a consequence of a financial loss that was reported to the annual board meeting, however, it was contradicted by the narrative of the listed company which presented to the public and the press in the 1983 annual general meeting that the net profit of 1982 financial year was HK$32.6 million, excluding extraordinary items. Nevertheless, an accounting scandal was later discovered by the auditor, regarding 1983 Interim Report which was followed up by the police; under the new board of directors, the annual general meeting approved the 1983 Annual Report on 31 August 1984, which the net loss (excluding extraordinary item) of that year was HK$262.7 million, mainly due to a HK$217 million provision on a bad loan that was lent from Conic to Alex Au controlled Honic and its subsidiaries.) Alex Au (Au Yan Din; 柯俊文; o1 zeon3 man4), chairman and the majority shareholder of Conic Investment at that time, invited Chinese state-owned enterprise (SOE) China Resources to subscribe a capital increase of the company (which an agreement was signed in January 1984 for 100 million number of new shares for HK$1 each), via a subsidiary Sin King Enterprises Company Limited (新瓊企業有限公司), as well as purchase 80 million number of shares from Au. After the completion of the capital increase, China Resources and Bank of China Group (at that time as unincorporated group of companies) became the controlling shareholder in 1984 for 35% ordinary shares via Sin King. (Note: Despite it was reported that Bank of China Group owned 50% joint venture via its member bank and insurance company, according to "1984 Annual Return" of Sin King Enterprises to Hong Kong Companies Registry, the company was owned by Commotra and Feng Ming Investment (豐民投資) in a 50–50 ratio. The former was owned by China Resources and the latter, a company with a licence as a money lender, was owned by various shareholders (13 individuals and 3 companies), according to their filings "Return of Allotments on 14 November 1983" and "1986 Annual Return" to the registry. Those individuals were the managers of the member banks of the Bank of China Group. The largest shareholder of Feng Ming Investment was Mellow Trading Limited for 25% shares. Both Feng Ming and Mellow were headquartered in Bank of China Building, while Sin King was headquartered in China Resources Building. At some time later, Feng Ming Investment formally became a wholly owned direct subsidiary of Bank of China Group Investment Limited, in turn, Bank of China Group Investment Limited was another indirect wholly owned subsidiary of Bank of China; Bank of China Group Investment Limited was incorporated on 11 December 1984 as China Development Investment (Hong Kong) (renamed in 1993).) Conic at that time declared that the company did not faced any difficulties, thus the takeover was not related to the situation of the company. However, Alex Au and 5 other directors were resigned and replaced by directors that were nominated by Sin King shortly after the takeover. A scandal that involves false accounting as well as illegal withdrew of the capital of the listed company was also reveal in 1984–85, with 2 of the resigned directors Tam Chun Shing (譚頌聲) and Lam Chun Kiu (林中翹), as well as 7 managers were arrested. It was also reported that Alex Au was fled to Taiwan in 1984, who refused to refurbish the loan of Honic from Conic. Au also involved in a kidnapping crime in 1985 which he was reportedly kidnapped his new business partner. Lam Chun Kiu later also founded his own electronics company, including a joint venture that now known as Konka Group (康佳集团).

Since then, Conic Investment was shifted its focus to the mainland China under the new owner. Sin King also attempted to privatise and delist the company in 1987. However, the plan was abandoned in the same year. It was revealed that the company had a heavy net loss in 1986 financial year.

=== China Aerospace International Holdings ===
In 1993 Conic Investment was acquired by fellow SOE China Aerospace Science and Technology Corporation (CASC) as a backdoor listing, renaming to China Aerospace International Holdings Limited (航天科技國際集團有限公司). The English name of the company was remained unchanged since 1993, but the Chinese name had changed to the current one in 2008. Some of the subsidiaries of former Conic Investment remained intact as live subsidiaries, although the economic transformation of Hong Kong had made most of the factories of the group were shifted to mainland China.

The company was headed by Lt. Col. Liu Chaoying in the late 1990s, the daughter of Liu Huaqing.

In 2000, the Stock Exchange of Hong Kong publicly criticised four (former) directors of CASIL for not disclosing related-parties deals of CASIL and CASC properly, as well as disclosing the deals with XCOM Multimedia Communications, a company that owned a stake in CASIL's joint venture CXSAT. XCOM Multimedia Communications and CXSAT were makers of digital satellite receiver decoder.

In 2005, the company sold the former headquarter Conic Investment Building which was located in Hung Hom to Global Coin Limited, a subsidiary Cheung Kong Holdings, for HK$330 million.

The company also owned 14.29% shares of APT Satellite International (via a subsidiary CASIL Satellite), the parent company of listed company APT Satellite Holdings, the operator Apstar satellites. CASIL Satellite was sold to CASIL's parent company CASC in 2011 for HK$132.3 million.

In 2014, Li Guolei, a director of CASIL's subsidiary China Aerospace Industrial Limited, committed suicide by jumping off from China Aerospace Centre, Kwun Tong. According to his wife, he was under investigation for corruption by mainland Chinese authorities.

CASIL had a joint venture, Hainan Aerospace Investment Management (海南航天投资管理), which was a developer of the complex zone of Wenchang Spacecraft Launch Site. However, the joint venture withdrew from the development in 2016. It was reported the complex would be developed into a theme park.

== Subsidiaries ==
As of 31 December 2016

current

- CASIL Semiconductor (航天科技半導體); formerly known as Conic Semiconductor (康力半導體) (100%)
- CASIL Electronic Products (航天科技電子製品); formerly known as Cony Electronic Products (康力電子製品) (100%)
- Chee Yuen Industrial Company (志源實業) (100%)
- Jeckson Electric Company (志順電業) (100%)
- Jeckson Electronics Company (志順電子), formerly known as Far East United Electronics (聯華電子廠) (100%)
- Hong Yuen Electronics (康源電子廠) (100%)

former

- CASIL Satellite (100%)
- CASIL Telecommunications

former, Conic era

- Bony Electronics (100%) (邦力電子), dissolved
- Contec Electronics, Inc. (80%) incorporated in the United States
- Hop Cheong Plastic Manufactory (100%) (合昌塑膠製品廠), dissolved
- Hung Nien Electronics (100%) (鴻年電子), dissolved
- Jecko Electronics (100%) (志豪電子廠 or 志豪電業), dissolved
- Jeckwell Electronics (100%) (志威電子業製品), dissolved

== Joint ventures ==
former

- Xiamen Overseas Chinese Electronic Company (厦门华侨电子) (50%)

== Shareholders ==
As of 31 December 2016

Rank	Name	Percentage	Footnotes
1	China Aerospace Science and Technology Corporation	38.37%	state-owned enterprise, supervised by the Central Government; owned via Jetcote Investments Limited, Burhill Company Limited and; Sin King Enterprises Company Limited

== See also ==
- China Healthcare Enterprise Group, former known as Telefield International (Holdings), a former electronic company that was founded by a former employee of Conic Investment, Cheng Han Ngok (Steve Cheng; 鄭衡嶽)
- APT Satellite Holdings, sister company in Hong Kong
- China Energine, sister company in Hong Kong
