= Saqr (drone) =

Unmanned aerial vehicles in Saudi Arabia

General information
- Type: Unmanned aerial vehicle (UAV)
- National origin: Saudi Arabia
- Manufacturer: King Abdulaziz City for Science and Technology
- Status: In service
- Primary user: Saudi Arabian Army
- Number built: 300+

History
- First flight: 2012

Saqr (Arabic: صقر, meaning "Falcon") is a series of unmanned aerial vehicles (UAVs) developed and produced by the King Abdulaziz City for Science and Technology (KACST) for the government of Saudi Arabia. First developed in 2012, the Saqr program includes reconnaissance, surveillance and combat-capable medium-altitude long-endurance (MALE) models.

== Overview and Development ==
The Saqr program was initiated by KACST to establish an indigenous domestic manufacturing capability for unmanned aircraft systems in Saudi Arabia. Development began in 2012, and by August 2014, a total of 38 units across multiple variants had been constructed.

The aircraft are manufactured using lightweight carbon fiber and fiberglass composite material. The use of composite materials reduces the radar cross-section of the airframes, providing low-observable (stealth) characteristics, while optimizing fuel efficiency and payload capacity.

Early variants were deployed primarily for aerial research, environmental monitoring and intelligence, surveillance and reconnaissance (ISR) missions equipped with high-resolution cameras. Subsequent iterations, specifically the Saqr-1, were upgraded to support combat missions and satellite-linked long-range capabilities..

== Technical Specifications and Capabilities ==
=== Performance ===
According to statements from Prince Turki bin Saud bin Mohammed Al Saud (then vice president of KACST), the advanced Saqr-1 possesses significant operational upgrades over its predecessor tactical models:

- Operational Altitude: Average cruising altitude of 20,000 feet (6,100 m).
- Endurance: Capable of remaining airborne for over 24 hours.
- Range: Operational range exceeding 2,500 kilometers (1,600 mi).
- Avionics & Connectivity: Equipped with a Ka band satellite communications (SATCOM) system, allowing beyond-line-of-sight (BLOS) command and control over long distances.

=== Armaments ===
Combat-configured variants of the Saqr (notably the Saqr-1) are capable of carrying precision-guided munitions, including:

- AR-1: Chinese-built laser-guidped Anti-Tank missile.
- FT-9: Satellite/laser-guided precision bomb.

== Variants ==
- Saqr-1: A medium-altitude long-endurance (MALE) unmanned combat aerial vehicle (UCAV) featuring satellite communications, long endurance, and precision strike capacity.
- Saqr-2: A medium-range tactical reconnaissance UAV designed for ISR operations.
- Saqr-3: A short-range tactical lightweight UAV constructed for localized surveillance and aerial photography.
- Saqr-4: A tactical hand-launched or small catapult-launched reconnaissance UAV.

== Operational History ==
As of August 2014, 38 units across all configurations had been built by KACST for use by Saudi defense and security agencies.

== See Also ==
- King Abdulaziz City for Science and Technology
- Saudi Arabian Armed Forces
- CASC Rainbow
- General Atomics MQ-9 Reaper

== Sources ==
- ""Science & Technology "Produces (38) Drones Characterized by Lightweight, Durability and Being Radar undetectable" (Press release). King Abdulaziz City for Science and Technology.
