= AR-1 (missile) =

Chinese air-to-ground missile

The Archer (AR; Chinese: 射手) is a series of Chinese air-to-ground anti-tank missile developed by China Aerospace Science and Technology Corporation (CASC). Guided via the semi-active laser, it can be carried by unmanned aerial vehicles (UAVs), helicopters, and fixed-wing aircraft. It can provide precision attacks on static and slow-moving targets. Overall, the AR-1 missile is comparable to the AKD-10, another Chinese missile.

The weapon was originally designed for the CASC Rainbow series UAVs, and was later expanded into lighter and heavier variants, as well as multiple types of loitering munitions.

== AR-1 ==
The AR-1 was the first missile type in the series. The AR-1 was developed by the 11th Academy of the China Aerospace Science and Technology Corporation (CASC) for equipping the CASC CH-3 and CASC CH-4 drones, with development commenced in August 2006. Unlike other drone-carried missiles in the world, AR-1 was designed specifically for an unmanned aerial vehicle, with highly integrated manoeuvre, fire control, and sensor systems. The AR-1 development test was successfully concluded in October 2011.

The AR-1 weighs around 40 kg (88 lb) and is guided by inertial navigation system and semi-active laser homing. The seeker head is modular and can be replaced with other types. Other variants of AR-1 include AR-1A missile with a heavier warhead and a smokeless motor, AR-1C missile with all-weather capable infrared homing, AR-1D with television (TV) guidance, AR-1E missile with millimeter-wave radar seeker, and the AR-1L missile with tandem-charge HEAT warhead.

The Pakistan Barq missile may be based on the AR-1.

== AR-2 ==
The AR-2 is a lightweight version of the AR-1. The AR-2 can be quadpacked into a single hardpoint that carries the AR-1, thus improving the magazine depth. It weighs around 20 kg (44 lb).

== AR-4 ==
The AR-4 is an enlarged version of the AR-1. The AR-4 weighs around 80 kg (180 lb) and fits a 40 kg (88 lb) blast fragmentation/penetration warhead to target heavily armored vehicles and fortified structures. It has a range of 20 km (12 mi) and a launch altitude of 7,000 m (23,000 ft). The missile features a modular seeker design, coming with interchangeable infrared, television, and millimeter-wave radar seekers.

== AR-3 ==
The AR-3 is a loitering munition based on the AR series missiles. The munition weighs 100 kg (220 lb) and is powered by a miniature turbojet engine that provides a loitering time of 30 minutes.

== Specifications ==
Missile specifications
	AR-1	AR-2
Launch mass	42 kg (93 lb)	15 kg (33 lb)
Warhead	9 kg (20 lb)	4.2 kg (9.3 lb)
Length	1,400 mm (4.6 ft)	1,180 mm (3.87 ft)
Diameter	175 mm (6.9 in)	130 mm (5.1 in)
Span	370 mm (15 in)	330 mm (13 in)
Range	2–8 km (1.2–5.0 mi; 1.1–4.3 nmi)	1.5–8 km (0.93–4.97 mi; 0.81–4.32 nmi)
Maximum speed	Mach 1.1	Mach 0.7
Release altitude	500–5,000 m (1,600–16,400 ft)	500–5,000 m (1,600–16,400 ft)
Release speed	180–250 km/h (97–135 kn)	180–250 km/h (97–135 kn)
Warhead	Penetration blast warhead / Fragmentation-blast warhead	Fragmentation-blast warhead
Guidance	INS (LOBL/LOAL) + SAL / infrared homing / Television (TV) / mmW radar	
Steering	Double cruciform trailing edges (X-X)	
Accuracy (CEP)	≤1.5m	≤1.5m

== See also ==
- AKD-10
- AG-300
