= China Energine =

Hong Kong–based holding company

China Energine International (Holdings) Limited
- Native name: 中國航天萬源
- Formerly: CASIL Telecommunications Holdings Limited
- Company type: Public
- Traded as: SEHK: 1185
- Industry: Energy
- Headquarters: Hong Kong
- Products: Wind power plant
- Services: Electricity supply
Owner
- Chinese Government
- (via CASC)
(60.64%)
Parent
| Astrotech Group | (direct) |
| CALT | (intermediate) |
| CASC | (intermediate) |
| The SASAC | (intermediate) |
| The State Council | (ultimate) |
- Subsidiaries: Castel

Chinese name
- Traditional Chinese: 中國航天萬源國際（集團）有限公司
- Simplified Chinese: 中国航天万源国际（集团）有限公司
- Literal meaning: China Aerospace Ten Thousand Source International (Group) Co., Ltd.
Transcriptions

China Energine
- Traditional Chinese: 中國航天萬源
- Simplified Chinese: 中国航天万源
- Literal meaning: China Aerospace Ten Thousand Source
Transcriptions

Second alternative Chinese name
- Traditional Chinese: 萬源國際
- Simplified Chinese: 万源国际
- Literal meaning: Ten Thousand Source International
Transcriptions
Standard Mandarin
- Hanyu Pinyin: Wànyuán Guójì

CASIL Telecommunications Holdings Limited
- Traditional Chinese: 航天科技通訊有限公司
- Simplified Chinese: 航天科技通讯有限公司
Transcriptions
Standard Mandarin
- Hanyu Pinyin: Hángtiān kējì tōngxùn yǒuxiàn gōngsī
- Website: energine.hk

China Energine International (Holdings) Limited, or China Energine, is a Hong Kong–based and Cayman Islands-incorporated holding company. The controlling shareholder was Chinese state-owned mega-conglomerate China Aerospace Science and Technology Corporation (CASC). The company was formerly known as CASIL Telecommunications Holdings Limited; CASIL was an acronym of China Aerospace International Holdings Limited, a listed subsidiary of CASC.

Both China Energine and CASIL were red chip companies. China Energine became a listed company on 11 August 1997. On 30 June 2016, it had a market capitalization of HK$2.752 billion.

China Energine engages in wind power and telecommunication equipment manufacturing business.

== History ==
CASIL Telecommunications Holdings Limited (Chinese: 航天科技通訊有限公司, "CASIL Telecom" or "Castel" in short) was spin-off from China Aerospace International Holdings Limited (CASIL) in 1997. CASIL was a subsidiary of China Aerospace Science and Technology Corporation (CASC). As of 31 December 2007, CASC, via China Academy of Launch Vehicle Technology and its BVI subsidiary, "Astrotech Group Limited", owned 73.10% shares of the listed company. In 2008, the wind power business was injected to the listed company, as well as renaming the company to China Energine International (Holdings) Limited. The brand Castel was retained by the Hong Kong-incorporated subsidiary "China Aerospace Telecommunications Limited" (Chinese: 中國航天科技通信有限公司).

The company had caused a controversy by not removing Au-yeung Keung as the company secretary (a position in a listed company that was regulated) in 2016, despite his accountancy registration has been suspended for three years in 2016.

== Name ==
The English name, Energine, was a phase that combined energy and engine; the Chinese name (Chinese: 萬源), combined the Chinese character for 10,000 (Chinese: 萬) and [energy] source (Chinese: 源).

The slogan of the company was "from engine to new energy".

== Shareholders ==
As of 31 December 2016, China Energine major shareholder was Astrotech Group Limited for 60.64%, which was a subsidiary of China Academy of Launch Vehicle Technology, in turn a wholly owned subsidiary of China Aerospace Science and Technology Corporation, in turn a wholly owned subsidiary of the State-owned Assets Supervision and Administration Commission of the State Council. As the company was incorporated outside mainland China but controlled by the Chinese Government, the company is a red chip company.

== See also ==
- APT Satellite Holdings, sister company in Hong Kong
- China Aerospace International Holdings, sister company in Hong Kong
