= China Academy of Aerospace Electronics Technology =

Research institute in China

The China Academy of Aerospace Electronics Technology (Chinese: 中国航天电子技术研究所) is a research institute affiliated with the China Aerospace Science and Technology Corporation. It was founded in 1965. It is an indirect shareholder of listed company ZTE (via ZTE Holdings) as well as the largest shareholder of China Aerospace Times Electronics (SSE: 600879), the second largest shareholder of Shaanxi Aerospace Power Hi-Tech (SSE: 600343).
