= ZTE Axon 7 =

Flagship smartphone manufactured by ZTE

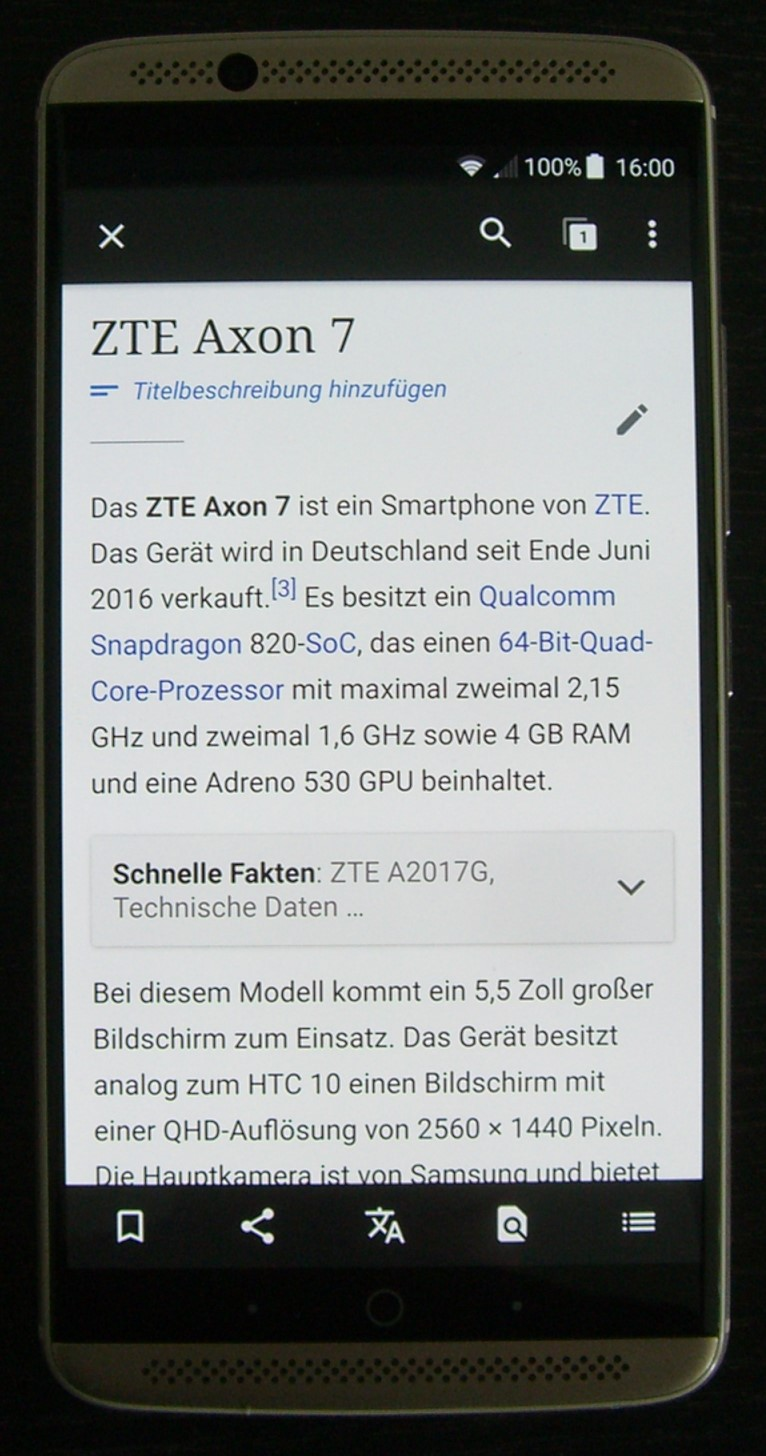
- Brand: ZTE
- Manufacturer: ZTE
- Type: Smartphone
- Series: Axon
- First released: May 25, 2016
- Availability by region: June 2016
- Predecessor: ZTE Axon
- Successor: ZTE Axon 9 Pro
- Related: ZTE Axon 7 mini ZTE Axon 7 Max; ZTE Axon 7s
- Compatible networks: GSM: 850/900/1800/1900 MHz; HSDPA: 850/900/1900/2100 MHz; LTE: 800/850/900/1800/2100/2600 MHz
- Form factor: Slate
- Colors: Ion Gold, Quartz Grey, Chromium Silver
- Dimensions: 151.7×75×7.9 mm (5.97×2.95×0.31 in)
- Weight: 175 g (6 oz)
- Operating system: Android 6.0 with MiFavor 4.0 UI
- System-on-chip: Qualcomm Snapdragon 820
- CPU: Quad-core (2x 2.15 GHz Kryo & 2x 1.6 GHz Kryo)
- GPU: Adreno 530
- Memory: 4/6 GB RAM
- Storage: 64/128 GB
- Battery: Li-Ion 3250 mAh
- Charging: USB Type-C 3.0; Quick Charge 3.0 support, up to 18W
- Rear camera: 20 MP, PDAF + instant autofocus, OIS, f/1.8
- Front camera: 8 MP, f/2.2, facial beauty enhancement system
- Display: 5.5" (1440 x 2560), AMOLED, 16:9, 538 ppi
- External display: none
- Connectivity: Wi-Fi (802.11 a/b/g/n/ac); Bluetooth 4.0 (A2DP, EDR, LE); DLNA; NFC; USB-C
- Data inputs: multi-touch touchscreen
- Other: accelerometer gyroscope proximity sensor Dolby Atmos Surround Sound, Fingerprint 3.0

The ZTE Axon 7 is a smartphone manufactured by ZTE as a flagship, announced on May 26, 2016, and officially launched in June of the same year. The Axon 7 had the same specifications as the Samsung Galaxy S7, but cost less.

== Specifications ==
=== Hardware & design ===
The back and frame is made of aluminum. It was available in 3 color options: Ion Gold, Quartz Grey, and Chromium Silver. In the front, it features an AMOLED display sizing at 5.5 inches, with a resolution of 1440 × 2560 px. It was protected with Corning Gorilla Glass 4 protector.

The Axon 7 is powered by the Qualcomm Snapdragon 820 chipset with 8 Kryo processors and the Adreno 530 graphics processor. The battery is li-ion, with capacity of 3250 mAh and also supports 18W Quick Charge 3.0 fast charging.

The main camera features a single 20MP main lens (f/1.8) with PDAF, and the front camera features an 8MP (f/2.2) lens. In the main camera, it can record up to 720p @ 240fps, 1080p @ 30fps/60fps, or 4K @ 30fps, while the front can only record up to 1080p @ 30fps. The internal memory is only sold at 64GB of storage and 4GB of RAM.

=== Software ===
The Axon 7 was releleased with MiFavor 4.0 interface based on Android 6.0.1 Marshmallow. It was updated to Android 7.1.1 Nougat and then updated to MiFavor 5.2 based on Android 8.0 Oreo.

== Review & Controversy ==
- Ben Sin from Forbes nonimated as the "best value and sounding smartphone in the world".
- Antonio Villas-Boas from Business Insider noticed more details than the S7's.
- A critic noticed that the manufacturer's interface was changed to Stock+ interface.

== See also ==
- Samsung Galaxy S7 - based from the same performance
