= Changhe Z-11 =

Chinese light utility helicopter

Z-11
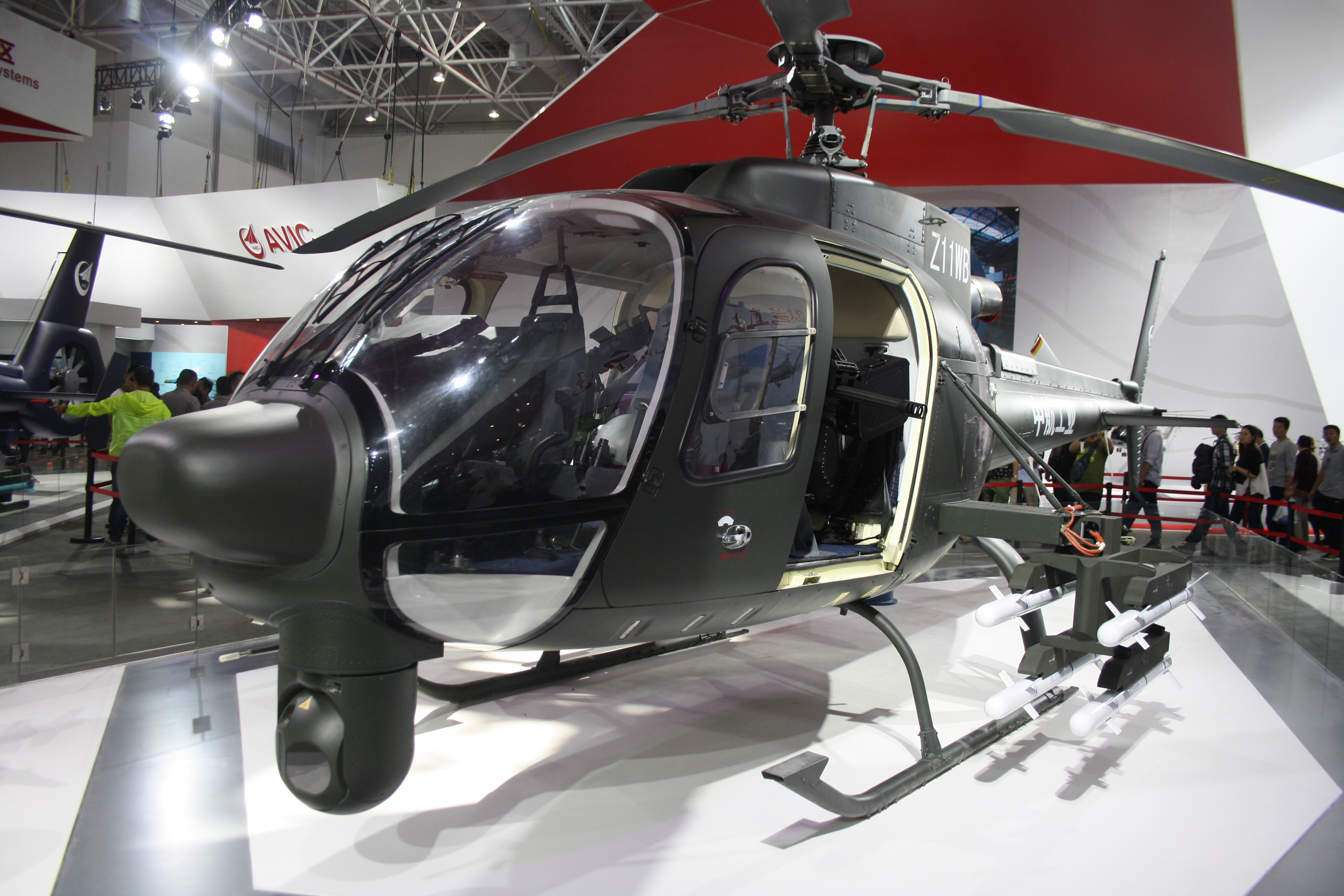
- A Changhe Z-11WB on display at the 2016 China International Aviation & Aerospace Exhibition.

General information
- Type: Light utility helicopter
- National origin: China
- Manufacturer: Changhe Aircraft Industries Corporation
- Status: Active, In production
- Primary user: People's Liberation Army Ground Force

History
- Manufactured: 1994-present
- Introduction date: September 1998
- First flight: 22 December 1994
- Developed from: Eurocopter AS350 Écureuil

The Changhe Z-11 is a light utility helicopter developed by Changhe Aircraft Industries Corporation (CAIC). According to the Changhe Aircraft Industries Corporation website, it is claimed to be the first indigenously-designed helicopter in China. However, it is largely based on the Eurocopter AS350 Écureuil.

== Development ==
The Z-11 project started in 1989 and the first flight was made in Dec 1994. In Oct 2000, test flights of Z-11 were completed. The chief designer of Z-11 is Mr. Wu Ximing (吴希明), who is also the chief designer of three other Chinese helicopters, including the Z-10. Under Mr. Wu, the Z-11 became the first Chinese helicopter to be completely designed using CAD/CAM techniques.

The Z-11WB, the attack and reconnaissance variant, features pintle mount weapons and two weapon pylons on each side of the aircraft. The engine is replaced by Turbomeca Arriel 2B1A turboshaft engine developing 632 kW (848 shp) of power.

== Variants ==
Z-11
original unarmed version.
Z-11W
military version of the Z-11 (battlefield surveillance and reconnaissance, ground attack, and medical evacuation roles)
Z-11WA
military reconnaissance and observation helicopter, fitted with a sensor pod.
Z-11MB1
civilian and commercial version fitted with French Arriel 2B1A engine
Z-11ME1
export civilian and commercial version.
CZ-11W
export light attack helicopter variation. It is powered by one WZ-8D, LTS101-700D-2 or Arriel 2B1A turboshaft engine and is equipped with integrated avionics systems, antitank missiles, rockets and machine guns. The helicopter is fitted with a targeting sensor turret, and can carry four Chinese HJ-8 antitank missiles.
Avicopter AC311
Multi-role civilian helicopter. Developed from earlier Z-11 models, featuring a redesigned airframe, cockpit, tail, a Honeywell LTS101-700D-2 engine, and other subsystems. 2 crew and four passengers. Maiden flight in 2011.
Avicopter AC311A
Multi-role civilian helicopter. Developed from AC311, featuring a redesigned main rotor and other improvements, a license-built Arriel 2B1A turboshaft engine. Maiden flight in 2013.
Z-11WB
Attack/reconnaissance helicopter developed from the AC311 platform. The first flight was on 28 September 2015. Officially unveiled at Zhuhai Airshow on 1 November 2016. Enhanced attack/reconnaissance variant with a new EO ball, redesigned cockpit, SW-6 UAV, and pylons for weapons. Its roles include ground support, attack, battlefield reconnaissance, command, counter-terrorism, counter-narcotics, counter-smuggling, and other tasks.

== Operators ==
China

- People's Liberation Army Ground Force: Z-11WB.
- Ji'an Municipal Public Security Bureau: AC311

== Specifications (Z-11J) ==
Data from Jane's All The World's Aircraft 2010–2011

General characteristics

- Crew: 1
- Capacity:
  - 3 (reconnaissance variants)
  - 6 (utility variants)
- Length: 11.24 m (36 ft 11 in) fuselage

13.01 m (43 ft) with rotors turning

- Width: 1.8 m (5 ft 11 in)
- Height: 3.14 m (10 ft 4 in) to top of rotor hub
- Empty weight: 1,253 kg (2,762 lb)
- Max takeoff weight: 2,250 kg (4,960 lb)
- Fuel capacity: 423 kg (933 lb) maximum
- Powerplant: 1 × Liming WZ-8 turboshaft engine, 510 kW (680 hp) for take-off

450 kW (603 hp) max. continuous
350 kW (469 hp) cruise

(can also fit Honeywell LTS101-700D-2 and Turbomeca Arriel 2B1A turboshaft engine)

- Main rotor diameter: 10.69 m (35 ft 1 in)
- Main rotor area: 89.8 m^{2} (967 sq ft)
- Blade section: NACA 0012

Performance

- Cruise speed: 258 km/h (160 mph, 139 kn) max at 1,000 m (3,300 ft)
- Range: 661 km (411 mi, 357 nmi) max
- Endurance: 4 hours 15 minutes
- Service ceiling: 5,270 m (17,290 ft)
- Hover ceiling IGE: 4,028 m (13,215 ft)
- Hover ceiling OGE: 3,369 m (11,053 ft)
- Rate of climb: 10 m/s (2,000 ft/min) at sea level

Armament

- Guns:
  - 1× 7.62 mm (0.300 in) pintle mounted CS/LM12 six-barreled minigun
  - 1× 40 mm (1.575 in) pintle mounted LG3 automatic grenade launcher
  - 1× 23 mm (0.906 in) pylon mounted gun pod
- Hardpoints: 16
- Rockets: Up to 2× 57 mm (2.244 in) unguided rocket pods
- Missiles:
  - Up to 4× TL-2, AG-300/M, CM-502KG air-to-surface anti-tank / anti-ship missiles
  - Up to 8× HJ-8, HJ-10 air-to-surface missiles
  - Up to 8× TY-90 air-to-air missiles
  - Up to 8× SW-6 air deployable tactical unmanned aerial vehicle (UAV)
- Bombs: Up to 4× FT-9 or YZ-212D laser-guided precision bombs

== See also ==
Aircraft of comparable role, configuration, and era

- Eurocopter Ecureuil
- Bell OH-58 Kiowa
- OH-6 Cayuse
  - MD 500 Defender
  - MH-6 Little Bird
  - Boeing AH-6
- Aérospatiale Gazelle
- HC-120
