= Alba AR1 =

Italian Formula 3 race car

- Category: Formula 3
- Constructor: Alba Engineering
- Designer(s): Giorgio Stirano

Technical specifications
- Chassis: Aluminium monocoque
- Suspension: Double wishbones, pull-rod, coil springs over shock absorbers, anti-roll bar
- Engine: Alfa Romeo 2.0 L (122.0 cu in) L4, naturally-aspirated, mid-engined
- Transmission: 5-speed manual

Competition history

The Alba AR1 was a one-off experimental open-wheel formula racing car, designed by ex-Osella engineer Giorgio Stirano, and developed and built by Italian manufacturer Alba Engineering; constructed to Formula 3 regulations, in 1981.
