= China Academy of Aerospace Aerodynamics =

Research institute in Beijing, China

The China Academy of Aerospace Aerodynamics or CAAA (in Chinese: 中国航天空气动力技术研究院) is a research institute of the China Aerospace Science and Technology Corporation. Its mission is for rockets, missiles and unmanned aerial vehicles (UAVs). It is headquartered in Beijing, China.

== Activity ==
CAAA produces the popular China's military export Rainbow UAVs, as well as the PW UAVs.

== History ==
Founded in 1956, CAAA was formerly known as Beijing Institute of Aerodynamics (BIA) and 701st Institute of CASC. Nowadays, it is also known as the 11th Academy of CASC.

== See also ==
- China Aerospace Science and Technology Corporation (CASC)
- List of unmanned aerial vehicles of the People's Republic of China
