= Zonergy =

Zonergy Corporation
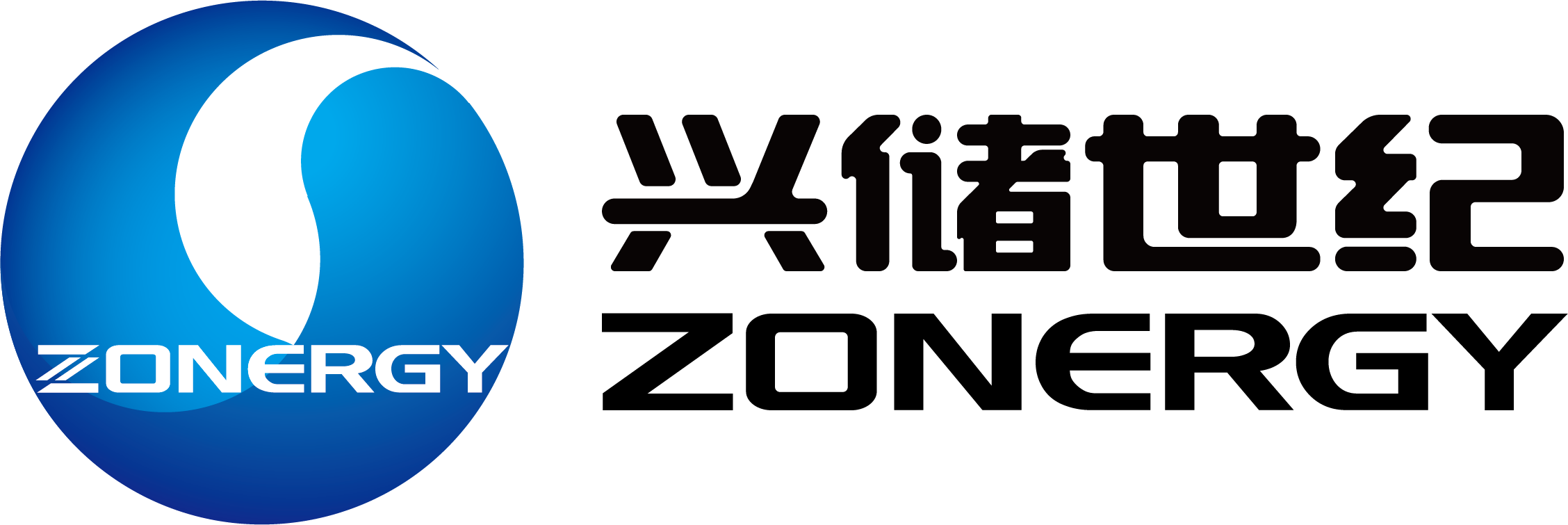
- Native name: 兴储世纪科技股份有限公司
- Industry: Electricity generation
- Founded: 2007
- Headquarters: Sichuan, China
- Key people: Guo Jun (President)
- Owner: Provincional state-owned
- Website: www.zonergy.com

Zonergy is a Chinese energy conglomerate engaged in the development of solar and biomass energy and the cultivation of palm oil.

== Corporate structure and history ==
Zonergy Corporation (hereinafter referred to as "Zonergy") is an enterprise founded in 2007.

== Zonergy Product ==
Solar Inverter Home Solar System Commercial Solar Systems

== Pakistani solar park ==
The company was contracted to expand electricity generation in Pakistan. As part of the US$46 billion China-Pakistan Economic Corridor, Zonergy agreed to develop the largest solar farm in the world, a 900 MW facility at the Bahawalpur Solar Power Park in the Cholistan Desert, slated to be completed in 2016. The framework agreement for financing the project by the Export Import Bank of China had been signed in the presence of China's paramount leader Xi Jinping and Pakistani Prime Minister Nawaz Sharif during an April 2015 visit by Chinese leader Xi Jinping.

However, subsequent articles indicate Zonergy failed to meet deadlines, with successful credit to the construction of the first 100 MW attributed to Xinjiang SunOasis.

== Palm oil ==
The company grows palm oil on 30,000 hectares in Indonesia. With large scale ambitions to produce palm oil over millions of hectares, the company has undertaken feasibility studies in Indonesia, Hainan, and the Democratic Republic of Congo to find suitable investment locations.

=== Proposed production in Congo ===
The company had long term business plans in 2008 to cultivate palm oil on over 2 million hectares in the DRC. The proposed project received high level attention from the then president, flying in 2007 soon after the founding of the company to guide the potential investment. He appeared in May 2007 with then Congolese agriculture minister Nzanga Mobutu for a press conference in which future plans for a palm oil processing plant and millions of hectares of cultivation was announced. A feasibility project was done at the local site with crops grown on a 10 hectare plot to explore the possibility of large scale cultivation. However the plan for large scale operations was scrapped after the company concluded that logistics in Congo would be hopeless. River transportation experts sent by the company found the Congo River to be a nightmare to navigate with sandbars frequently impeding transport craft and concluded that it would be too difficult to move construction equipment and machinery to the site to construct a refinery.
