= ZTE =

Chinese telecommunications company

ZTE Corporation

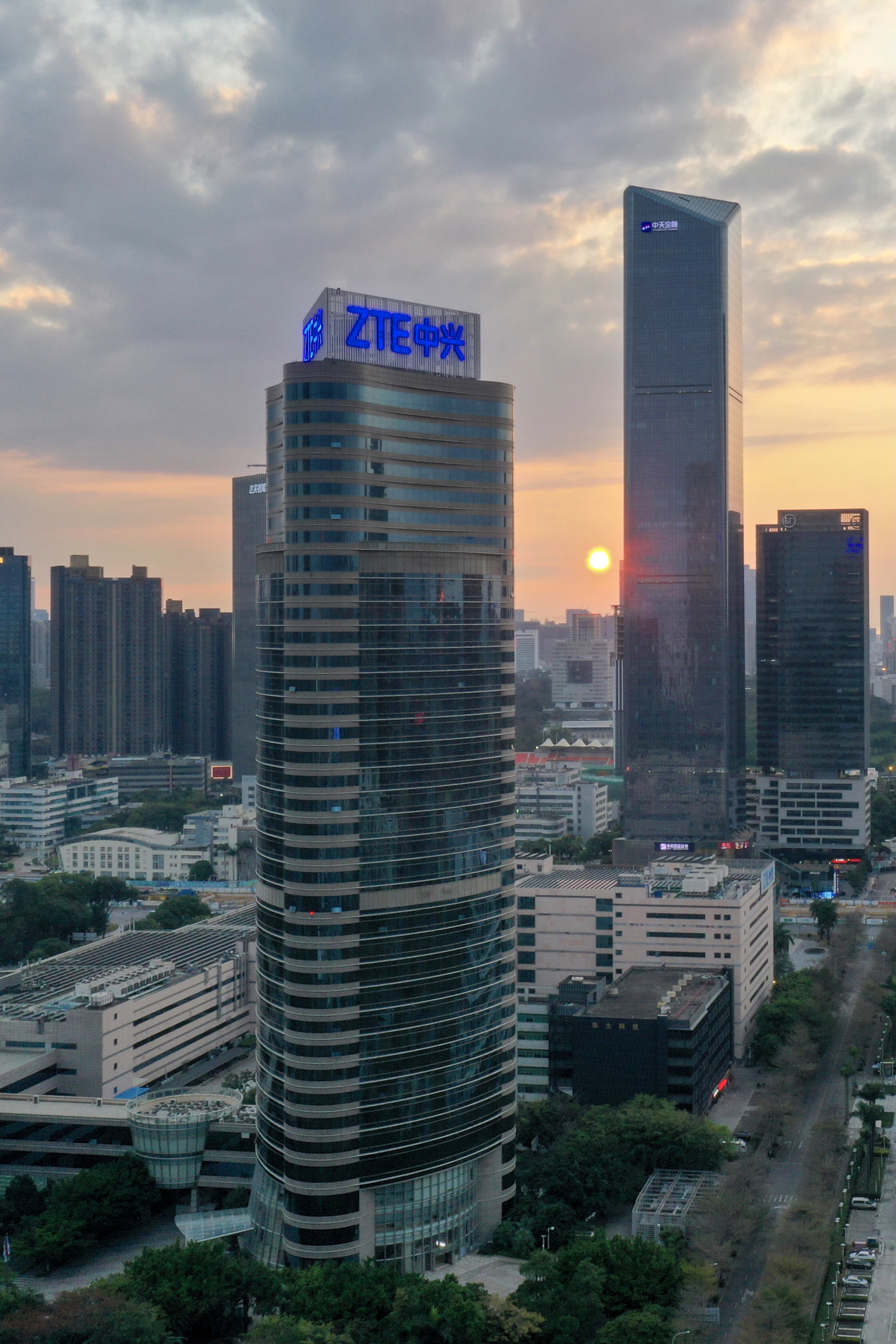
- ZTE building in Hi-tech Zone of Nanshan District, Shenzhen, Guangdong
- Formerly: Zhongxing Telecommunication Equipment Corporation
- Type: Public; state-owned enterprise
- Traded as: SZSE: 000063; SEHK: 763; CSI A50
- ISIN: CNE000000TK5; CNE1000004Y2
- Industry: Telecommunications equipment Networking equipment
- Founded: 1985; 41 years ago (as Zhongxing Semiconductor Co., Ltd.)
- Founder: Hou Weigui
- Headquarters: 55 Hi-tech Road South; Shenzhen, Guangdong, China; 518057
- Area served: Worldwide
- Key people: Ms. Fang Rong (Chairman and Executive Director); Mr. Xu Ziyang (Executive Director and CEO)
- Products: Mobile phones, smartphones, tablet computers, hardware, software, all series of wireless, wireline, services, devices and professional telecommunications services and services to telecommunications service providers and enterprises
- Revenue: ▲CN¥122.95 billion / US $17.68 billion (2022)
- Operating income: ▲CN¥6.16 billion (2022)
- Net income: ▲CN¥8.08 billion (2022)
- Total assets: ▲CN¥180.95 billion (2022)
- Total equity: ▲CN¥58.64 billion (2022)
- Owner: Zhongxingxin (20.29% in 2022); China Aerospace Science and Industry Corporation
- Number of employees: 74,811 (2022)
- Subsidiaries: Nubia Technology (49.9%); ZTEsoft; Zonergy
- Website: www.zte.com.cn
- Footnotes; In consolidated financial statement; shareholders' equity figure are excluding perpetual capital instrument

ZTE Corporation
- Simplified Chinese: 中兴通讯股份有限公司
- Traditional Chinese: 中興通訊股份有限公司
- Literal meaning: China-Prosperity Communications Company Limited by Shares
Transcriptions
Standard Mandarin
- Hanyu Pinyin: Zhōngxìng tōngxùn gǔfèn yǒuxiàn gōngsī
Yue: Cantonese
- Jyutping: Zung^{1}hing^{3} tung^{1}seun^{3} gu^{2}fan^{6} jau^{6}haan^{6} gung^{1}si^{1}

Alternative Chinese name
- Simplified Chinese: 中兴通讯
- Traditional Chinese: 中興通訊
- Literal meaning: China-Prosperity Communications
Transcriptions
Standard Mandarin
- Hanyu Pinyin: Zhōngxìng tōngxùn

Second alternative Chinese name
- Simplified Chinese: 中兴
- Traditional Chinese: 中興
- Literal meaning: China-Prosperity [or the word itself: resurgence]
Transcriptions
Standard Mandarin
- Hanyu Pinyin: zhōngxīng

ZTE Corporation is a Chinese partially state-owned technology company that specializes in telecommunication. Founded in 1985, ZTE is listed on both the Hong Kong and Shenzhen Stock Exchanges.

ZTE's core business is wireless, exchange, optical transmission, data telecommunications gear, telecommunications software, and mobile phones. ZTE primarily sells products under its own name, but it is also an OEM.

The company has faced criticism in the United States, India, and Sweden over ties to the Chinese government and the Chinese Communist Party (CCP) that could enable mass surveillance. In 2017, ZTE was fined for illegally exporting U.S. technology to Iran and North Korea, in violation of international economic sanctions. In April 2018, after the company failed to properly reprimand the employees involved, the U.S. Department of Commerce banned U.S. companies (semiconductors) from exporting to ZTE for seven years. The ban was lifted in July 2018 after ZTE replaced its senior management, and agreed to pay additional fines and establish an internal compliance team for 10 years. In June 2020, the Federal Communications Commission (FCC) designated ZTE a national security threat. In 2023, the European Commission banned ZTE from providing telecommunication services.

== History ==
Logo used until 2015

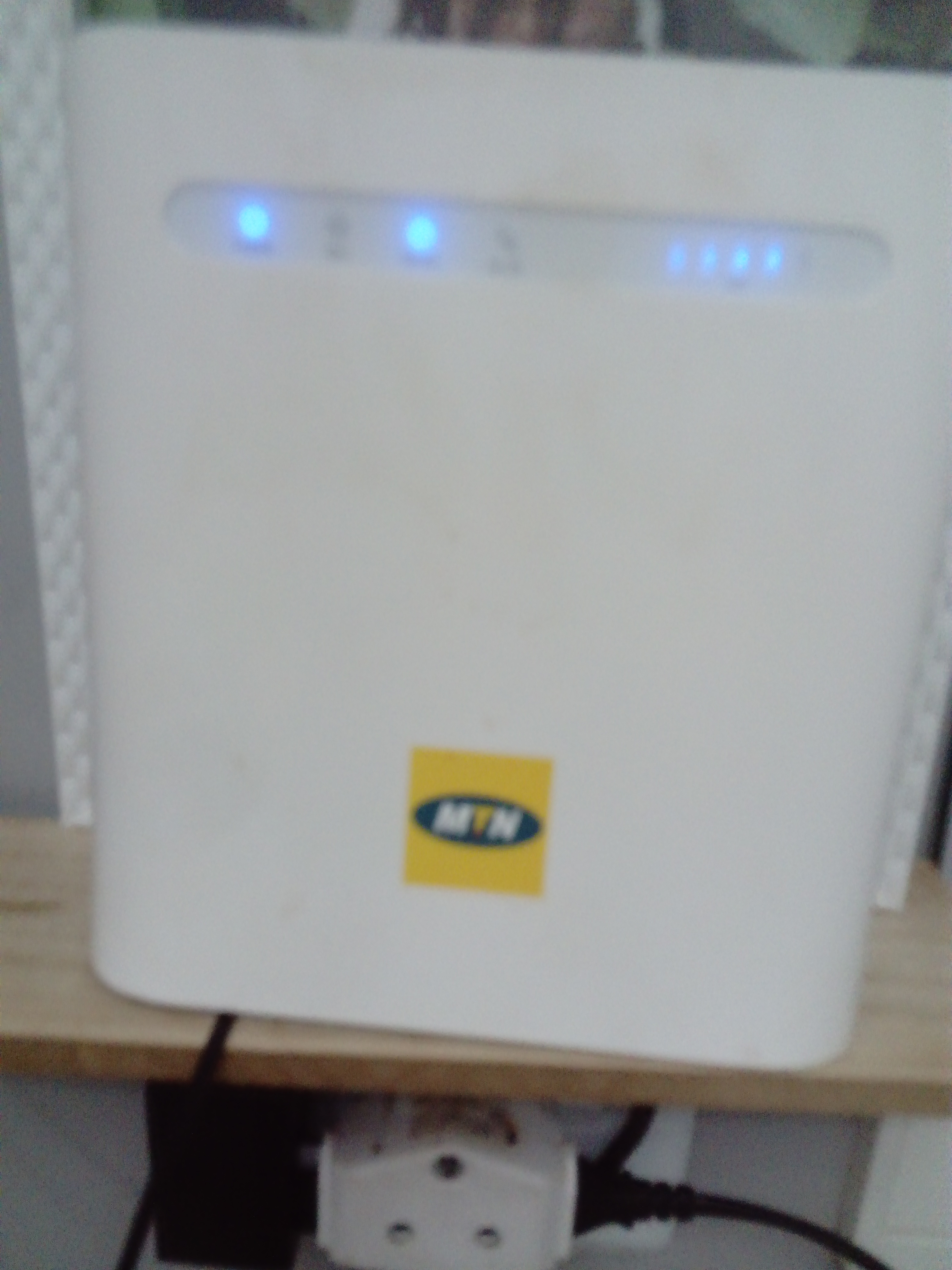
An example of a ZTE Wi-Fi router manufactured for South African telecommunications company MTN South Africa

ZTE, initially founded as Zhongxing Semiconductor Co., Ltd in Shenzhen, Guangdong province, in 1985, was incorporated by a group of investors associated with China's Ministry of Aerospace Industry. In March 1993, Zhongxing Semiconductor changed its name to Zhongxing New Telecommunications Equipment Co., Ltd with capital of RMB 3 million, and created a new business model as a "state-owned and private-operating" economic entity. ZTE made an initial public offering (IPO) on the Shenzhen stock exchange in 1997 and another on the Hong Kong stock exchange in December 2004.

While the company initially profited from domestic sales, it vowed to use proceeds of its 2004 Hong Kong IPO to further expand R&D, overseas sales to developed nations, and overseas production. Making headway in the international telecom market in 2006, it took 40% of new global orders for CDMA networks topping the world CDMA equipment market by number of shipments. That same year also saw ZTE find a customer in the Canadian Telus and membership in the Wi-Fi Alliance.

By 2009, the company had become the third-largest vendor of GSM telecom equipment worldwide, and about 20% of all GSM gear sold throughout the world that year was ZTE branded. As of 2011, it holds around 7% of the LTE patents.

In 2022, US court rules ZTE to end the five-year probation from a 2017 guilty plea.

In 2023, the World Intellectual Property Organization (WIPO)'s Annual PCT Review ranked ZTE's number of patent applications published under the PCT System as 11th in the world, with 1,738 patent applications being published during 2023.

In April 2025, U Mobile announced collaboration with ZTE to deploy Malaysia's second 5G network, with ZTE responsible for the 5G network in East Malaysia.

=== U.S. sanctions and import ban ===
In March 2017, ZTE pleaded guilty to illegally exporting U.S. technology to Iran and North Korea in violation of trade sanctions, and was fined a total of US$1.19 billion by the U.S. Department of Commerce. It was the largest-ever U.S. fine for export control violations.

ZTE was allowed to continue working with U.S. companies, provided that it properly reprimand all employees involved in the violations. However, the Department of Commerce found that ZTE had violated these terms and made false statements regarding its compliance, having fired only 4 senior officials and still providing bonuses to 35 other employees involved in the violations. On 16 April 2018, the Department of Commerce banned U.S. companies from providing exports to ZTE for seven years. At least 25% of components on recent ZTE smartphones originated from the U.S., including Qualcomm processors and certified Android software with Google Mobile Services. An analyst stated that it would take a significant amount of effort for ZTE to redesign its products as to not use U.S.-originated components.

On 9 May 2018, ZTE announced that, although it was "actively communicating with the relevant U.S. government departments" to reverse the export ban, it had suspended its "major operating activities" (including manufacturing) and trading of its shares. On 13 May 2018, U.S. president Donald Trump stated that he would be working with CCP General Secretary Xi Jinping to reverse the ban. It was argued that the export ban was being used as leverage by the United States as part of an ongoing trade dispute with China. On 7 June 2018, ZTE agreed to a settlement with the Department of Commerce in order to lift the import ban. The company agreed to pay a US$1 billion fine, place an additional US$400 million of suspended penalty money in escrow, replace its entire senior management, and establish a compliance department selected by the department.

Later that month, the U.S. Senate passed a version of the National Defense Authorization Act for Fiscal Year 2019 that blocked the settlement, and banned the federal government from purchasing equipment from Huawei and ZTE (citing them as national security risks due to risks of Chinese government surveillance). The settlement was criticized by Senators as being "personal favors" between Trump and the Chinese government, as the Chinese government issued a loan for an Indonesian theme park project with a Trump golf course following the May 2018 announcement. However, the House version of the bill, signed by Trump, did not include the provision blocking the settlement, but still included the ban on federal purchase of Huawei and ZTE products.

On 13 July 2018, the denial order was officially lifted.

In January 2019, it became public that ZTE has retained the services of former senator Joe Lieberman as a lobbyist.

In June 2020, the Federal Communications Commission (FCC) designated ZTE as a threat to U.S. communications networks. In July 2020, the U.S. government banned companies that use ZTE from receiving federal contracts. The FCC denied the company's appeal of the decision in November 2020.

In September 2020, the U.S. Department of Justice filed a criminal complaint against ZTE accusing it of using two shell companies named Ryer International Trading and Rensy International Trading to violate sanctions against North Korea. In December 2020, the U.S. Congress included $1.9 billion to help telecom carriers in rural areas of the U.S. to remove ZTE equipment and networks they had previously purchased.

In January 2021, Gina Raimondo, President Joe Biden's nominee for United States Secretary of Commerce, said in her confirmation hearings that she would protect U.S. networks from interference by Chinese companies including ZTE. In June 2021, the FCC voted unanimously to prohibit approvals of ZTE gear in U.S. telecommunication networks on national security grounds.

In March 2022, ZTE was accused of violating its probation from its guilty plea for sanctions violations. After President Joe Biden signed into law the Secure Equipment Act of 2021, in November 2022, the FCC banned sales or import of equipment made by ZTE for national security reasons.

In March 2025, the FCC opened an investigation into ZTE and other Chinese companies regarding operations in the U.S. in violation of restrictions.

=== Bribery investigation ===
In 2020, it was disclosed that the United States Department of Justice opened an investigation into ZTE for potential violations of the Foreign Corrupt Practices Act.

== Ownership ==
As of 30 June 2019, Zhongxing Xin (Chinese: 中興新; lit. 'Zhongxing New'; aka ZTE Holdings), an intermediate holding company, owned 27.40% stake of ZTE. The shareholders of ZTE Holdings were Xi'an Microelectronics (Chinese: 西安微电子技术研究所; a subsidiary of the state-owned China Academy of Aerospace Electronics Technology) with 34%, Aerospace Guangyu (Chinese: 深圳航天广宇工业有限公司; a subsidiary of the state-owned China Aerospace Science and Industry Corporation Shenzhen Group) with 14.5%, Zhongxing WXT (Chinese: 深圳市中兴维先通设备有限公司; aka Zhongxing Weixiantong) with 49%, and a private equity fund Guoxing Ruike (Chinese: 國興睿科) with 2.5%. The first two shareholders are state-owned enterprises, nominating 5 out 9 directors of ZTE Holdings, while Zhongxing WXT was owned by the founders of ZTE, including Hou Weigui, which Zhongxing WXT nominated the rest of the directors (4 out 9) of ZTE Holdings.

The mixed ownership model of ZTE was described as "a firm is an SOE from the standpoint of ownership, but a POE [privately owned enterprises] from the standpoint of management" by an article in The Georgetown Law Journal. ZTE described itself as "state-owned and private-run". The Financial Times described ZTE as state-owned. Other scholars have noted the links between ZTE's state-owned shareholders and the People's Liberation Army.

== Subsidiaries ==
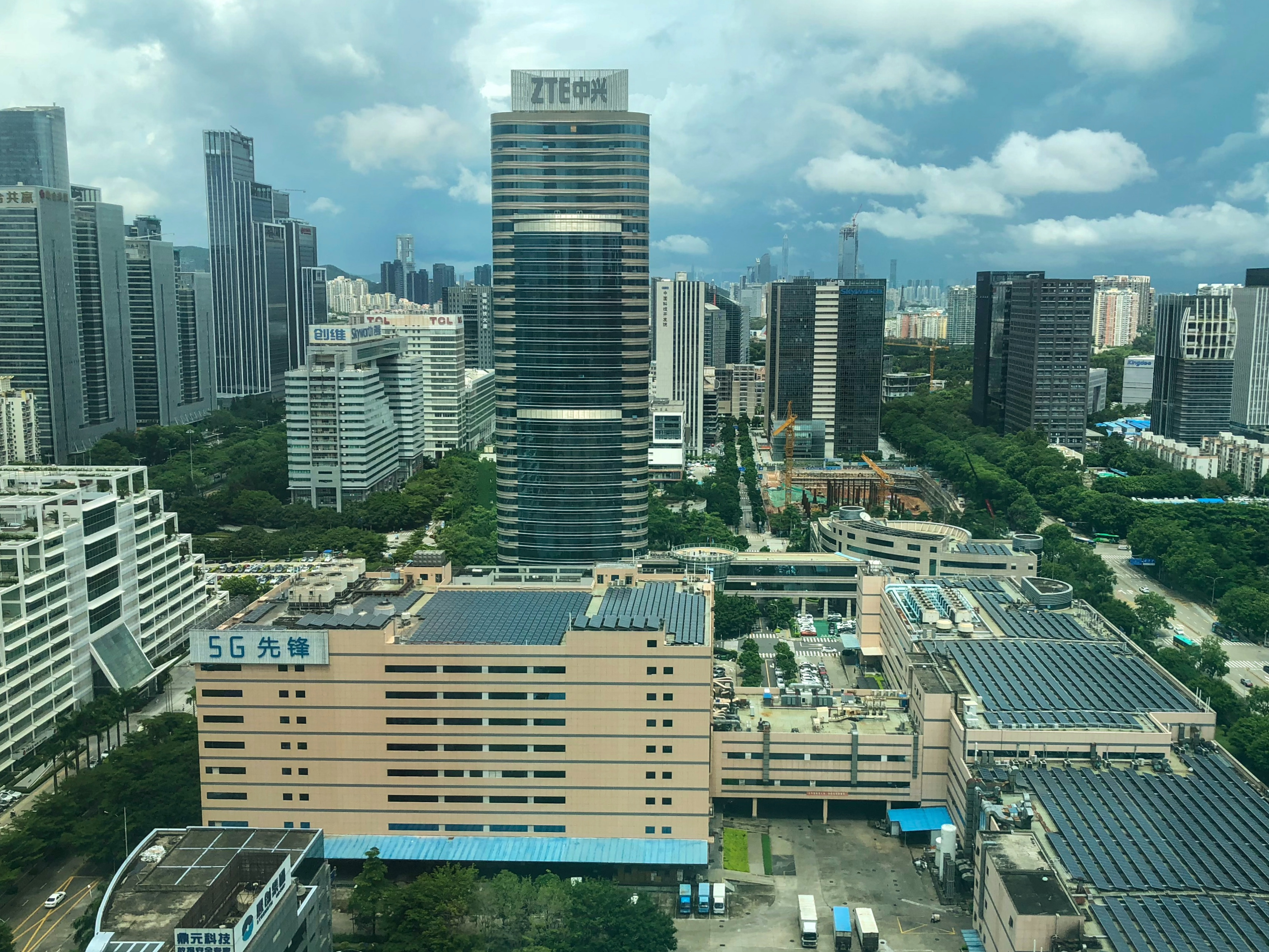
ZTE in Shenzhen Nanshan Science Park

ZTE has several international subsidiaries in countries including Indonesia, Australia, Germany, the United States, India, Brazil, Sri Lanka, Myanmar, Singapore, and Romania.

ZTEsoft engages in ICT industry and specializes in providing BSS/OSS, big data products and services to telecom operators, and ICT, smart city and industry products and services to enterprises and governments.

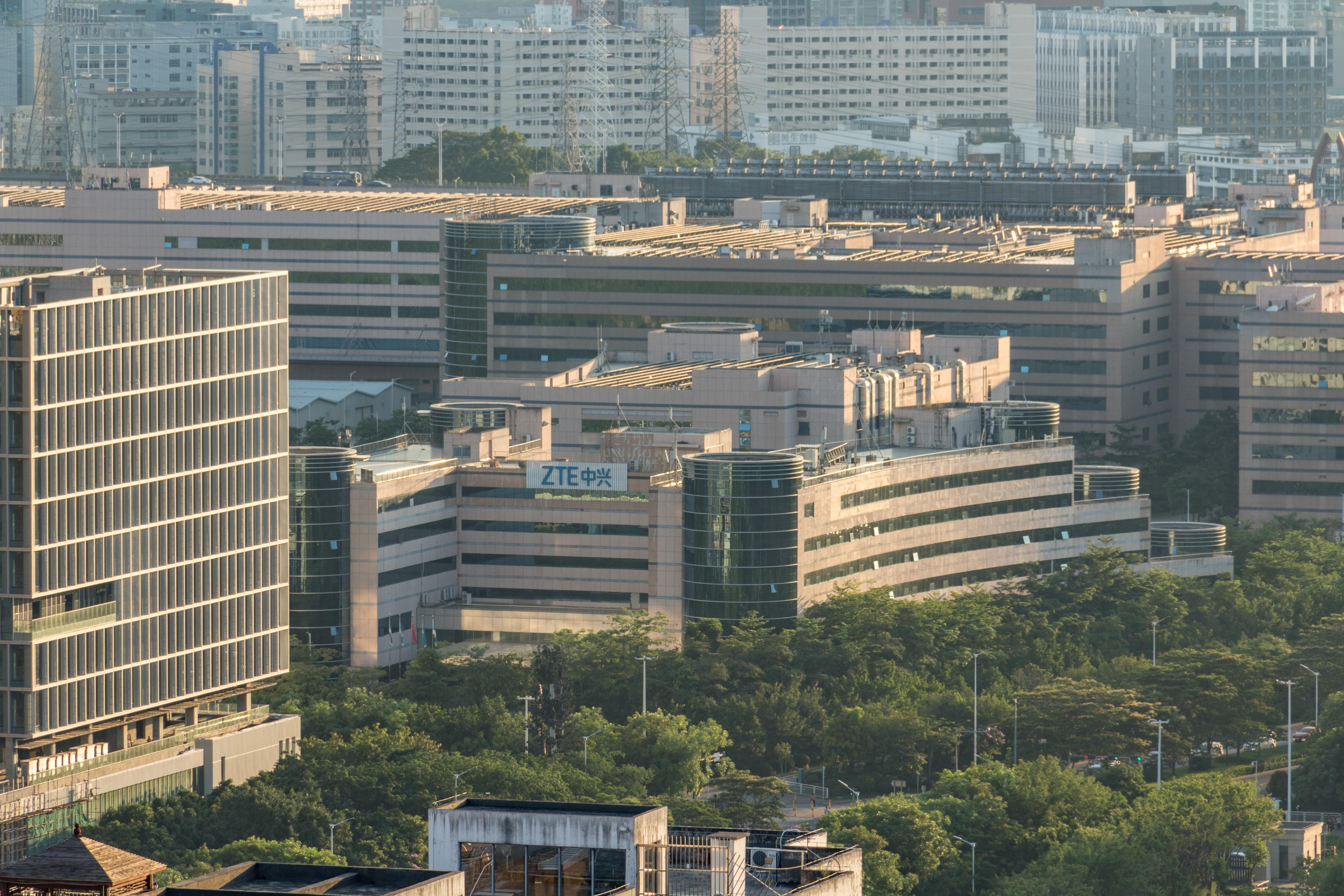
ZTE Office Building SZ1

Nubia Technology was a fully owned subsidiary of ZTE Corporation. The company has subsequently disposed of the majority of its equity in the company. In 2017 it reduced its stake to 49.9%.

Zonergy is a renewables company with interests in electricity generation through solar parks in China and Pakistan and palm oil cultivation in Indonesia to produce biofuels. ZTE is a major shareholder and was instrumental in the creation of the company in 2007 but holds a minority of the shares in the entity.

ZTE agreed to take over a 48% stake in Turkish company Netaş Telekomünikasyon A.Ş. for $101.3 million from the American private equity firm One Equity Partners in December 2016. Following the acquisition in August 2017, ZTE has become its largest shareholder while Netaş remains an independent company.

== Products ==
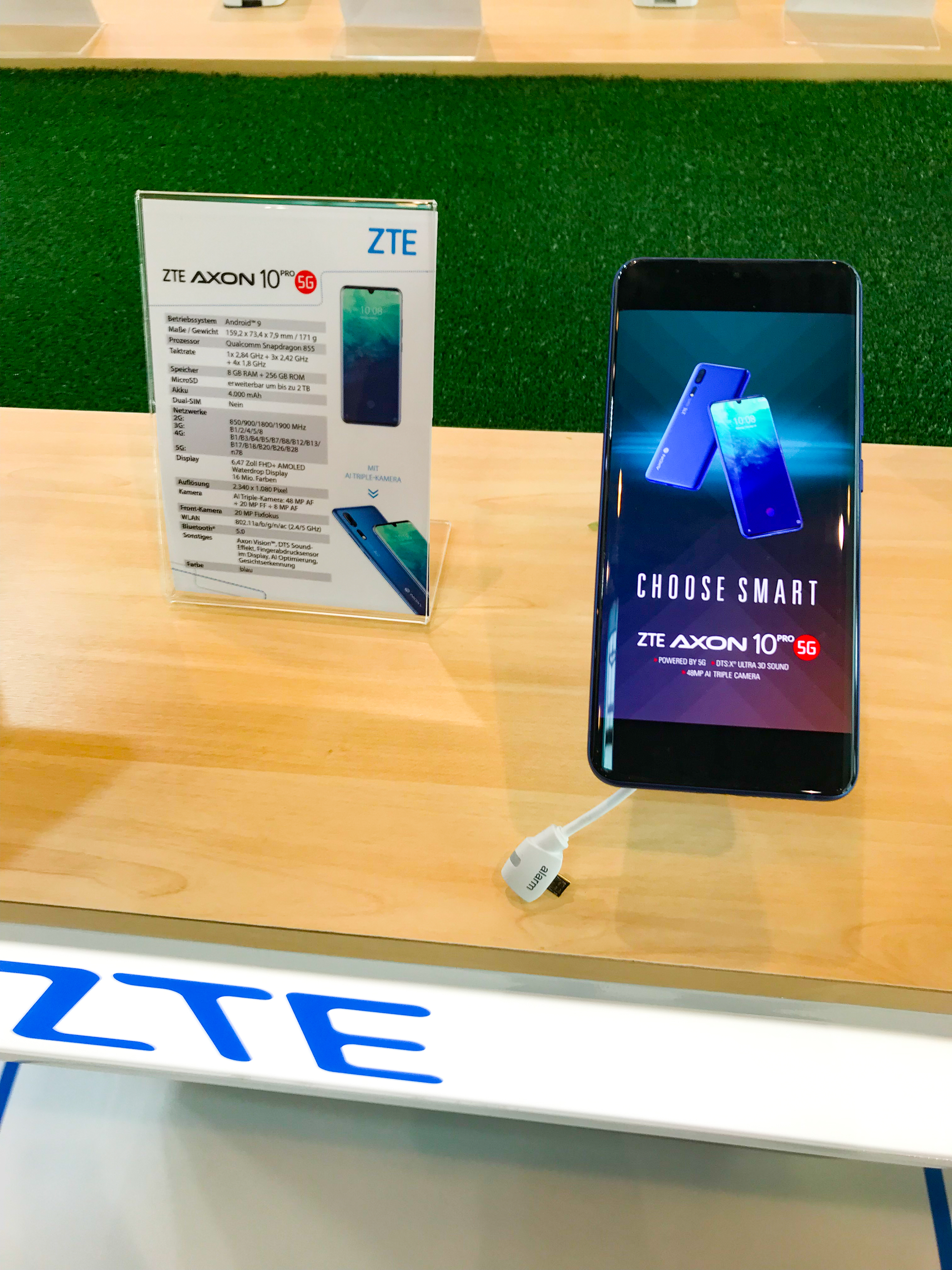
ZTE Axon 10 Pro

ZTE operates in three business segments: carrier networks, government and corporate business, and consumer business. In October 2010, ZTE's unified encryption module received U.S./Canada FIPS140-2 security certification.

ZTE was also reported to have developed identification cards for Venezuela that were allegedly used for tracking and social control.

=== Smartphones ===
ZTE markets its smartphones under multiple product lines, including Axon, Nubia, RedMagic, and Blade, each addressing different segments of the consumer smartphone market.

==== Axon series ====
- Axon
- Axon 7
- Axon 7 mini
- Axon 7 Max
- Axon 9 Pro
- Axon 10 Pro
- Axon 10s Pro

== Customers ==
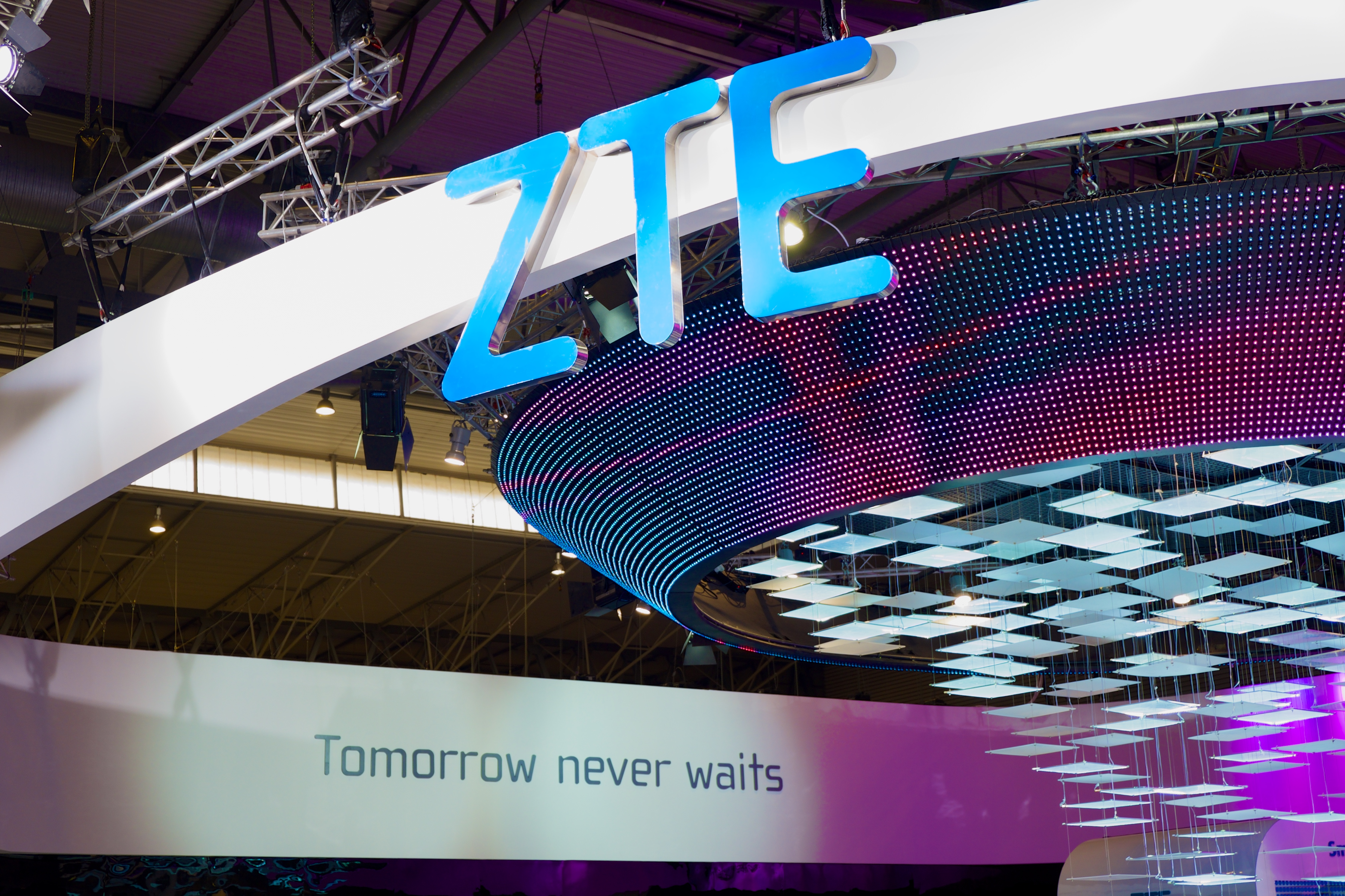
ZTE booth at Mobile World Congress 2015 in Barcelona

During the 2000s, the majority of ZTE's customers were mobile network operators that came from the developing world, but ZTE products also saw use in developed countries as well. Among ZTE's clients from the first world included Britain's Vodafone, Canada's Telus and Fido, Australia's Telstra, as well as France Telecom have all purchased equipment from ZTE.

Many Chinese telecommunications operators are also clients of ZTE, including China Netcom, China Mobile, China Satcom, China Telecom, and China Unicom.

ZTE began to offer smartphones in the United States in 2011. The company elected to focus its efforts on low-cost products for discount and prepaid wireless carriers, including devices with premium features typically associated with high-end products, such as large high-resolution screens and fingerprint readers.

== Sponsorship ==
In May 2016, ZTE became the co-sponsor of German football team, Borussia Mönchengladbach.

Since 2015, several U.S.-based National Basketball Association teams have had sponsorship deals with ZTE, including the Houston Rockets, Golden State Warriors, and New York Knicks.

== Reception ==
=== Bans ===
ZTE has been banned in multiple countries over national security concerns and alleged spying. In May 2026, the European Commission recommended that all EU member states exclude ZTE and Huawei equipment from their telecom infrastructure.

=== Bribery ===
Norwegian telecommunications giant Telenor, one of the world's largest mobile operators, banned ZTE from "participating in tenders and new business opportunities for 6 months because of an alleged breach of its code of conduct in a procurement proceeding" during a five-month time span ending in March 2009.

Contracts with ZTE to build a broadband network for the Philippine government reportedly involved kickbacks to government officials. The project was later cancelled.

Court documents filed in the US show that ZTE had a practice of handing over “brown paper bags” of cash to win contracts in West Africa. The company had an entire department dedicated to bribe management.

In December 2025, ZTE announced that it was in "ongoing communication" with the U.S. Department of Justice regarding its investigation into alleged ZTE violations of the Foreign Corrupt Practices Act (FCPA) involving bribery to secure telecommunications contracts in South America.

=== Surveillance system sale ===
In December 2010, ZTE sold systems for eavesdropping on phone and Internet communications to the government-controlled Telecommunication Company of Iran. This system may help Iran monitor and track political dissidents.

=== Security ===
At least one ZTE mobile phone (sold as the ZTE Score in the United States by Cricket and MetroPCS) can be remotely accessed by anyone with an easily obtained password.

ZTE, as well as Huawei, has faced scrutiny by the U.S. federal government over allegations that Chinese government surveillance could be performed through its handsets and infrastructure equipment. In 2012, the House Permanent Select Committee on Intelligence issued a report recommending that the government be prohibited from purchasing equipment from the firms, citing them as possible threats to national security. A ban on government purchases of Huawei and ZTE equipment was formalized in a defense funding bill passed in August 2018.

Following the 2020–2021 China–India skirmishes, India announced that ZTE would be blocked from participating in the country's 5G network for national security reasons. Sweden has also banned the use of ZTE telecommunications equipment in its 5G network on the advice of its military and security service, which said China is "one of the biggest threats against Sweden." In 2025, the European Commission was reported to be exploring ways to phase ZTE products out of their member states' telecommunication networks, citing security reasons.

=== Operations in Russia ===
During the Russian invasion of Ukraine, ZTE refused to withdraw from the Russian market. Research from Yale University published on 10 August 2022 identified ZTE among the companies defying demands to exit Russia or reduce business activities.
