= AKD-10 =

Chinese air-to-surface anti-tank missile

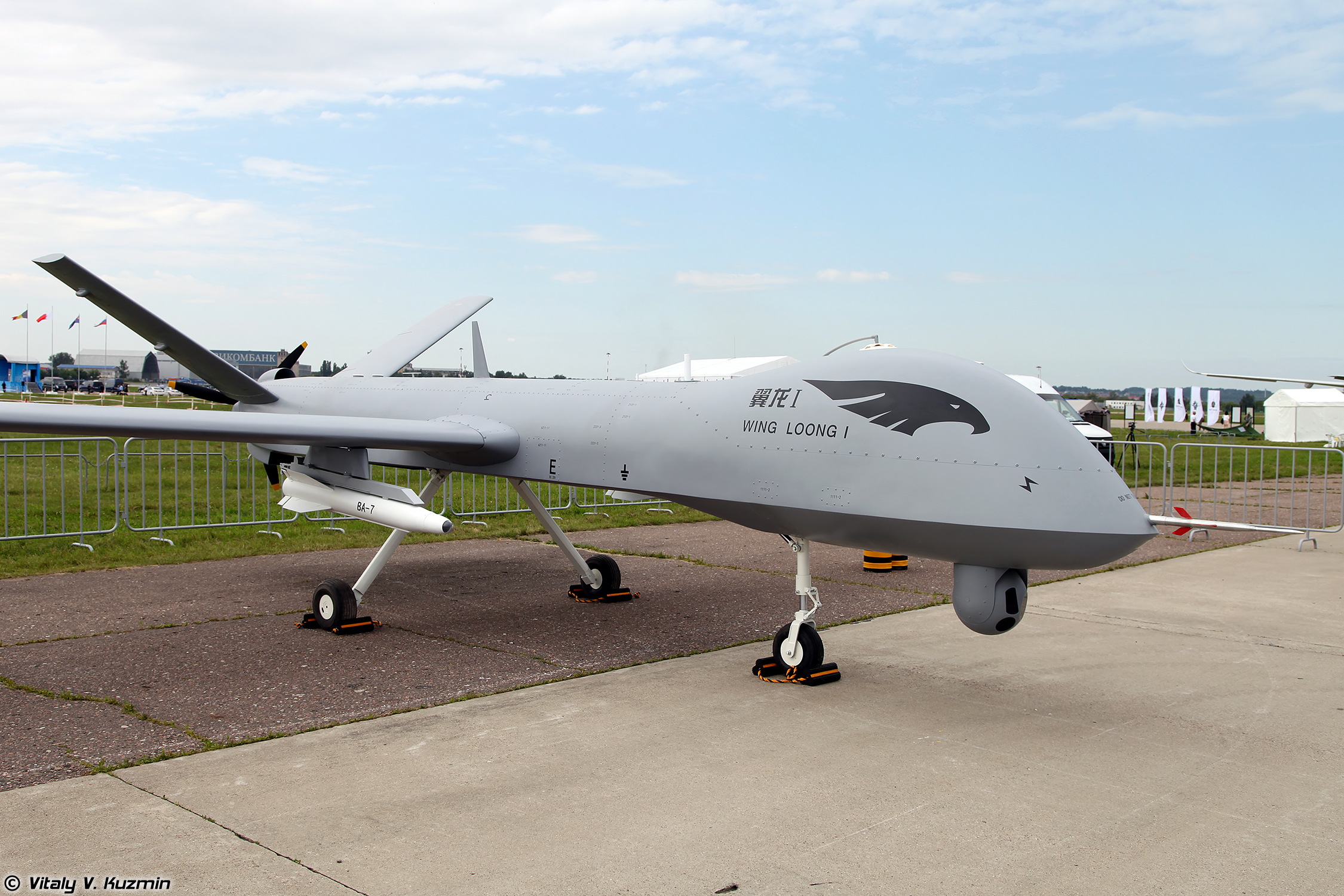
A BA-7 missile, the export variant of the AKD-10, carried by a CAIG Wing Loong drone

The AKD-10 is a Chinese air-launched anti-tank missile.

== Description ==
Early versions of the AKD-10 used semi-active laser guidance. Later versions may have millimeter wave radar. It has a 4.3 miles (6.9 km) range.

The AKD-10 should not be confused with the HJ-10 (Red Arrow-10) surface-launched anti-tank missile. The AKD-10 is called the Blue Arrow-10 and is similar in size and performance to the American AGM-114 Hellfire, whereas the HJ-10 is similar to the Spike-NLOS.

== Variants ==
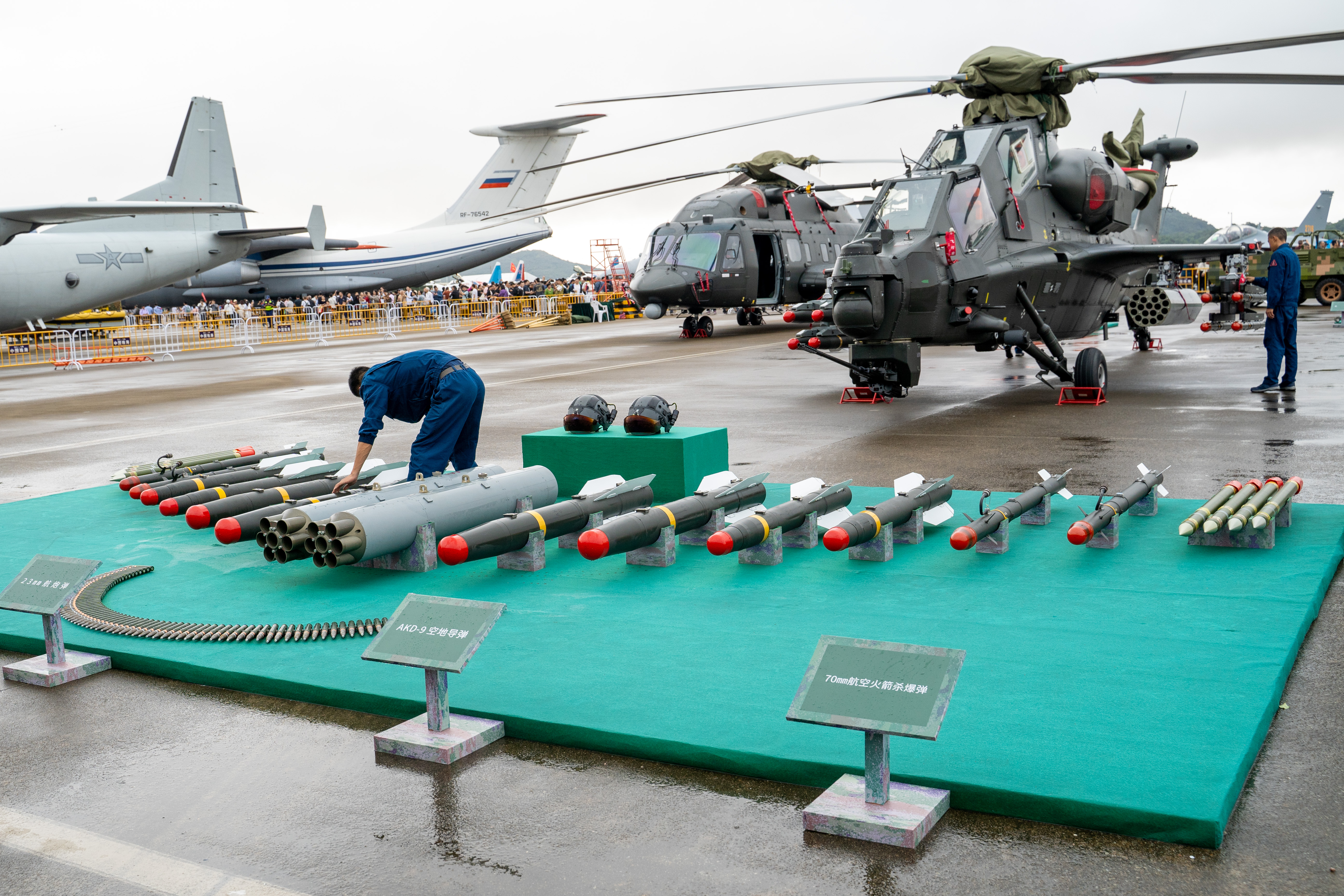
AKD-10 and AKD-9 missiles (center) displayed at Zhuhai Airshow 2024

=== BA-21 ===
An improved version of the AKD-10. The BA-21 is reported to have a dual-mode millimetre wave radar/ semi-active laser seeker, and a range of 18 kilometres (11 mi)

== See also ==
- AR-1 (missile)
- AG-300
