= China Aerospace Science and Technology Corporation =

Defense and aerospace company

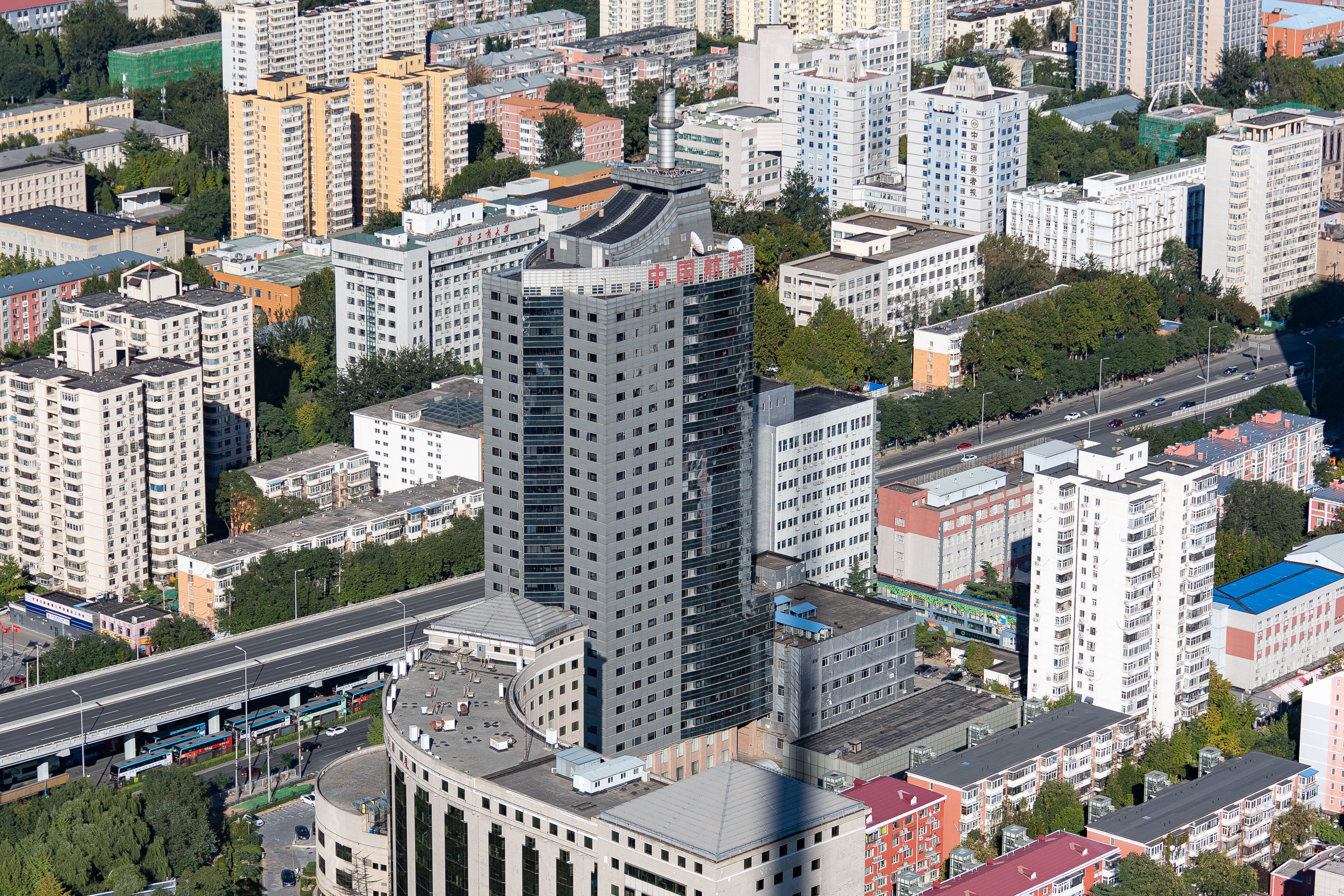
- CASC headquarters
- Trade name: SpaceChina (中国航天)
- Native name: 中国航天科技集团有限公司
- Type: State-owned enterprise
- Industry: aerospace, space industry
- Predecessor: China Aerospace Corporation
- Founded: July 1, 1999; 27 years ago
- Headquarters: Haidian District, Beijing, China
- Area served: Worldwide
- Key people: Wu Yansheng (Chairman and President)
- Products: Spacecraft; Missiles; Electronics
- Revenue: CN¥294.02 billion (2013)
- Number of employees: 174,000 (2014)
- Website: english.spacechina.com

China Aerospace Science and Technology Corporation
- Simplified Chinese: 中国航天科技集团有限公司
- Traditional Chinese: 中國航天科技集團有限公司
Transcriptions
Standard Mandarin
- Hanyu Pinyin: Zhōngguó Hángtiān Kējì Jítuán Yǒuxiàn Gōngsī

The China Aerospace Science and Technology Corporation (CASC) is a main contractor for the Chinese space program. It is state-owned and has subsidiaries which design, develop and manufacture a range of spacecraft, launch vehicles, and ground equipment. It also has a division for strategic and tactical missile systems.

== History ==
CASC was officially established in July 1999 as part of a Chinese government reform drive, having previously been one part of the former China Aerospace Corporation. Various incarnations of the program date back to 1956.

Along with space and defense manufacture, CASC also produces machinery, chemicals, communications equipment, transportation equipment, computers, medical care products and environmental protection equipment. CASC provides commercial launch services to the international market. By the end of 2013, the corporation has registered capital of CN¥294.02 billion and employs 170,000 people.

In December 2017, the CASC was restructured from a state-owned enterprise (全民所有制企业) to a state-owned enterprise with limited liability (国有独资公司) with the approval of the State-owned Assets Supervision and Administration Commission of the State Council (SASAC). The sole shareholder is SASAC, the company's headquarters are still in Beijing, the business areas remained the same and nothing changed for the staff either.

In 2021, China's 14th five year plan included two low Earth orbit satellite constellations named "GW" featuring nearly 13,000 satellites was in development.

== Subordinate entities ==
=== R&D and production complexes ===
- China Academy of Launch Vehicle Technology (CALT)
  - China Energine International (Holdings) Limited
- Academy of Aerospace Solid Propulsion Technology (AASPT)
- China Academy of Space Technology (CAST)
- Academy of Aerospace Liquid Propulsion Technology (AALPT)
- Sichuan Academy of Aerospace Technology (SAAT), maker of the Weishi rockets family
- Shanghai Academy of Spaceflight Technology (SAST)
- China Academy of Aerospace Electronics Technology (CAAET)
- China Academy of Aerospace Aerodynamics (CAAA)

=== Specialized companies ===
- China Satellite Communications
  - APT Satellite International
    - APT Satellite Holdings
- China Great Wall Industry Corporation Limited (CGWIC)
- China Aerospace International Holdings
- Beijing Shenzhou Aerospace Software Technology Co, Ltd.
- China Spacesat Co. Ltd.
- China Siwei Surveying and Mapping Technology Co, Ltd
- China Aerospace Investment Holdings
  - Easy Smart Limited (易颖有限公司)

=== Directly subordinated units ===
The "directly subordinated units" of the China Aerospace Science and Technology Corporation are:

- China Astronautics Standards Institute
- China Astronautics Publishing House
- Space Archives
- Aerospace Communication Center
- China Space News
- Chinese Society of Astronautics
- Aerospace Talent Development & Exchange Center
- Aerospace Printing Office
- Aerospace Long-March International, a sales unit

== International reception ==
=== United States ===
In 2006 the US Department of the Treasury accused Great Wall Industry and its partners of playing a lead role in the development of the Fateh missile system, as Iran had no previous experience with solid-fueled ballistic missiles.

In November 2020, U.S. President Donald Trump issued an executive order prohibiting U.S. companies and individuals owning shares in companies that the United States Department of Defense has listed as having links to the People's Liberation Army, which included CASC. In August 2022, CASC's 9th Academy 771 and 772 Research Institutes were added to the United States Department of Commerce's Entity List.

== See also ==
- China Aerospace Science and Industry Corporation
- China National Space Administration
- Aviation Industry Corporation of China (AVIC)
- Commission of Science, Technology and Industry for National Defense
- CASC Rainbow (UAV)
