= S-24 rocket =

Soviet-designed rocket weapon

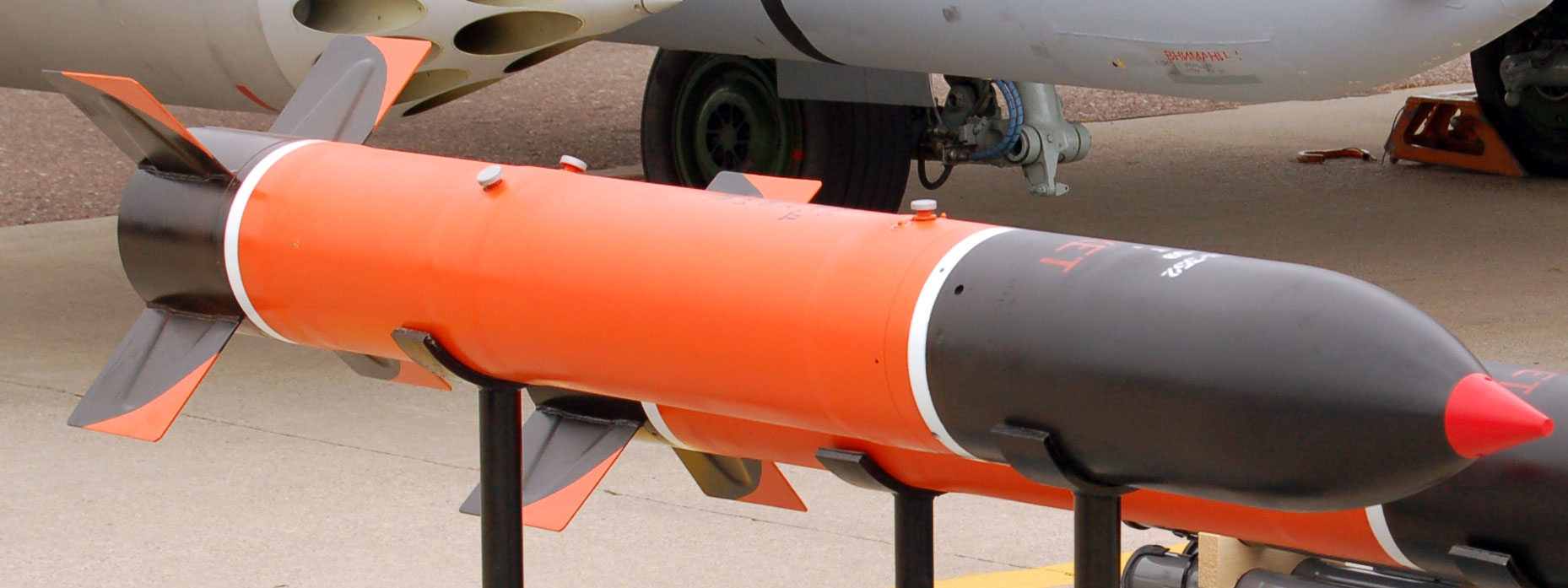
An S-24 on display at MAKS Airshow 2009.

The S-24 is a rocket weapon designed and used by the Soviet Air Force. It remains in use by the Russian Aerospace Forces, Ukrainian Air Force and many export countries. The name is based on the diameter of the rocket, 24 cm (9.4 in).

The Soviet Union was an enthusiastic user of rocket weapons, employing them as early as the 1930s. The S-24/S-24B is a very large, powerful unguided weapon and one of a handful of successors to the earlier World War II-era BETAB-750DS rockets.

The S-24B differs from the S-24 in that it uses BN-K low smoke motor powder for a low-smoke flight.

The S-24 is 2.33 metres (7 ft 8 in) long, with a launch weight of 235 kg (520 lb). It has a 123 kg (271 lb) blast-fragmentation warhead. Its range is about 2–3 kilometres (1.2–1.9 mi). The S-24 is carried individually on weapon hardpoints, rather than in pods.

Proximity fuze RV-24 for airburst is also available, in which the warhead detonate 3 meters above ground, creating 300–400 m radius of fragmentation casualty zone. The body is mesh-texture shape-hardened by electric treatment and creates 4000 fragments that can penetrate up to 30 millimeters of armor, though some sources dispute this and give a figure of 25 millimeters.

The rocket is also license produced in Iran under the name of Shafaq.

== See also ==
- RS-82 (rocket family) – (Soviet Union)
- S-5 – (Soviet Union)
- S-8 – (Soviet Union)
- S-13 – (Soviet Union)
- S-25 – (Soviet Union)
