= Mil Mi-28 =

Russian attack helicopter

Mi-28
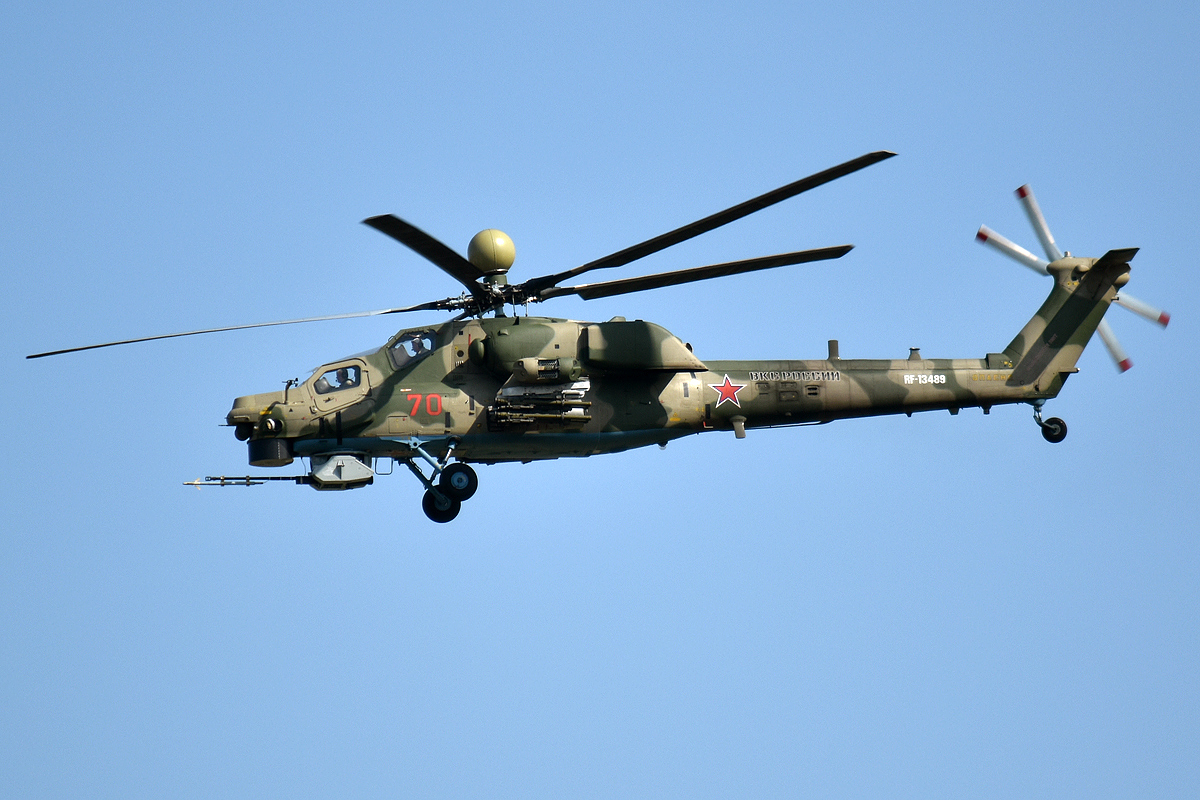
- A Mi-28NM of the Russian Air Force

General information
- Type: Attack helicopter
- National origin: Soviet Union; Russia
- Manufacturer: Mil
- Designer: Marat Tishchenko
- Status: In service
- Primary users: Russian Air Force Algerian Air Force; Iraqi Army Aviation Command; Uganda Air Force
- Number built: 190+ as of May 2025

History
- Manufactured: 1982–present
- Introduction date: 15 October 2009 (Mi-28N)
- First flight: 10 November 1982

The Mil Mi-28 (NATO reporting name "Havoc") is a Soviet heavy-weight, all-weather, day-night, tandem-seat anti-armour military attack helicopter. It is an attack helicopter with no intended secondary transport capability and is better optimized for the role than the Mil Mi-24 gunship. It carries a single autocannon in a rotating under-nose barbette, plus external loads carried on pylons beneath stub wings.

== Development ==
=== Origins ===
In 1972, following the completion of the Mil Mi-24, development began on a unique attack helicopter with transport capability. The new design had a reduced transport capability (3 troops instead of 8) and omitted the cabin to provide better overall performance and higher top speed. Improved performance was important for its intended role fighting against tanks and enemy helicopters and covering helicopter landing operations. Initially, many different designs were considered, including an unconventional project with two main rotors, placed with engines on the tips of wings (in a perpendicular layout); and in one similarity with the late 1960s-era American Lockheed AH-56 Cheyenne attack helicopter design, with an additional pusher propeller on the tail. In 1977, a preliminary design was chosen in a classic single-rotor layout. It lost its similarity to the Mi-24, and even the canopies were smaller, with flat surfaces.

Design work on the Mi-28 began under Marat Tishchenko in 1980. In 1981, a design and a mock-up were accepted. The prototype (no. 012) first flew on 10 November 1982. The second prototype (no. 022) was completed in 1983. In 1984, the Mi-28 completed the first stage of state trials, but in October 1984, the Soviet Air Force chose the more advanced Kamov Ka-50 as the new anti-tank helicopter. As per the decree of the Communist Party Central Committee and the Council of Ministers No. 1420-355, the Mi-28 was to continue development to meet foreign demand for Soviet attack helicopters. In December 1987, Mi-28 production at Rosvertol in Rostov-on-Don was approved.

An early production Mi-24 was fitted with an air data boom as an early test for the Mi-28's technologies. Later, a few Mi-24Ds were fitted up with the Mi-28's radome mount to test the sighting-flight-navigational complex's abilities, and others had redesigned fuselages that closely resembled the future Mi-28, but with rounded cockpits.

In January 1988, the first Mi-28A prototype (no. 032) flew. It was fitted with more powerful engines and a tail rotor with four blades in an "X" configuration, instead of the three-blade version. The Mi-28A debuted at the Paris Air Show in June 1989. In 1991, the second Mi-28A (no. 042) was completed. The Mi-28A program was cancelled in 1993 because it was deemed uncompetitive with the Ka-50; in particular, it was not all-weather capable.

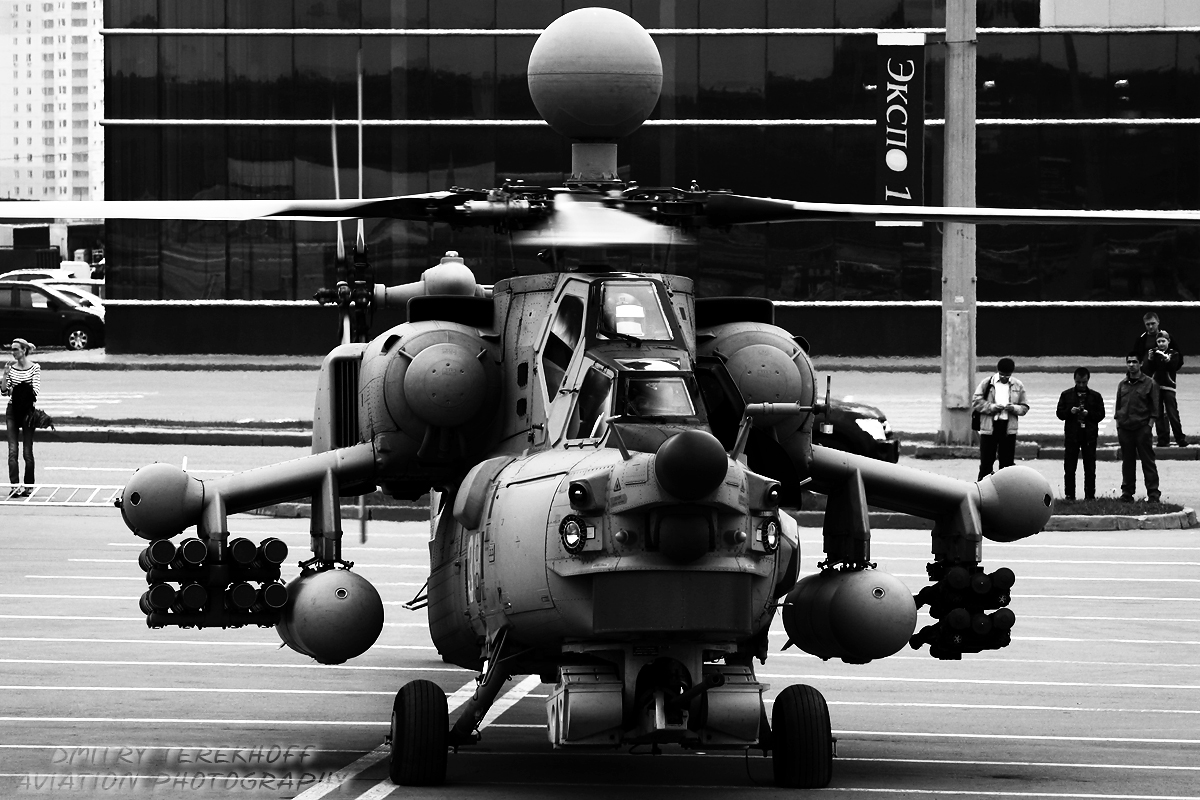
A Mil Mi-28N on display

The Mi-28N was unveiled in 1995, the N designation meaning "night". The prototype (no. 014) first flew on 14 November 1996. Its most significant feature is a radar in a round cover above the main rotor, similar to that of the American AH-64D Apache Longbow. The Mi-28N also has improved tor vision and an aiming device under the nose, including a TV camera and FLIR. Due to funding problems, development was interrupted. A second prototype with an improved rotor design was unveiled in March 2004 at Rosvertol.

The first serial Mi-28N was delivered to the Army on 5 June 2006. By 2015, 67 Mi-28Ns were planned to be purchased, when the Mi-24 was to be completely replaced. The Rostvertol plant delivered about 140 Mi-28N and Mi-35M helicopters in 2012–14 to domestic and foreign customers; 28 helicopters were delivered in 2015.

Mil also developed an export variant of the Mi-28N, designated Mi-28NE, and a simpler day helicopter variant, the Mi-28D, based on the Mi-28N design, but without radar and FLIR.

In 2016, Russian media reported a new, advanced helmet system designed to display visual information for aiming at targets in any field of view was under development for the MI-28N.

== Design ==
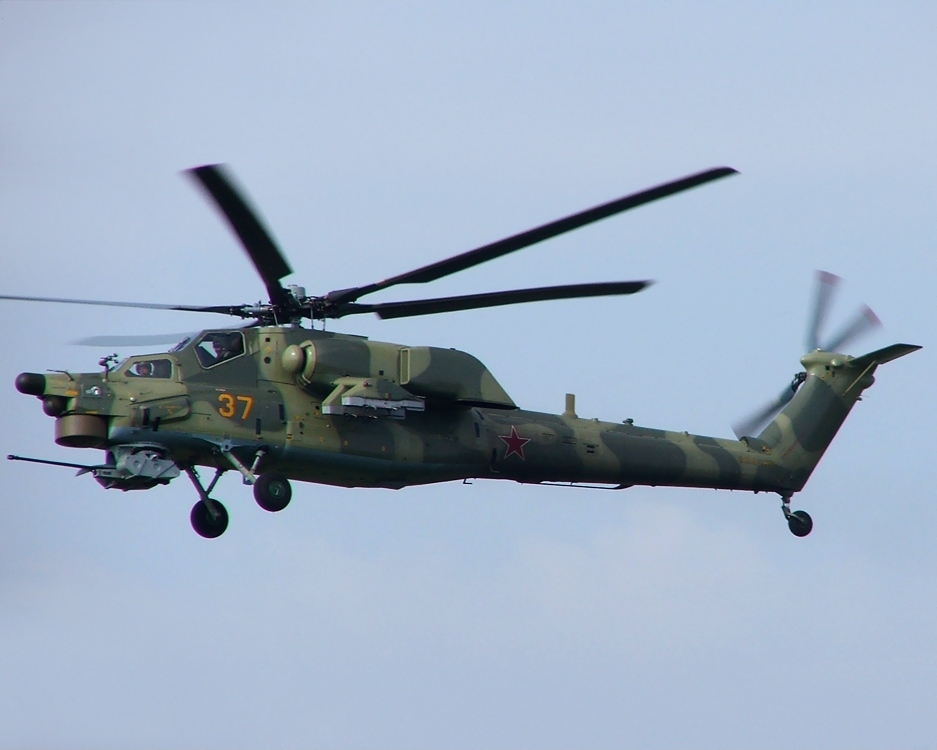
A Russian Air Force Mi-28

The Mi-28 is a new-generation attack helicopter that functions as an air-to-air and air-to-ground partner for the Mi-24 Hind and Ka-50 "Black Shark". The main rotor has five blades and is mounted above the body midsection. Short, wide, tapered, weapon-carrying wings are mounted to the rear of the body midsection. Two 2,200 hp Klimov VK-2500PS turboshaft engines, each producing 2,200 HP, are mounted alongside the top of the fuselage in pods with downturned, infrared-suppressed exhausts. The fuselage is slender and tapers to the tail boom and nose. It features tandem, stepped-up cockpits, a cannon mounted beneath the belly, and a non-retractable tricycle tail-wheel type landing gear. Due to the energy-absorbing landing gear and seats the crew can survive a vertical fall of up to 12 m/s. The Mi-28 has a fully armoured cabin, including the windshield, which withstands 7.62 and 12.7 mm armor piercing bullets and 20 mm shell fragments.

The main rotor head has elastomeric bearings and the main rotor blades are made from composite materials. The tail rotor is designed on a biplane configuration, with independently controlled blades in a non-orthogonal, X-shaped configuration with angles of 35° and 145°. Mi-28N aircraft are equipped with a new design of all-plastic composite rotor blades which can sustain repeated hits from 30 mm rounds. The cockpit is equipped with two heavily armored cockpits, a windshield able to withstand 12.7–14.5 mm caliber bullets, in-nose electronics, and reduced noise characteristics.

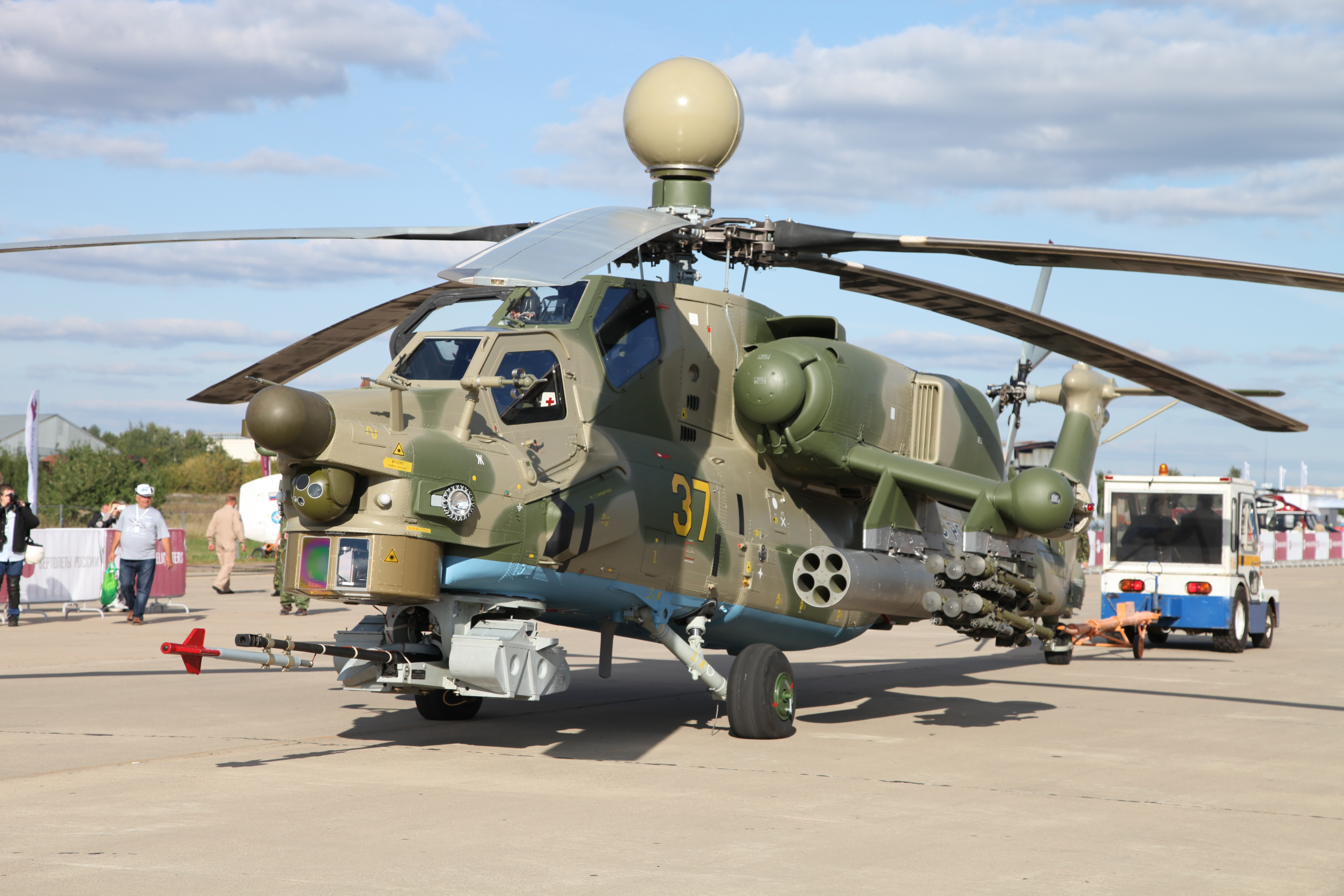
Mi-28N with radar station and new nose sensors

While the Mi-28 is not intended for use as a transport, it does have a small passenger compartment capable of carrying three people. The planned purpose of this is the rescue of downed helicopter crews.

The Mi-28N features a helmet mounted display for the pilot. The pilot designates targets for the navigator/weapons officer, who proceeds to fire the weapons required to fulfill that particular task. The integrated surveillance and fire control system has two optical channels providing wide and narrow fields of view, a narrow-field-of-view optical television channel, and laser rangefinder. The system can move within 110 degrees in azimuth and from +13 to −40 degrees in elevation.

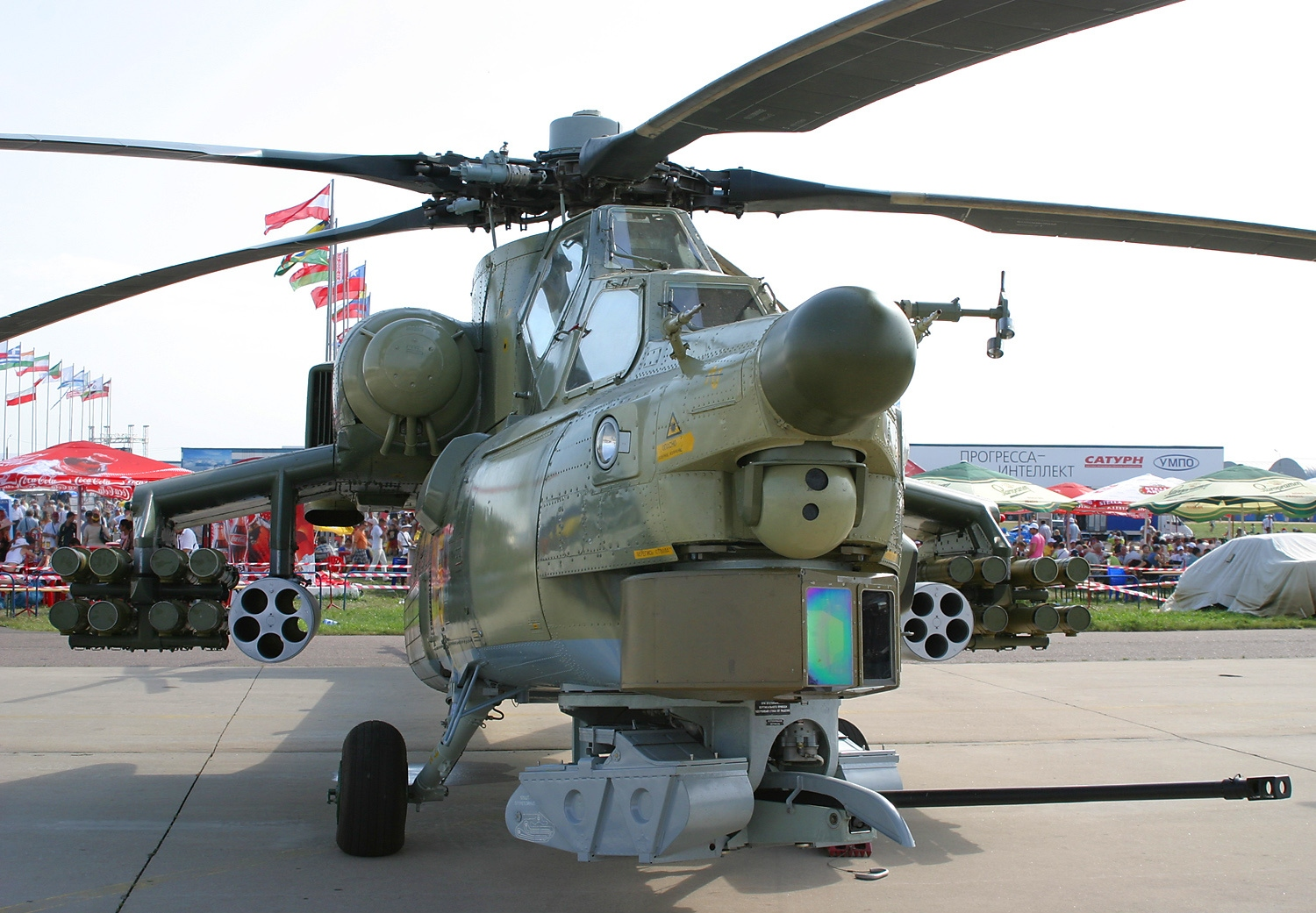
Mil Mi-28 nose sensors

The night attack variant helicopter retains most of the structural design of the original Mi-28. The main difference is the installation of an integrated electronic combat system. Other modifications include: a new main gearbox for transmitting higher power to the rotor, new high-efficiency blades with swept-shaped tips, and an engine fuel injection control.

The pilot uses a helmet-mounted target designator, which allocates the target to the navigator's surveillance and fire control system. The navigator/weapons officer is then able to employ guided weapons or guns against the target. The targeting system follows the direction of the pilot's eyes.

Russia's military rotary-wing aircraft fleet has been fully refitted with new night vision goggles (NVG). Mil Mi-28N attack helicopters of the Russian Aerospace Forces (VKS) received GEO-ONV1-family NVGs.

=== Armament ===
The Mi-28 is equipped with a chin-mounted NPPU-28 turret with 30 mm automatic Shipunov 2A42 autocannon. It has selective fire, and a dual-feed, which allows for a cyclic rate of fire between 200 and 800 rounds per minute. Its effective range varies from 1,500 meters for ground vehicles to 2,500 meters for airborne targets. Rounds from high explosive incendiary (HEI) to armour-piercing discarding sabot (APDS) can be used. Stated penetration for the 3UBR8 round is 25 mm of RHA at 1,500 meters.

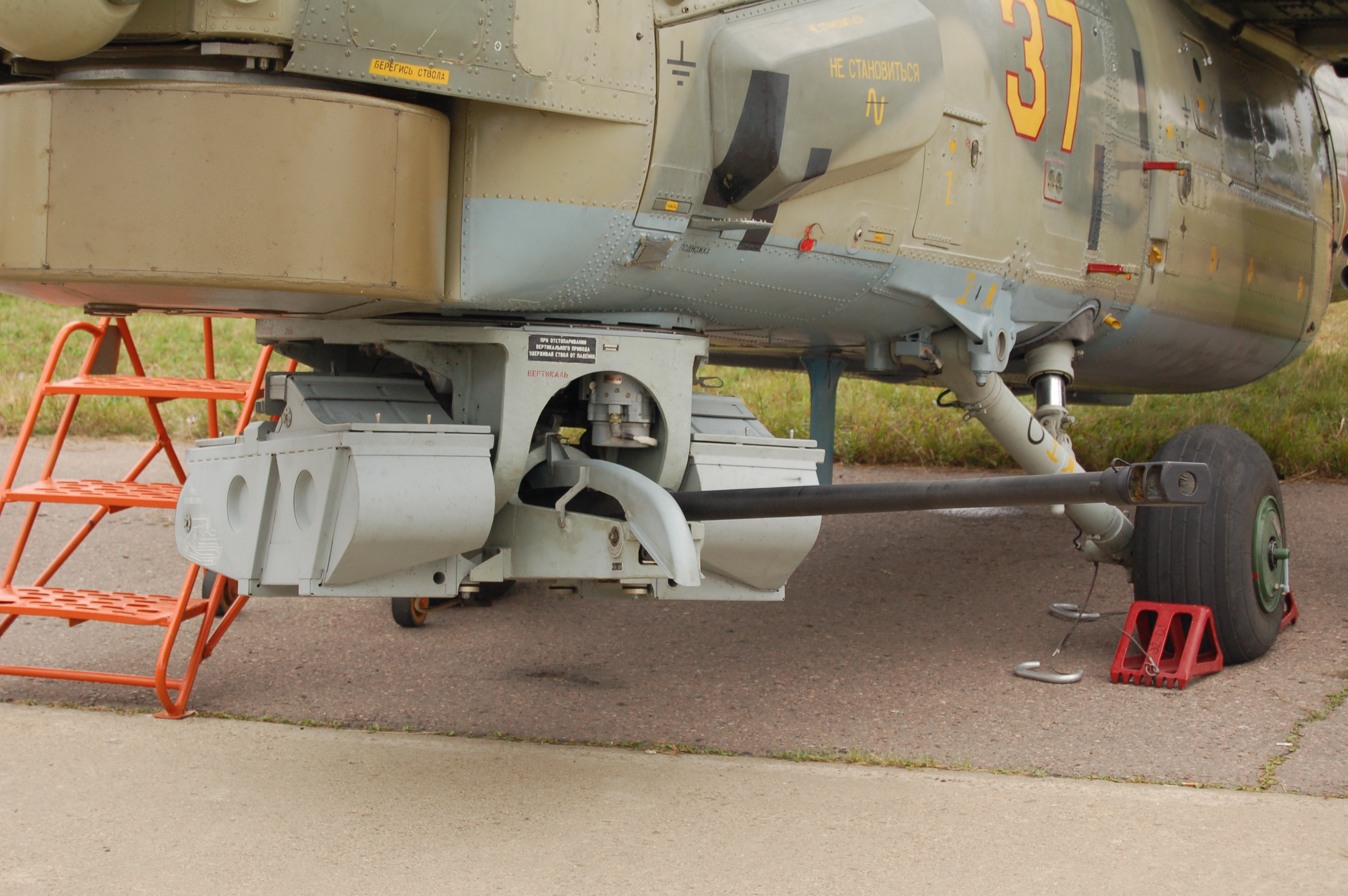
Mil Mi-28 gun mounting

The standard missile armament of the Mi-28N is the supersonic 9M120 Ataka-V missile, which uses radio beam-riding guidance. Two racks can each carry 8 Ataka missiles, giving a total of 16 missiles, although 8 Atakas is a more normal load. There are four variants of the Ataka missile for different tasks. The 9M120 Tandem high-explosive anti-tank (THEAT) warhead variant is used against tanks fitted with explosive reactive armor (ERA), its stated penetrative ability is 800 mm rolled homogeneous armour (RHA). The 9M120F thermobaric variant is used against infantry, buildings, bunkers, and caves. The 9M120O expanding rod warhead variant is used against helicopters. All the variants have a range of 6 km. The 9M120M improved version has a longer range (8 km) and better penetration (900 mm of RHA). All variants use SACLOS missile guidance.

Unguided weapons such as rockets can be carried on four pylons under the stub wings. Typical rockets carried are the 122 mm (4.8 in) S-13, fired from five-round B-13 rocket pods, and the 80 mm (3.1 in) S-8, fired from 20-round B8V-20 pods. The S-8 and S-13 rockets used by the Mi-28 are usually unguided. In the most common configuration, one can expect 40 S-8 rockets or 10 S-13 rockets. Both rockets have their variants, from HEAT warheads to thermobaric warheads. The S-8 has a shorter range and smaller warhead than the S-13, but compensates with numbers. Currently, the Russian Aerospace Forces are upgrading their S-8 and S-13 rockets to laser guided missiles with the proposed Ugroza ("Menace") system. Rockets upgraded under Ugroza received the designations S-8Kor and S-13Kor, respectively.

The Mi-28 can also carry the IR guided R-73 air-to-air missiles, the Kh-25 air-to-surface missiles as well as up to 500 kg aerial bombs.

== Operational history ==
=== Russia ===
The first production examples of the Mi-28N completed factory flight and armament tests in late May 2006, and were received by the Russian Air Force on 5 June 2006. The Mi-28N was officially accepted three years later, in October 2009. It was assumed the Mi-28N would fully replace the older Mi-24 variant in the Russian Armed Forces by 2015.

In September 2011, six Mi-28Ns of the Russian Air Force took part in the 2011 Union Shield joint Russian-Belarusian military exercise at the Ashuluk training ground in Astrakhan Oblast, Russia.

To improve the training of pilots for the Mi-28N, the Russian Defense Ministry announced the procurement of up to 60 Mi-28UB training-and-combat versions by 2020. Four to six Mi-28UBs would be purchased for every unit that operates the Mi-28N. An initial batch of 24 Mi-28UB training-and-combat helicopters was ordered in April 2016.

During the Russian military intervention of the Syrian civil war, the Mi-28N had its combat debut during the 2016 Battle of Palmyra when several Mi-28Ns of the Russian Aerospace Forces supported the Syrian Arab Army (SAA) in their advance towards the city. During their support to SAA, Russia's Mi-28Ns targeted several Islamic State positions with S-8 unguided rockets and 9M120 Ataka anti-tank guided missiles.

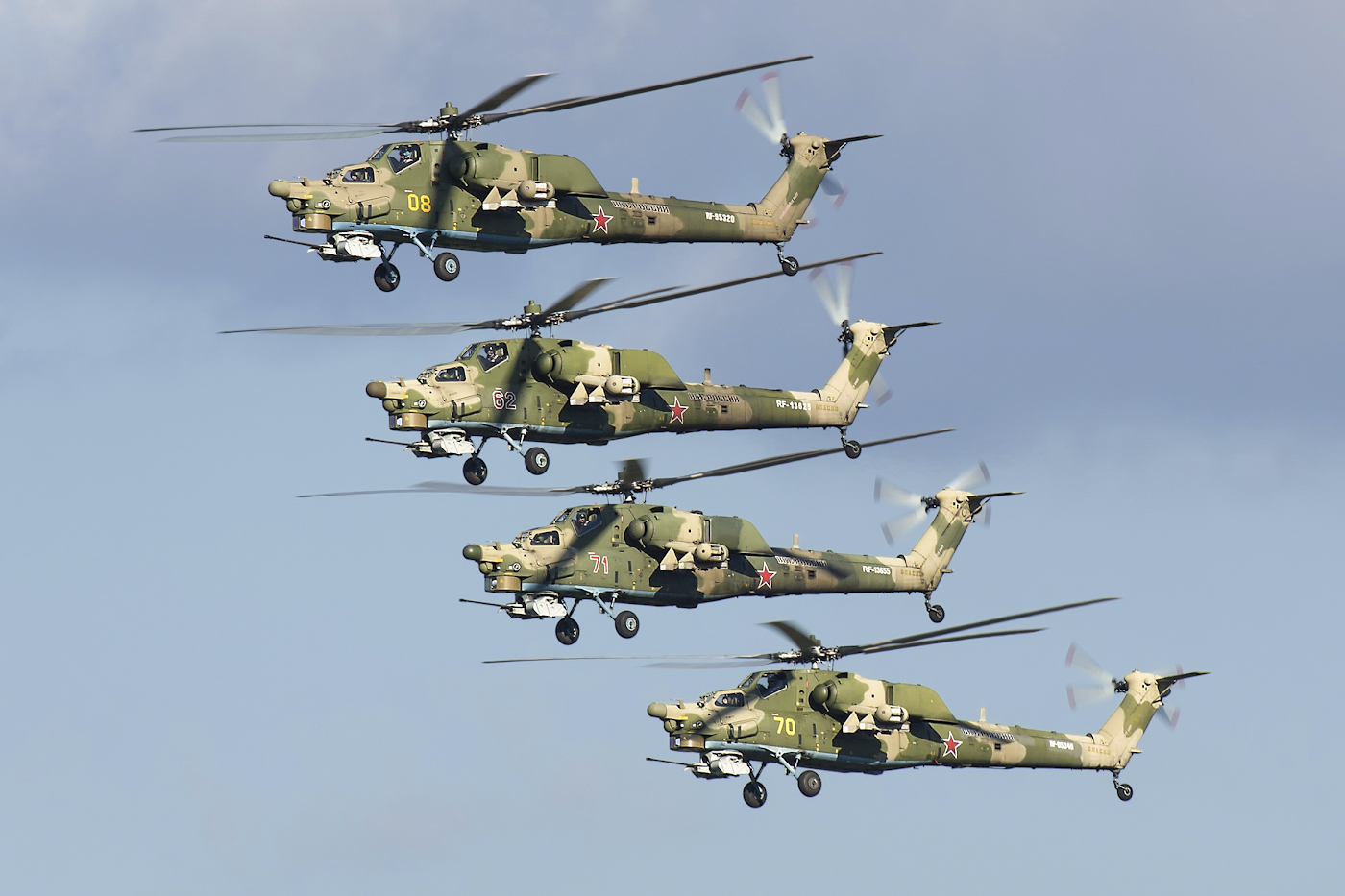
Mi-28N of Berkuts aerobatic team at ARMY-2020 forum

In October 2016, a prototype of an upgraded Mi-28NM helicopter performed its maiden flight. It was reported that a Mi-28NM prototype was sent to Syria to undergo testing in difficult weather and climate conditions. In July 2019, during the International Military-Technical Forum ARMY-2019, the Russian Defence Ministry and Rostec signed a long-term contract for the supply of 98 Mi-28NMs by 2027. A new contract was signed in August 2022.

The Mi-28N was deployed by Russia during the 2022 invasion of Ukraine. The Times reported that Ukrainian forces had successfully used a British-made Starstreak system to shoot down a Russian Mi-28N attack helicopter in early April. On 26 April, the wreck of a Mi-28 was found by Ukrainian forces outside the town of Hostomel in the Kyiv Oblast. The craft was likely destroyed during the Battle of Hostomel Airport. On 9 May, one Mi-28 was destroyed in north of Kharkiv, the attack helicopter with registration number RF-13654 was the third visually reported loss of that type. On 16 May, another Mi-28N with registration number RF-13628 was destroyed in Kharkiv. On 12 June 2022, a Mi-28N was destroyed and its wreck recorded in video by Ukrainian troops, the crew of the helicopter died at the crash site.

On 18 September 2023, Ukrainian military intelligence claimed the tail rotor of a Mi-28N was damaged in a raid against Chkalovsky Air Base near Moscow. According to a statement, the damaged helicopter was used to shoot down Ukrainian drones.

On 6 August 2024, the Ukrainian SBU stated that a Russian Mi-28 in Kursk Oblast was damaged by a first-person view FPV drone. The SBU claimed that it the first successful intercept of a helicopter, mid-flight, using a drone.

As of November 2025, 14 Mi-28s have been visually confirmed as lost and 4 damaged since the start of the 2022 Invasion by the Oryx blog.

On 29 April 2026, the Unmanned Systems Forces (Ukraine) destroyed four helicopters, two Mi-28 and two Mi-17s, while refuelling in Voronezh Oblast using drones.

On 15 July 2026, a Mi-28 was shot down by a Ukrainian FPV over Vyazovoye, Prokhorovsky District, Belgorod Oblast.

=== Iraq ===
In October 2012, it was reported that Russia and Iraq may sign a US$4.2–$5.0 billion weapons contract, including purchase of 30 Mi-28NE helicopters. The deal was confirmed on 9 October. The deal was reportedly cancelled due to Iraqi concerns of corruption, but that concern was addressed, and the Iraqi defence minister stated that "the deal is going ahead." As of December 2015, 15 Mi-28NEs had been delivered.

Iraqi Mi-28s reportedly saw their first use in combat in September 2014, only several days after their arrival in the country. However, official confirmation by the Iraqi ministry of defence only came on 30 October of the same year.

=== Algeria ===
In June 2010, Algeria was expected to place an order for 42 Mi-28NE helicopters. On 30 August 2016, Algeria displayed its first batch of Mi-28NE helicopters on television.

=== Potential operators ===
==== Bangladesh ====
In late December 2021, it was reported that Bangladesh is finalizing a deal to buy eight Mi-28NEs for the Bangladesh Air Force with necessary equipment, along with operation and maintenance training. At the end of 2021, BDT 4100 crore from the Bangladesh Bangladesh's Ministry of Finance approved approximately $520 million "At this time 1 USD equal 80 BDT" For the purchase of 8 helicopters "Attack or Transport". Bangladesh is spending around 65 million for each helicopter which is 2 times its market value and it is not sure if it is an attack or transport helicopter. The possibility of buying Mi-26 transport helicopter is much more than MI -28NEs Attack Helicopters. Bangladesh or Russian any officials do not have any statement about the deal. In 2022, Russian arms sales agency Rosoboronexport dismissed media reports that suggest Bangladesh has acquired Mil Mi-28NE attack helicopters.

==== India ====
The Indian Military requested a modified Mi-28 prototype fitted with French and Belgian avionics. Russian manufacturers discussed how to meet these requirements. In October 2011, it was reported that the American AH-64D had emerged as the front-runner ahead of the Mi-28N to fill a requirement for 22 attack helicopters. India ordered 22 AH-64Es in 2015.

==== Kenya ====
In late 2011, Kenya began the process of acquiring 16 Mi-28s for its Embakasi-based 50th Air Cavalry Division. They were set to be delivered to the 50th Air Cavalry Division in Kenya on 3 January 2012, from the Russian state-owned corporation Rosoboronexport, which is an intermediary for all imports and exports of military-related hardware. However, in 2013, Oboronprom denied reports that the type had been accepted for service with the Kenyan military.

==== Venezuela ====
In April 2010, Venezuela agreed to order 10 Mi-28s for the Venezuelan Army. However, no deal was signed after this.

== Variants ==
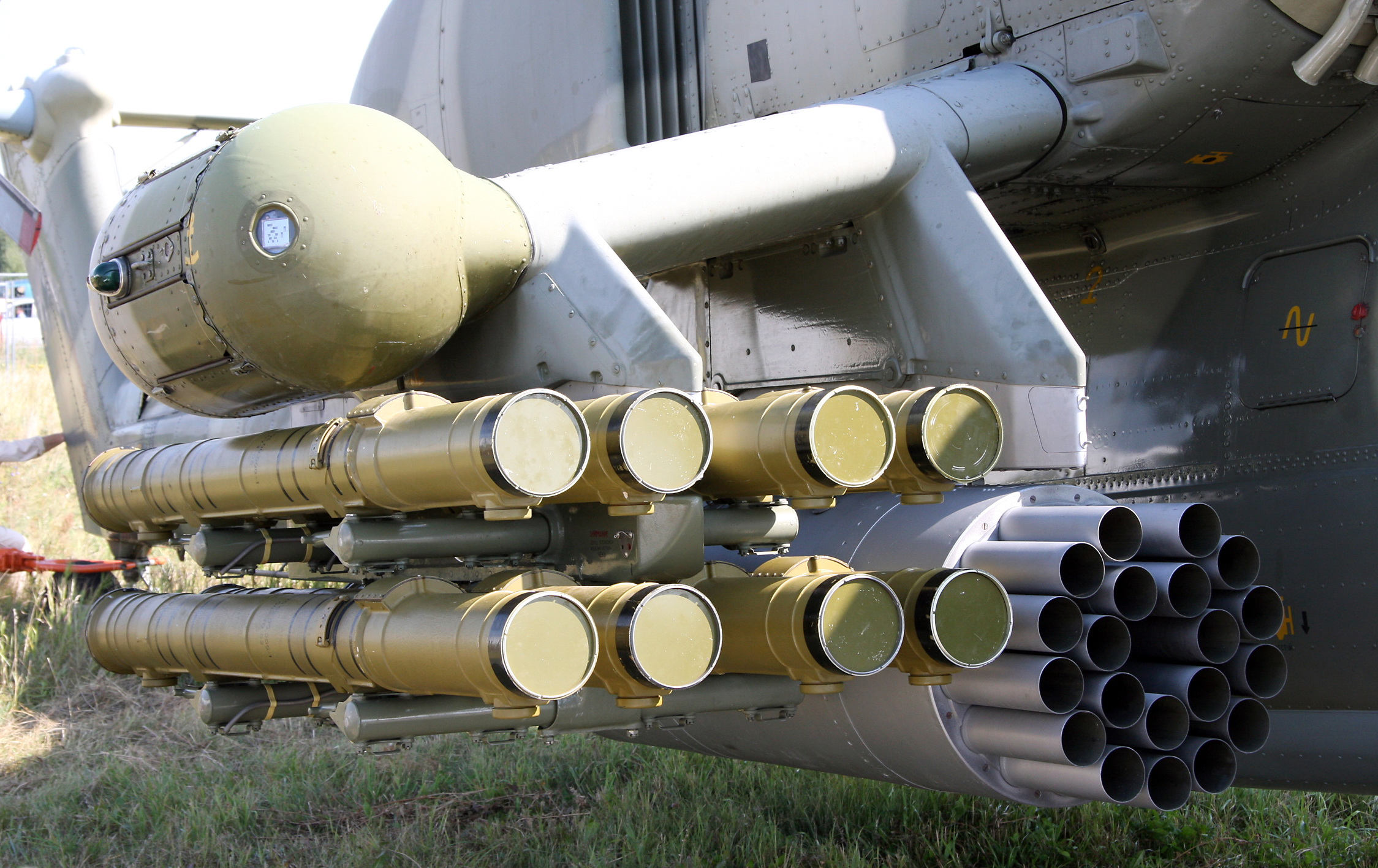
Mil Mi-28 weapons load

Mi-28
Prototype version; first flight in 1982.
Mi-28A
Original production anti-tank helicopter.
Mi-28N/MMW Havoc
All-weather day-night version adopted by the Russian military in 2009. Equipped with a top-mounted millimeter wave radar, thermographic camera-TV, and a laser rangefinder. Powered by two Russian Klimov TV3-117VMA-SB3 engines (2,500 hp each), produced by the Ukrainian Motor-Sich and replaced by Russian-made VK-2500 (2,699 hp each) engines as of 2016. Max takeoff weight: 11,500 kg, max payload: 2,350 kg.
Mi-28NE
Export version of the Mi-28N. In service with the Iraqi and Algerian Air Forces. In August 2018, the Russian Helicopters unveiled an upgraded Mi-28NE variant. The helicopter has enhanced armor and is fitted with modern directional IR countermeasures (DIRCM) against short-range IR guided missiles. Its rotor blades made of composite materials can withstand shells up to 20–30 mm, while the fuel system is to be fire and explosion resistant. It will be also capable to use the new 9M123 Khrizantema-VM anti-tank guided missiles (ATGMs).

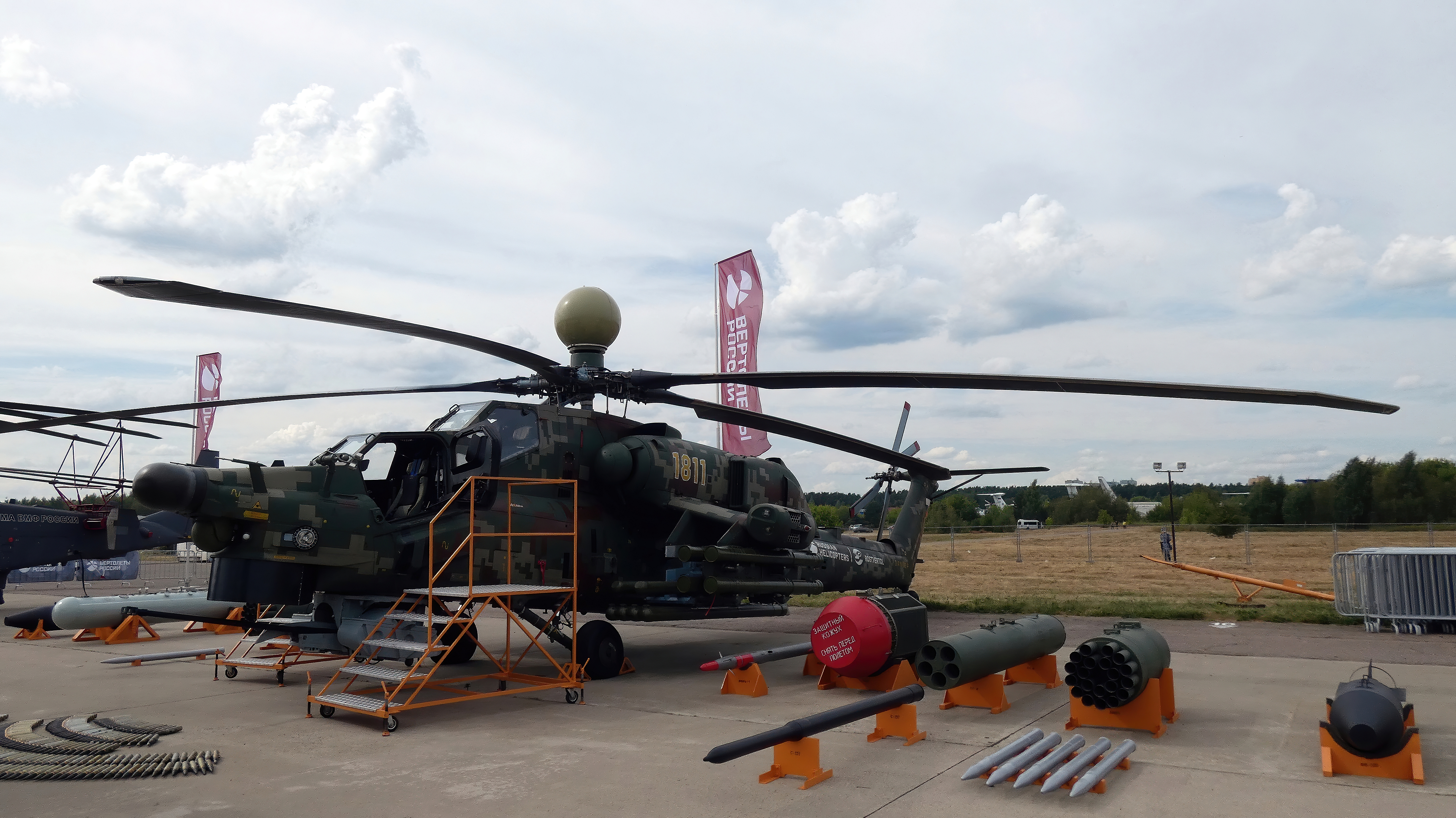
Mi-28NM on MAKS-2021

Mi-28NM
An upgraded version of the Mi-28N under development since 2009. It has a redesigned nose that lacks the nose antenna, a new H025 radar station for all-round visibility, more powerful VK-2500P engines with FADEC and improved rotor blades to increase its maximum speed by 13% and cruise speed by 10%. It also has an upgraded fire-control system and new "Izdeliye 296" onboard radio-electronic data processing system. It will be equipped to carry the 9M123VM Khrizantema and 9M127-1 Ataka-VM anti-tank missiles. It is also planned to be equipped with the new LMUR multipurpose missile, designed for use against air and ground targets, and fitted with inertial guidance in initial flight, with mid-course updates by an operator before the target is acquired by the missile's own seeker, giving a range of 25 km (16 mi). The Mi-28NM made its maiden flight in October 2016 and the state trials of the upgraded VK-2500P engines were completed in October 2020. A plan to upgrade existing Mi-28Ns to Mi-28NM standard has been approved.
Mi-28D
Simplified daylight operation version. Similar to Mi-28N, but without top-mounted radar and FLIR.
Mi-28UB
(Uchebno-Boyevoy, training-and-combat)
Mi-40
Projected utility version of the Mi-28, initiated in 1983 and announced in 1992. It was primarily intended for the "Aerial Infantry Fighting Vehicle" category as a successor to the Mil Mi-24 and Mi-8 assault helicopters. It was planned to use two 1,863 kW Klimov TV3-117 turboshaft engines, four-blade main rotor, four-blade Delta H tail rotor (both from the Mi-28), and retractable tricycle-type landing gear. It was expected to weigh 11–12,000 kg and estimated to attain a 3300 m ceiling, a 314 km/h maximum speed and a 260 km/h cruise speed. The specification required operating in day, night and poor weather conditions as well as carrying eight soldiers (the design achieved seven in practice), eight stretchers or large external loads. Emphasis was placed on survivability with a focus on redundancy, IR suppression and special shock absorbers for the crew to increase the maximum "safe" crash velocity. It incorporated a forward facing 23 mm rotary cannon (most likely GSh-23L) and a 12.7 mm heavy machine gun (most likely Yak-B) to the rear. Fuselage fairings containing fuel replaced stub wings with missiles mounted above on special hardpoints. Its design borrowed much from the Mil Mi-36 developed two years prior, and was itself soon replaced by the Mil Mi-42 project. Although the Mi-40 was briefly resurrected in the 1990s, with optimization studies being completed, it did not reach the prototype stage.

== Operators ==
Algeria

- Algerian Air Force - 42 Mi-28NE

Iraq

- Iraqi Army Aviation - 17 Mi-28NE

Iran

- Islamic Revolutionary Guard Corps Ground Forces Aviation - between 3 to 6 Mi-28NE as of February 2026

Russia

- Russian Air Force - 94 Mi-28N/NM, 98 on order. 19 Mi-28UB, 40 on order.

Uganda

- Ugandan Air Force - 4 Mi-28NE, 2 on order.

== Notable accidents ==
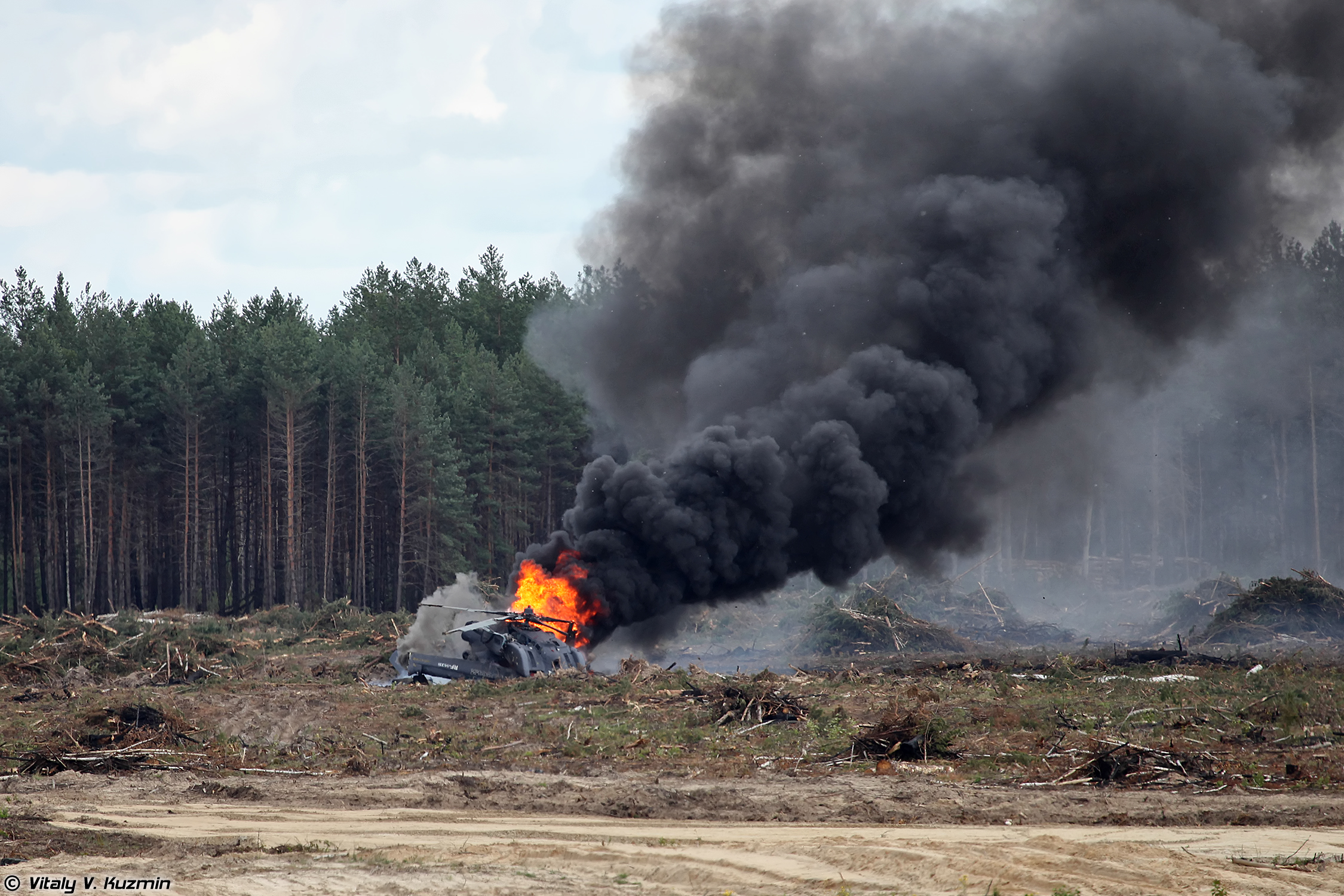
A Mil Mi-28 helicopter crashed on 2 August 2015 at Dubrovichi training range in Ryazan region.

- On 2 August 2015, an Mi-28 of the Berkut squadron crashed while performing in an aerobatics display with other helicopters in Ryazan. Of the crew, the pilot Lieutenant Colonel Igor Butenko died as a result of the crash, while the co-pilot Senior Lieutenant Alexander Kletnov survived. While the specific cause of the crash remains undetermined, the co-pilot indicated in his report that the aircraft suffered a hydraulic failure. As a result, the Russian military grounded all Mi-28s during the investigation.
- On 3 January 2024, a Ugandan Mi-28N crashed at Nyamisingiri Village, Kichwamba sub-county, Ntoroko district in the Democratic Republic of Congo (DRC) while deployed on a peacekeeping mission.
- On 18 March 2025, a Mi-28 crashed in a field in near the village of Shugovitsy, Leningrad oblast. The crash occurred during a training mission and killed both crew.

== Specifications ==
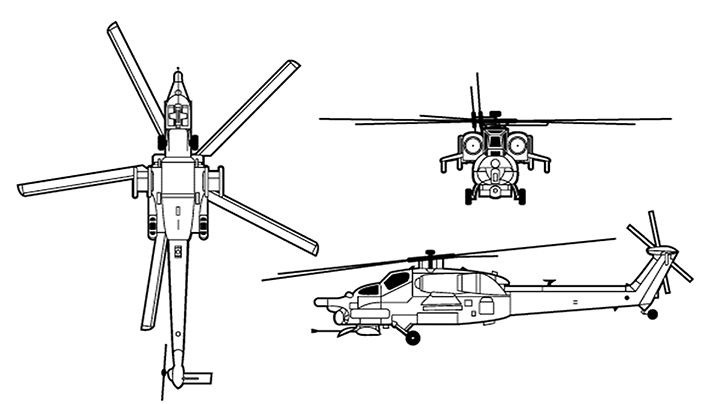

Data from RIA Novosti, Russian Helicopters, JSC, Jane's All The World's Aircraft 2000–2001

General characteristics

- Crew: 2 (1 pilot, 1 WSO)
- Length: 17.01 m (55 ft 10 in) excluding rotors
- Wingspan: 4.88 m (16 ft 0 in) stub wings
- Height: 3.82 m (12 ft 6 in) to top of rotor head
- Empty weight: 8,590 kg (18,938 lb) equipped
- Gross weight: 10,700 kg (23,589 lb)
- Max takeoff weight: 11,500 kg (25,353 lb)
- Fuel capacity: 1,337 kg (2,948 lb) / 1,720 L (450 US gal; 380 imp gal) internal fuel + up to 445 kg (981 lb) / 571 L (151 US gal; 126 imp gal) in 4x drop tanks
- Powerplant: 2 × Klimov VK-2500 turboshaft engines, 1,636 kW (2,194 hp) each
- Main rotor diameter: 17.2 m (56 ft 5 in)
- Main rotor area: 232.35 m^{2} (2,501.0 sq ft)

Performance

- Maximum speed: 320 km/h (200 mph, 170 kn)
- Cruise speed: 270 km/h (170 mph, 150 kn) max
- Range: 435 km (270 mi, 235 nmi) with 5% reserve
- Combat range: 200 km (120 mi, 110 nmi) 10-minute loiter with 5% reserve
- Ferry range: 1,100 km (680 mi, 590 nmi) 4x drop tanks with 5% reserve
- Endurance: 2 hours
- Service ceiling: 5,700 m (18,700 ft)
- Hover ceiling OGE: 3,600 m (11,811 ft)
- g limits: +3 -0.5
- Rate of climb: 13.6 m/s (2,680 ft/min) max at sea level
- Disk loading: 49.5 kg/m^{2} (10.1 lb/sq ft) max
- Power/mass: 0.31 kW/kg (0.19 hp/lb)

Armament

- Guns: 1× chin-mounted 30 mm Shipunov 2A42 cannon with 250 rounds (±110° horizontal fire)
- Hardpoints: Two pylons under each stub wing to mount bombs, rockets, missiles, and gun pods. Main armament configurations include:
  - 16 Ataka-V anti-tank missiles and 40 S-8 rockets, or
  - 16 Ataka-V anti-tank missiles, and 10 S-13 rocket, or
  - 16 Ataka-V anti-tank missiles, and two 23 mm UPK-23-250 gun pods each containing a GSh-23L with 250 rounds.
  - Other ordnance: 9K121 Vikhr, and 9M123 Khrizantema anti-tank missiles (9M123VM variant for any Mi-28 variant have fire-control radar, with bonus of millimeter-wave radar ACLOS missile guidance), LMUR, 8 Igla-V and Vympel R-73 air-to-air missiles, 2 KMGU-2 mine dispensers, and a variant of 9K333 Verba air-to-air missile

== See also ==
Related development

- Kamov Ka-50/Ka-52
- Mil Mi-24

Aircraft of comparable role, configuration, and era

- AgustaWestland Apache
- Changhe Z-10
- Harbin Z-21
- Kamov Ka-52 Alligator
- Bell AH-1Z Viper
- Boeing AH-64 Apache

Related lists

- List of active Russian military aircraft
