= Berkuts =

Berkuts (Golden Eagles)
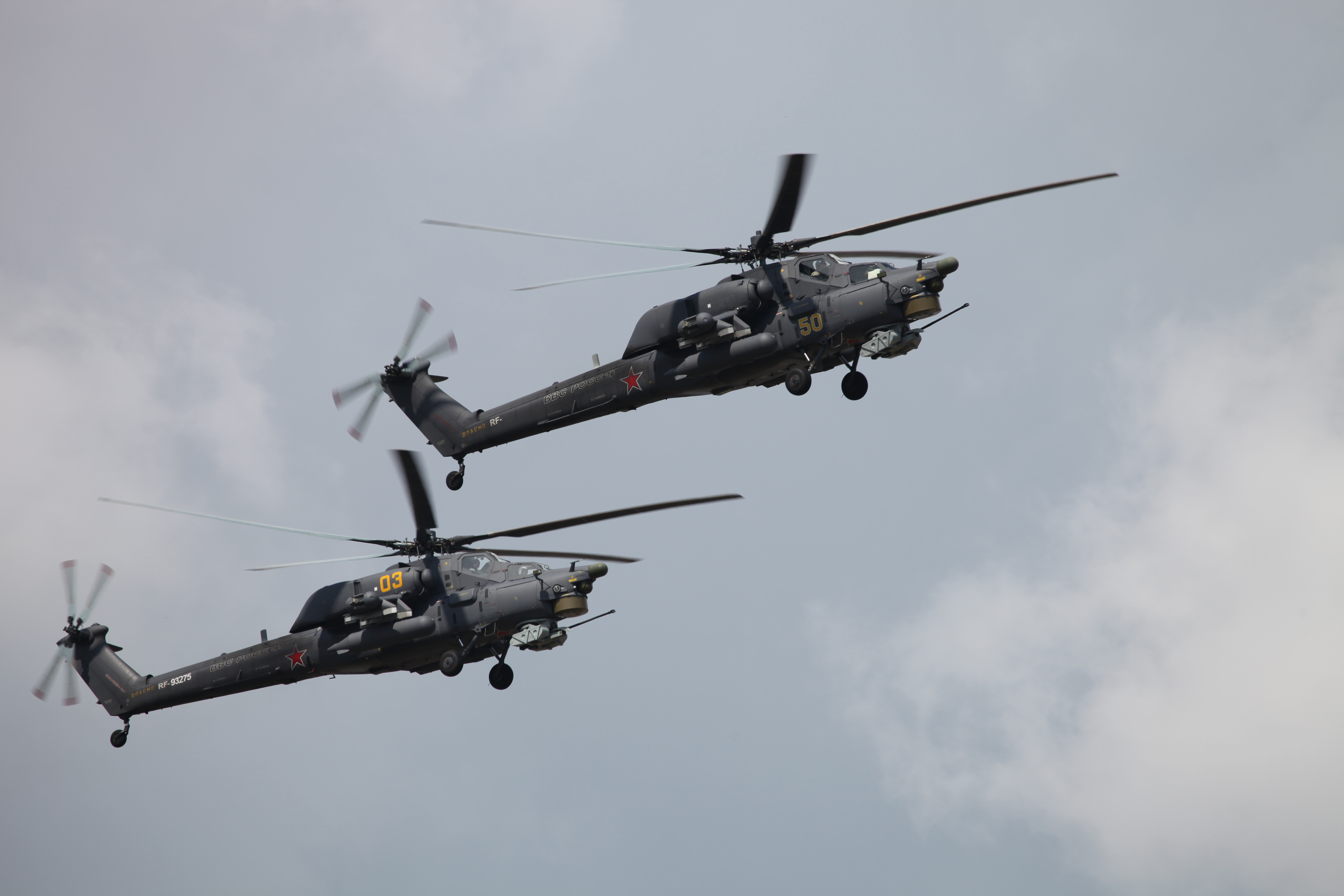
- Two Mi-28N from the Berkuti aerobatics team
- Active: 1992 to the present
- Country: Russian Federation
- Branch: Russian Air Force
- Role: Aerobatic display team
- Garrison/HQ: Torzhok aviation center Tver Oblast, Russia
- Colors: Black

Aircraft flown
- Attack helicopter: 6 Mil Mi-28

The Berkuts (English: Golden eagles) are a Soviet and later Russian aerobatic performance demonstrator team connected with the Russian Air Force.

== History ==
The Berkuti were founded as a helicopter aerobatic team in 1992 and used first four, later six, Mil Mi-24 of different versions. The helicopters were painted in the usual camouflage colors, however, had at the height of the cockpit starting a lightning-shaped strip of over the whole length of the hull in the Russian national colors (White, Blue, Red). And on the righthand side area of the cockpit the team emblem. The Berkuti changed to six Mil Mi-28N combat helicopters. On August 2 2015 at the end of the flight demonstration at Ryazan a helicopter of the Berkuti teams crashed down and caught fire. One pilot was rescued while the other pilot was killed. The reason for failure was seen in the hydraulic system and led to a temporarily grounding of the whole Mi-28 fleet. However, already at the MAKS Airshow end of August 2015, the team showed again its air display show. The three teams Berkuti, Russian Knights/Russkiye Vityazi and Swifts/Strizhi belong to the standard teams at the MAKS (air show) and the victory parades in Moscow.

== See also ==
- Soviet air shows
