= S-5 rocket =

Soviet family of air-launched rockets

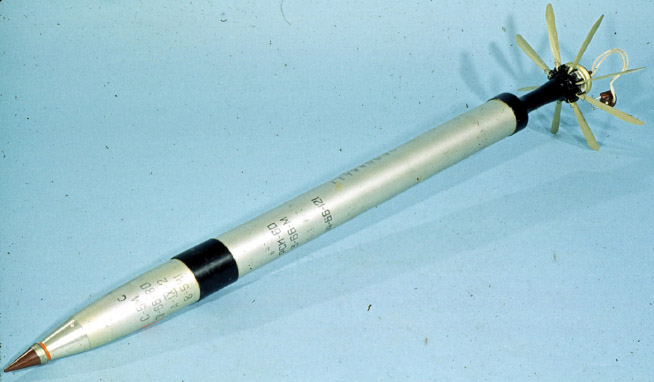
An S-5M rocket. It has a sharper nose than the original S-5 rocket and the fins do not fold back as far.

A cross section of an S-5M rocket

The S-5 (first designated ARS-57) is a rocket weapon developed by the Soviet Air Force and used by military aircraft against ground area targets. It is in service with the Russian Aerospace Forces and various export customers. It is based on the R4M, a German design from World War 2.

It is produced in a variety of sub-types with different warheads, including HEAT anti-armour (S-5K), high-explosive fragmentation (S-5M/MO), smoke, and incendiary rounds. Each rocket is about 1.4 meters (4 feet 7 inches) long and weighs about 5 kg (11 lb), depending on warhead and fuze. Range is 3 to 4 kilometres (1.9 to 2.5 mi).

== Development ==
In 1946 the Soviet Nudelman Precision Engineering Design Bureau (then designated OKB-16) undertook technical research of unguided air to air missiles in aircraft armament. As part of the bureaus research, captured examples of the German 55mm R4M "Orkan" (Engl: Hurricane) unguided air to air missile were closely studied. After 5 years, the Soviet ministry of defense finally provided official status and funding of the project in 1951, originally as part of the air-to-air AS-5 weapon system for the MiG-19. The rockets were tested in a series of configurations on MiG-15bis and MiG-17 jets, with the final tests complete on a MiG-17PF in January 1955. The tests revealed that the rockets did not perform as expected against aerial targets. The rocket ARS-57 was accepted into service in April 1955, with a military designation S-5.

In addition to the Soviet Union and then Russia, S-5 rockets were produced among others in Poland. As of 2013, the only remaining producers were Belarus and Bulgaria.

=== S-5U ===
In late 2019, Russia announced it would resume production of the S-5 rocket for the first time since production ceased in 1990. The improved S-5U is 1,090 mm (3.58 ft) long and weighs 6 kg (13 lb), making it longer and heavier than the previous S-5M, though it is compatible with older rocket pods. It runs on composite propellant rather than a solid fuel motor and is spin-stabilized through four curved fins wrapped around the rocket nozzle to match its diameter when stored. Effective range remains between 0.5–4 km (0.31–2.49 mi), but lethality is increased by a heavier 0.8 kg (1.8 lb) warhead. It features a universal warhead that can penetrate 150 mm (5.9 in) of armor, explode into 500 2 g (0.071 oz) splinters, and has incendiary elements; combat efficiency is claimed to be comparable to the S-8 rocket.

== Description ==
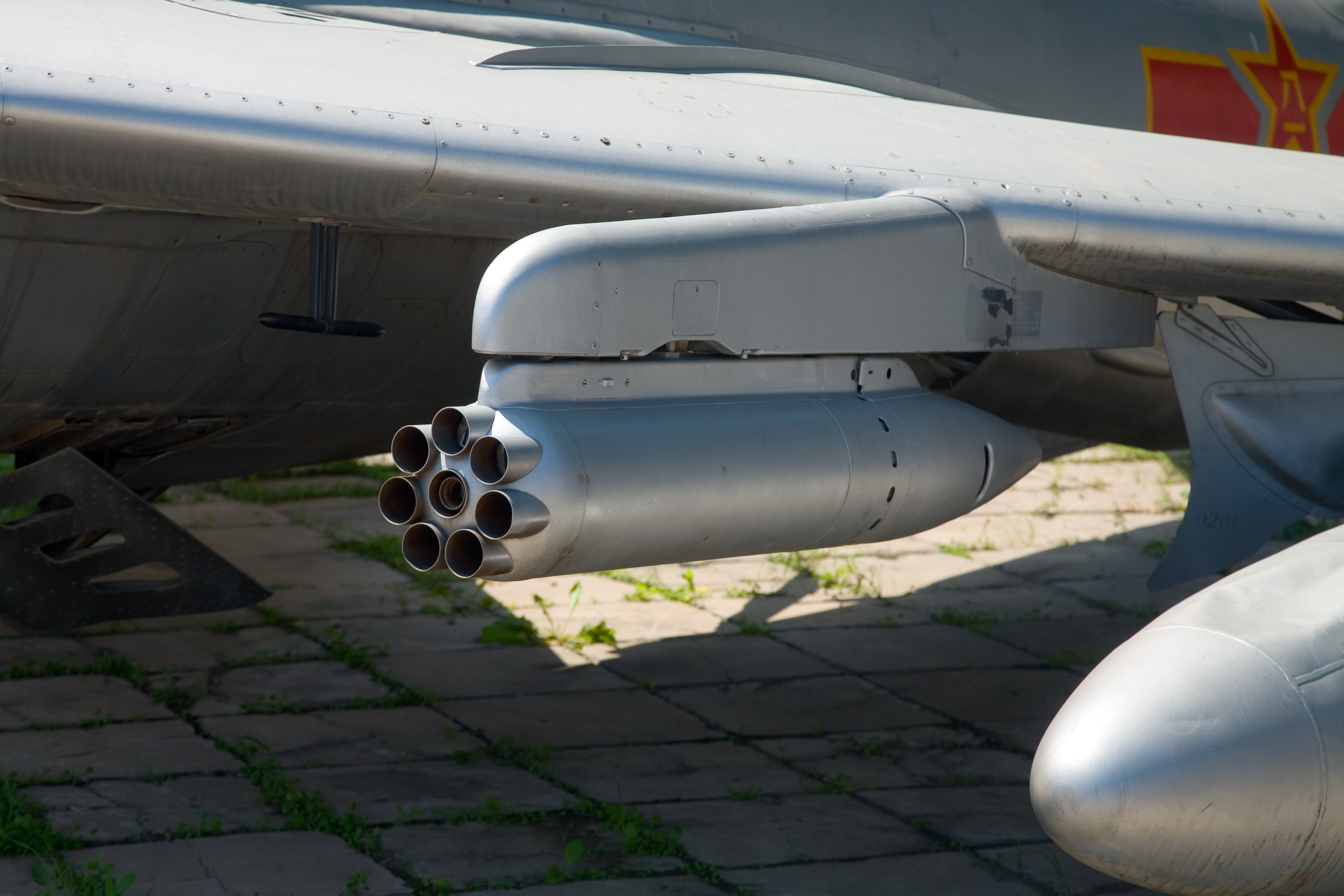
ORO-57K launcher under MiG-19/F-6

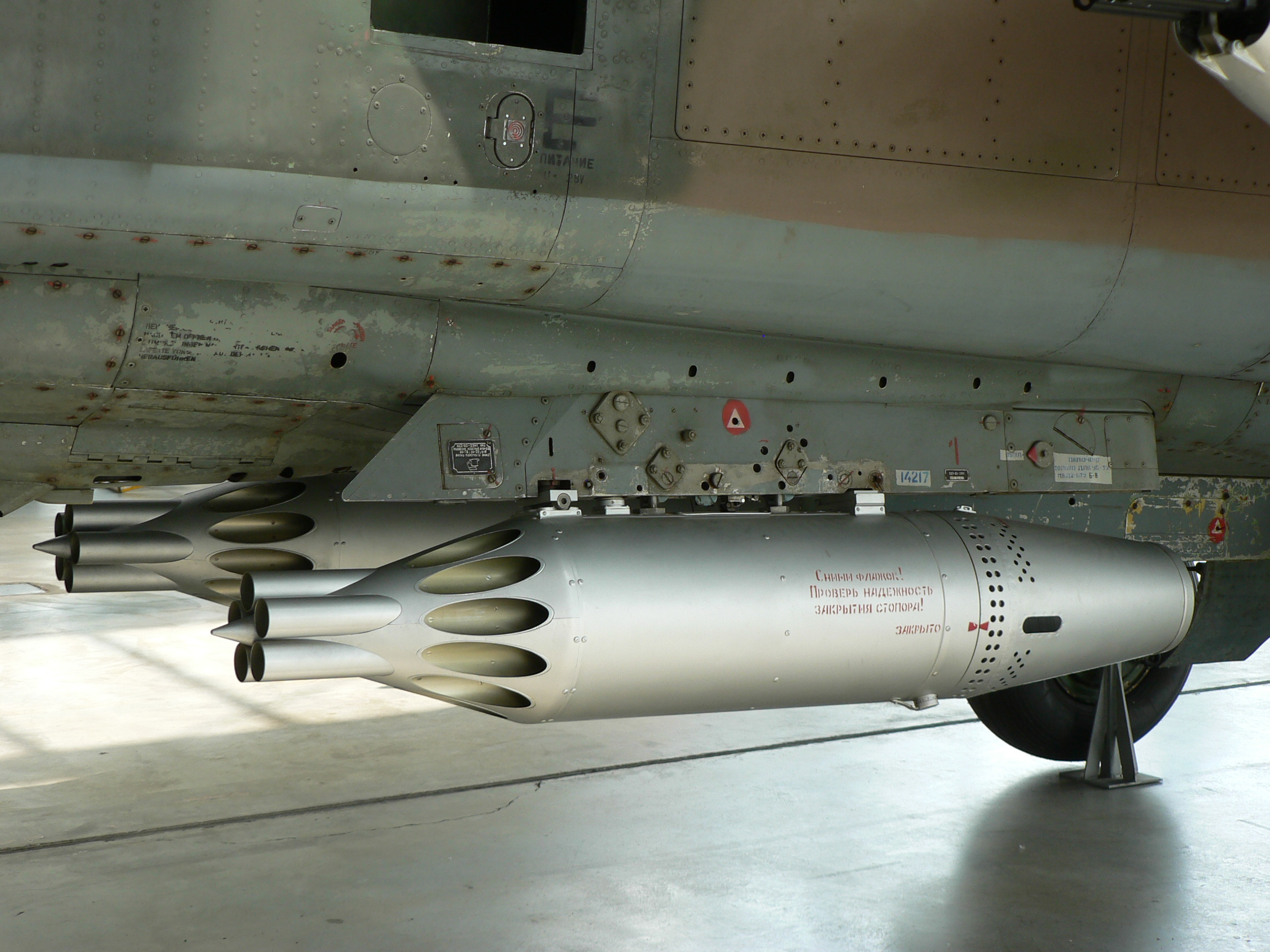
UB-16-57UMP launchers under MiG-23

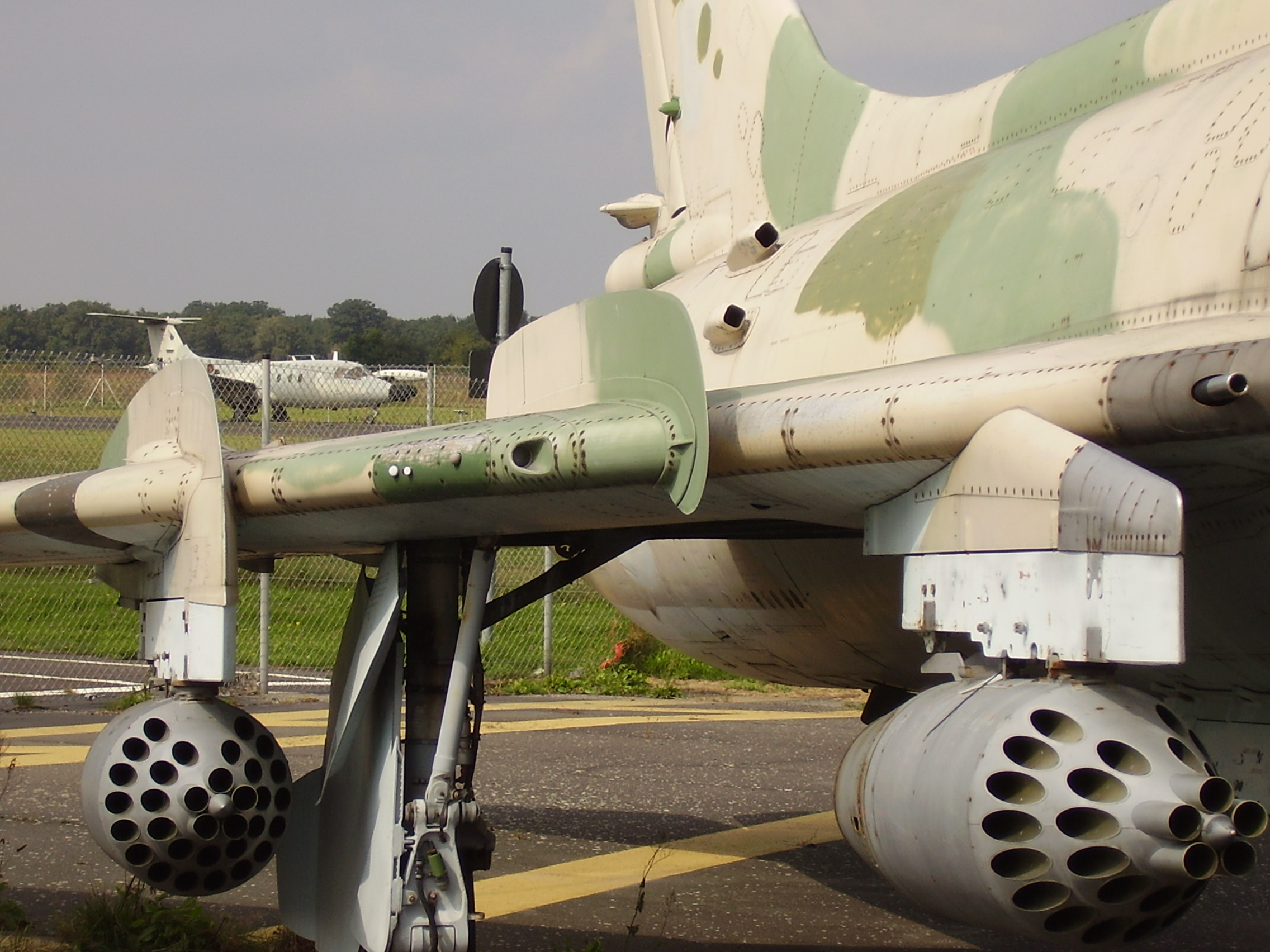
Su-20 with UB-32 rocket launchers

The S-5 is a 55 mm (2.2 in) calibre unguided rocket fired from a 57 mm calibre tube. It is used by fighter bombers and helicopters. It consists of a steel body containing a solid fuel rocket, and a high-explosive warhead with a mechanical impact fuse. At the rear of the rocket is an elongated exhaust nozzle, with eight attached forward folding fins. The fins fold around the rocket when it is stowed in its launch tube; they spring back as soon as the rocket leaves the launch tube. In flight, the very slightly angled fins exert a stabilizing spin to the rocket, turning at approximately 750 rpm. The solid rocket motor burns for just 1.1 seconds, during which time it covers about 300 meters (980 feet).

The S-5 is carried in rocket pods, with between four and 32 rockets. The first were ORO-57 launchers, made in variants with capacity of four, eight and 16 rockets. The most typical became the ORO-57K for eight rockets, used especially on the MiG-19. Then, beginning in the early 1960s, the typical launcher became the UB-16-57, with 16 rockets, developed in several variants, for helicopters and planes. UB stands for "universal block" (universalnyi blok), as it could be carried on conventional bomb hardpoints, "57" refers to the actual diameter of the launch tube (the diameter of the rocket plus 2 mm). The first variant and UB-16-57U had a conical forward part while the next variant UB-16-57D had a blunt forward part. Starting in 1968, the UB-16-57UMP variant was produced, with a conical forward part and five protruding inner tubes. In the 1970s, the UB-32 was developed with 32 rockets, carried by heavier aircraft.

In Poland, the Mars-2 launcher for 16 rockets was developed in variants for Lim-6bis aircraft and Mi-2URN helicopters. In Romania, the LPR 57 launcher for 16 rockets was developed.

== Operational history ==
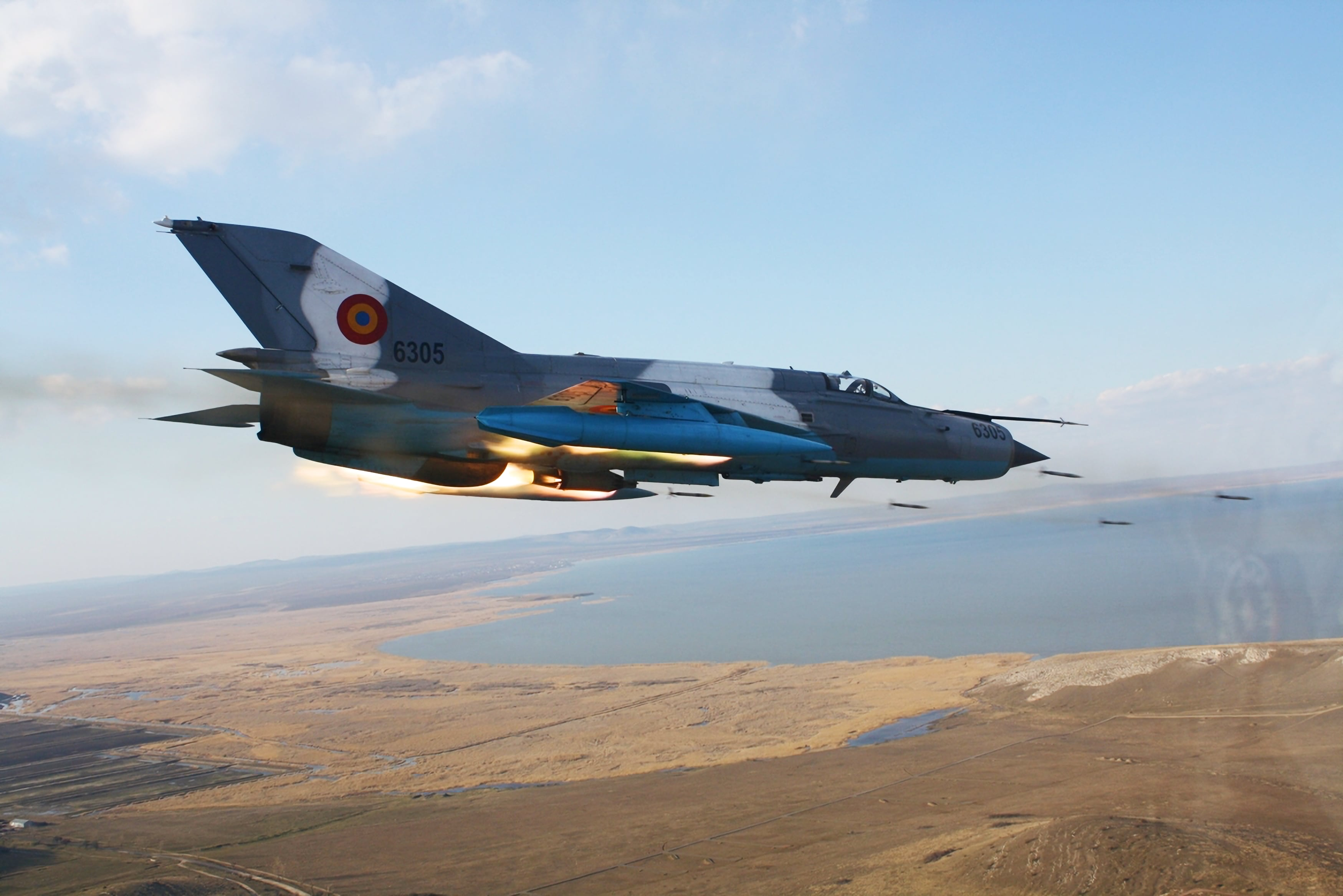
MiG-21 Lancer firing S-5 rockets

=== Afghanistan ===
S-5 rockets were used extensively by Sukhoi Su-25 and Mil Mi-24 aircraft in Afghanistan in the 1980s, where their effectiveness was considered poor. Pilots described the rockets fanning out after launch "like a tulip", and that the warhead was only good for "tickling the dookhi's (mujahedeen) heels". The Russian forces have shifted to higher-calibre weapons like the S-8 rocket instead. In addition the Soviet 40th Army made use of improvised launchers mounted on T-62 tanks, BTR-70 APCs and Ural-4320 trucks in a ground-to-ground role.

=== Chechnya ===
S-5 and S-8 rockets were used in the First Chechen War and the Second Chechen War. These rockets were then salvaged by Chechen fighters to be used as anti-tank rocket launcher in their “Shaitan” homemade weapons. Such weapons were unpredictable, as some were made from gear shafts of Russian trucks. Also such rockets were damaged during their capture. These rockets were taken from downed Mil-24 helicopters.

=== India ===
IAF MiG-21 firing its S-5 rockets over East Pakistan, 1971

During the 1971 Bangladesh Liberation War, four of the Indian Air Force's MiG-21FLs led by Wing Commander Bhupendra Kumar Bishnoi fired their S-5 rockets on the East Pakistani Governor's mansion in Dhaka, leading to the governor resigning immediately thereafter the attack. On 13 December, an IAF MiG-21 shot down a Pakistani F-104 Starfighter from its Ub-16 rocket pods, which fired its S-5 rockets.

=== Israel ===
On Sunday, 6 January 2009, The Israel Defense Forces claimed they identified a rocket fired at Israel earlier in the day by Al-Qassam Brigades in the Gaza Strip as a Russian-made S5K.

According to the IDF, the rocket fired at Kibbutz Alumim in the Negev marked the first time Izz ad-Din al-Qassam Brigades have used this type of weapon.

Although the weapon is intended to be launched aerially, Al-Qassam forces chose to launch their rocket from ground-based launchers. Unlike a Qassam rocket, the S5K contains more explosives, but is less precise.

On Friday, 8 December 2017, two S-5 rockets fired from the Gaza Strip landed on Sderot.

On May 16, 2024, Hezbollah fired an S-5 rocket from a UAV on an Israeli military base.

=== Libya ===
The S-5, along with S-8 and S-13 rockets, has been deployed from the backs of pick-up trucks (generally, technicals) during the 2011 Libyan civil war, serving as a makeshift MLRS. UB-16 and UB-32 pods were used in this role. The rebels have also developed a man-portable launcher for the S-5, turning the rocket into a makeshift RPG round.

=== Pakistan ===
The 57mm S-5 rockets were used by the Pakistan Air Force with their Shenyang F-6s against Indian ground targets at Shakargarh sector during the Battle of Shakargarh in 1971. In total, 188 rockets were fired from the F-6s ORO-57K launcher.

=== Syria ===
The S-5 has seen use by the Syrian Air Force against opposition forces in the Syrian civil war. It has also been used as an improvised ground-launched rocket, fired from UB-16 or UB-32 pods.

=== Ukraine ===
The 57mm rockets were used during Russian invasion of Ukraine as improvised ground-launched MLRS (multiple launch rocket system) by the Ukrainians. On 18 June 2023, a Russian BTR-80 APC that had two UB-32 rocket pods attached to it was sighted and damaged by loitering drones. In 2026, FP-2 drones equipped with 8 rockets began being used.

== Launcher characteristics ==
=== ORO-57K ===
- rockets: 8
- length × diameter: 1,447 × 220 mm
- weight, empty: 33 kg
- weight, loaded: 74 kg
- launch platform: MiG-19/F-6

=== UB-16-57 ===
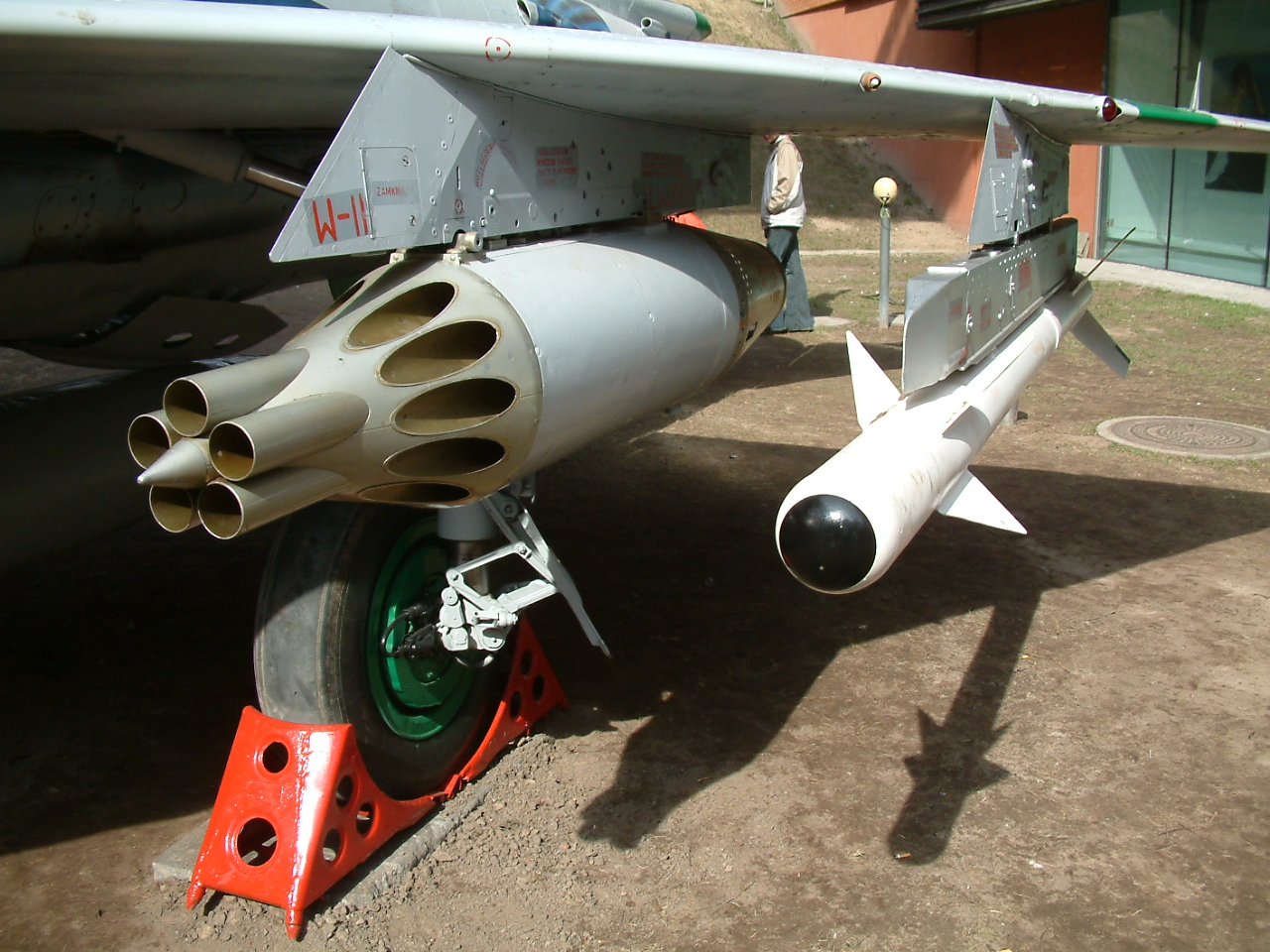
MiG-21MF with R-3S air-to-air missile and UB-16 launcher with S-5 rockets.

Sources:

- rockets: 16
- length × diameter: 1,880 × 335 mm
- weight, empty: 57 kg
- weight, loaded: 138 kg
- reusable: yes
- launch platforms: MiG-21, Su-7, Mi-8, improvised mountings on armoured vehicles and technicals (various variants of UB-16-57)

=== UB-32 ===
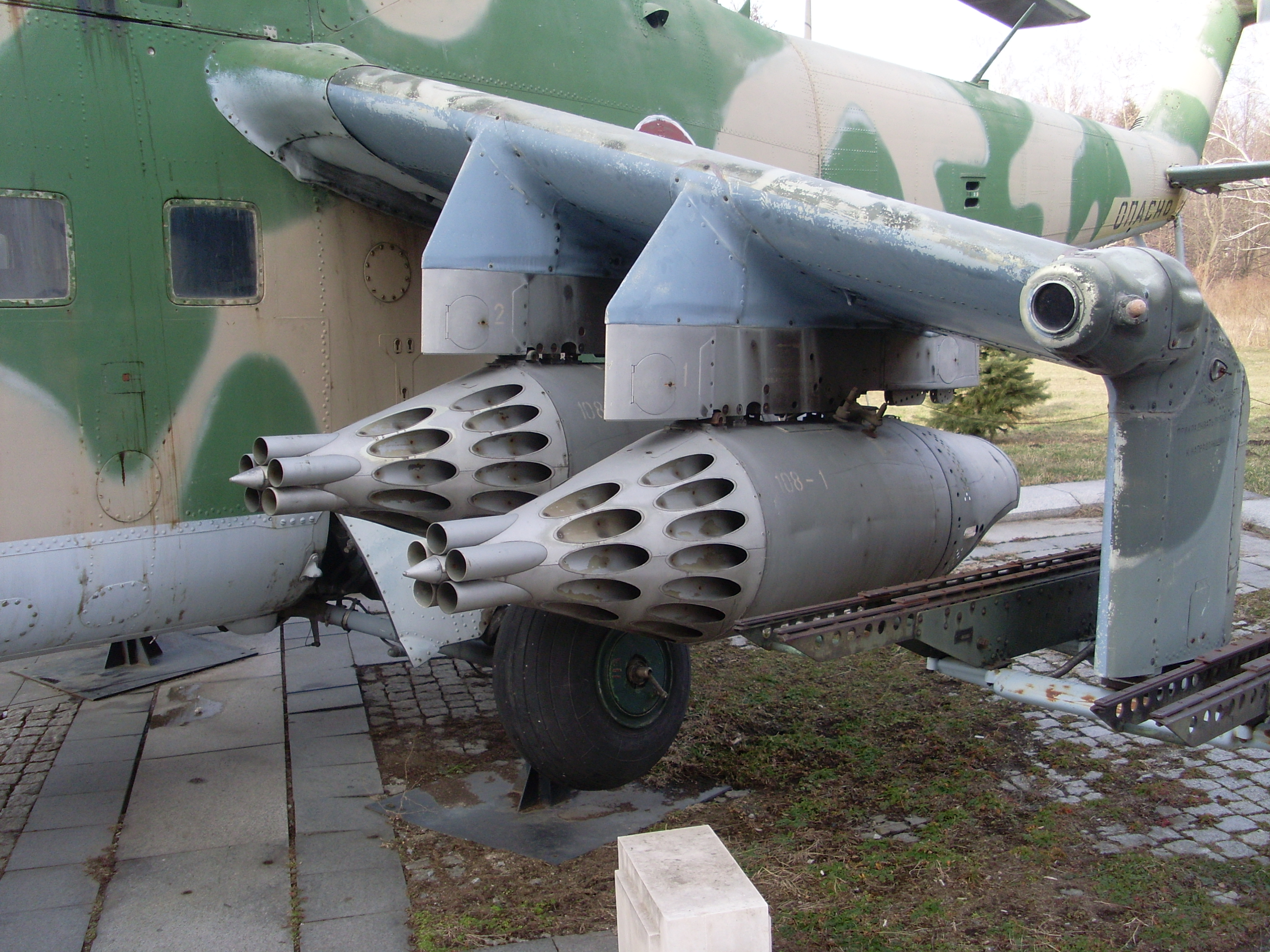
A pair of UB-32 pods under the wingtip of a Mil Mi-24 helicopter

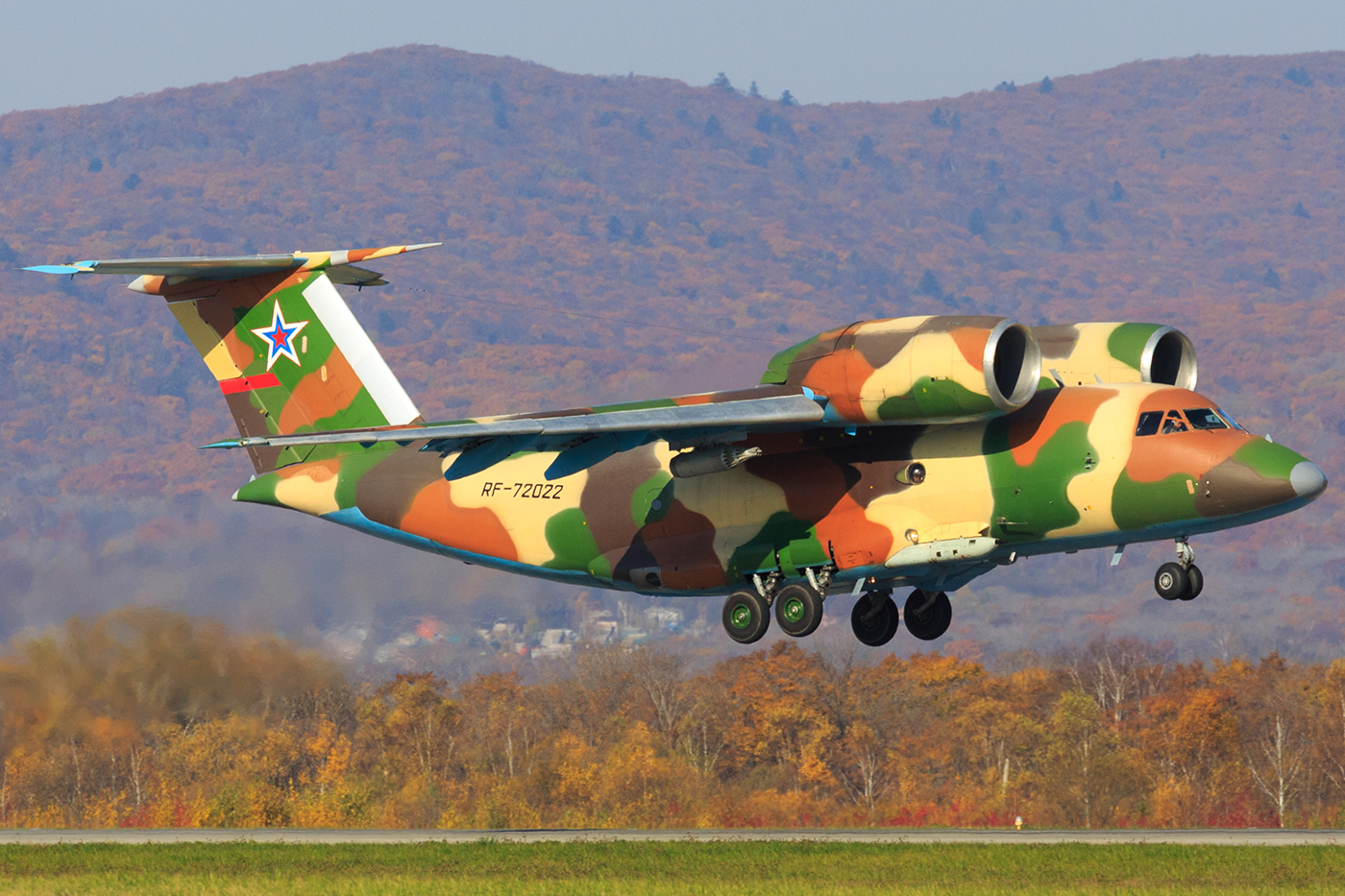
UB-32 launcher under the wing of an Antonov An-72P patrol aircraft

Sources:

- rockets: 32
- length × diameter: 2,080 × 481 mm
- weight, empty: 103 kg
- weight, loaded: 264 kg
- reusable: yes
- launch platforms: MiG-21, MiG-23, MiG-27, Su-7, Su-17/20/22, Su-25, An-72P, Mi-8/17, Mi-24, improvised mountings on armoured vehicles and technicals

== Rocket specifications ==
| Designation | Type | Length overall | Launch weight | Warhead weight | Notes |
|---|---|---|---|---|---|
| S-5/ARS-57 | GP | 0.915 m | 3.99 kg | 1.16 kg | Impact fuze. 3.5 mrad dispersion. |
| S-5M | HE-FRAG | ? | ? | ? | Produces 75 splinters |
| S-5M1 | HE-FRAG | 0.882 m | 3.86 kg | 0.8 kg | Produces 75 splinters |
| S-5MO | Frag | 0.998 m | 4.82 kg | 0.8 kg | Warhead has 20 notched steel rings generate 360 fragments. |
| S-5K | HEAT | ? | ? | ? | Shaped charge warhead, 130 mm versus RHA. |
| S-5K1 | HEAT | 0.83 m | 3.64 kg | 1.1 kg | Shaped charge warhead, 130 mm versus RHA. |
| S-5KO | HEAT / FRAG | 0.987 m | 4.43 kg | 1.36 kg | Warhead has 11 notched steel rings, 220 fragments. |
| S-5KOB | HEAT / FRAG | 0.987 m | 4.43 kg | 1.36 kg | Warhead has 11 notched steel rings, 220 fragments. Code "B" for uses new type BN-K low smoke motor powder. |
| S-5KP | HEAT / FRAG | 1.079 m | 5.01 kg | 1.8 kg | Shaped charge with wound wire fragmentation jacket and sensitive piezoelectric impact fuze. Improved warhead with 250 mm RHA penetration. |
| S-5KPB | HEAT / FRAG | 1.079 m | 5.01 kg | 1.8 kg | Shaped charge with wound wire fragmentation jacket and sensitive piezoelectric impact fuze. Improved warhead with 250 mm RHA penetration. Code "B" for uses new type BN-K low smoke motor powder. |
| S-5S | Flechette | ? | ? | ? | Warhead contains 1,000 to 1,100 40 mm long flechettes. |
| S-5SB | Flechette | ? | ? | ? | Warhead contains 1,000 to 1,100 40 mm long flechettes. Code "B" for uses new type BN-K low smoke motor powder. |
| S-5P (PARS-57) | Chaff | ? | ? | n/a | Chaff rocket |
| S-5P1 | Chaff | 1.073 m | 5.04 kg | n/a | Chaff rocket. |
| S-5-O | Flare | ? | ? | ? | Flare / illumination |
| S-5-O1 | Paraflare | 0.948 m | 4.94 kg | 1.73 kg | Parachute flare. |
| S-5Kor | Guided | 1.100 m | 5.85 kg. | - | 200 mm RHA penetration. 0.8–1.8 m CEP accuracy. |

== See also ==
- RS-82 rocket
- S-8 rocket
- Ugroza, a proposed upgrade of "dumb" rockets to salvo-fired laser-guided precision missiles

== Bibliography ==
- Soviet/Russian Aircraft Weapons Since World War Two, Yefim Gordon, ISBN 1-85780-188-1
- Mil Mi-24 Hind Attack Helicopter, Yefim Gordon and Dimitri Komissarov, ISBN 1-84037-238-9
- Jane's Air Launched Weapons Issue 36, Duncan Lennox, ISBN 0-7106-0866-7
- Lyamin, Yuri; Jenzen-Jones, N.R. (2014). Improvised Employment of S-5 Air-To-Surface Rockets in Land Warfare: A Brief History and Technical Appraisal (PDF). Armaments Research Services. ISBN 978-0-9924624-0-6.
