= Rocket (weapon) =

Weapon utilizing a self-contained rocket engine to propel itself to its target

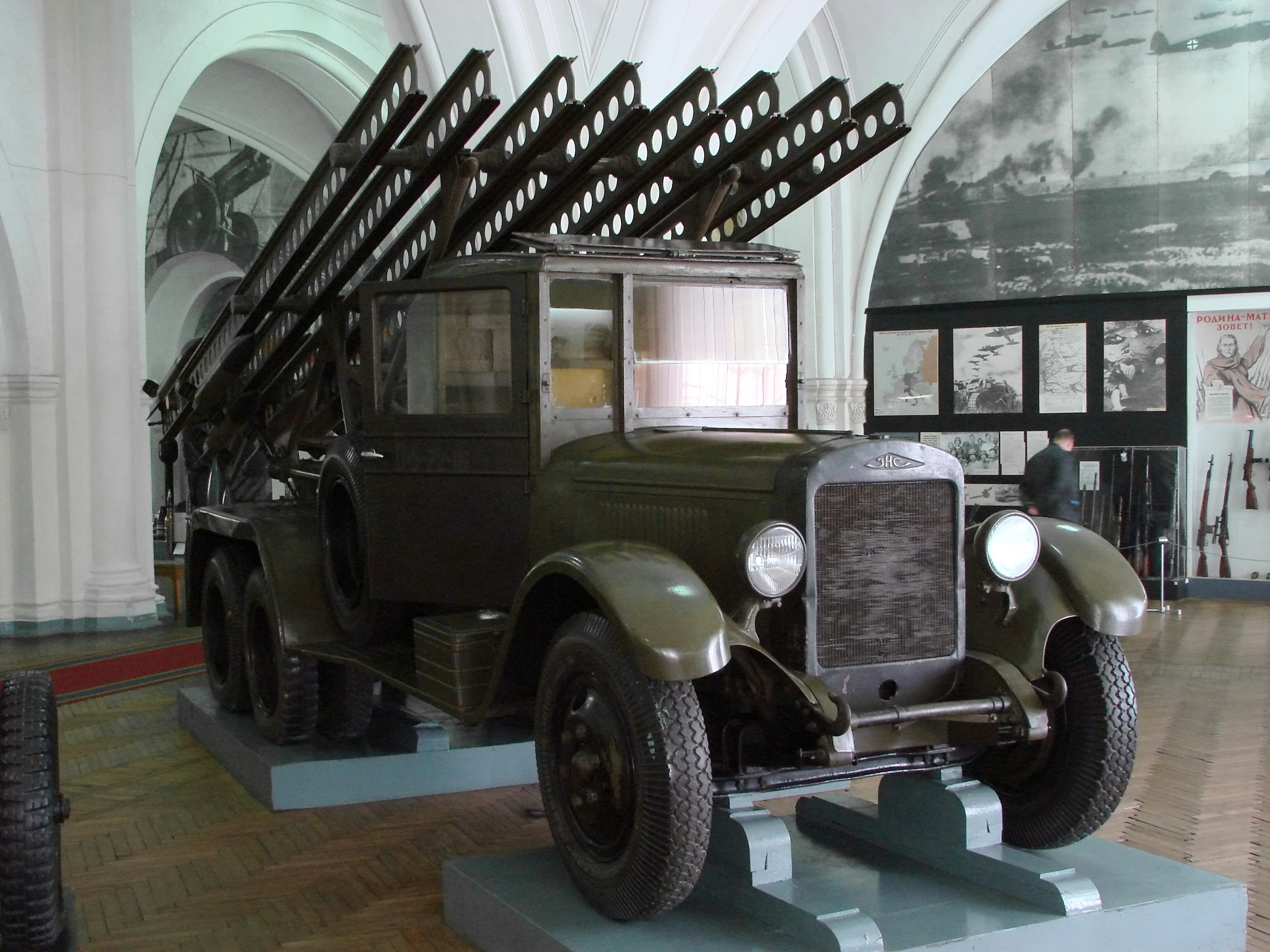
Katyusha rocket launcher, one of the earliest modern rocket-artillery weapons

In military terminology, a rocket is a self-propelled, unguided or guided, weapon-system powered by a rocket engine. Though used primarily as medium- and long-range artillery systems, historically rockets have also seen considerable use as air-to-surface weapons, some use as air-to-air weapons, and even (in a few cases) as surface-to-air devices. Examples of modern surface-to-surface rocket systems include the Soviet BM-27 Uragan and the American M270 Multiple Launch Rocket System.

In military parlance, a rocket differs from a missile primarily by lacking an active guidance system; early missiles became known as "guided rockets" or "guided missiles". Some rockets were developed as unguided systems and later upgraded to guided versions, like the GMLRS, and these generally retain the term "rocket" instead of becoming "missiles". Rockets or missiles that travel underwater, like the VA-111 Shkval, are known as "torpedoes", whatever their propulsion system.

== Early development ==
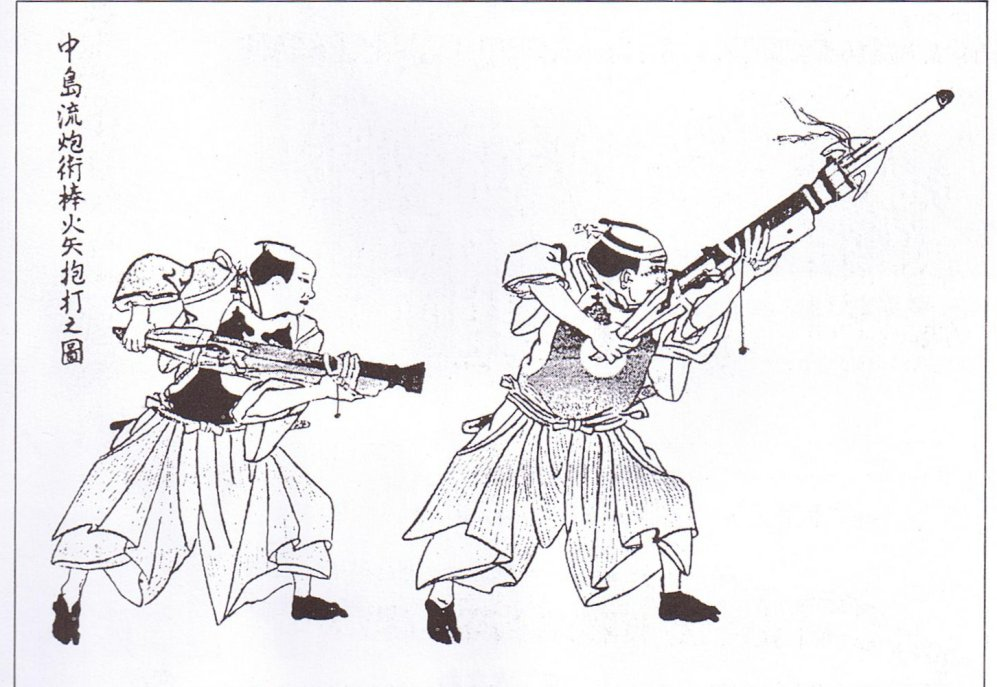
An Edo period wood block print showing samurai gunners firing bo-hiya with hiya-zutsu (fire arrow guns).

The use of rockets as some form of artillery dates back to medieval China where devices such as fire arrows were used (albeit mostly as a psychological weapon), and gradually spread to the Middle East, Europe and South Asia. Rockets became a significant weapon during the 20th century when precise manufacturing processes made relatively accurate rockets possible.

In the late 18th century, iron-cased rockets were used by Kingdom of Mysore Mysorean rockets and by Marathas during the mid 18th century, and were later modified and used by the British. The later models and improvements were known as the Congreve rocket and used in the Napoleonic Wars.

== Basic roles ==
=== Artillery ===
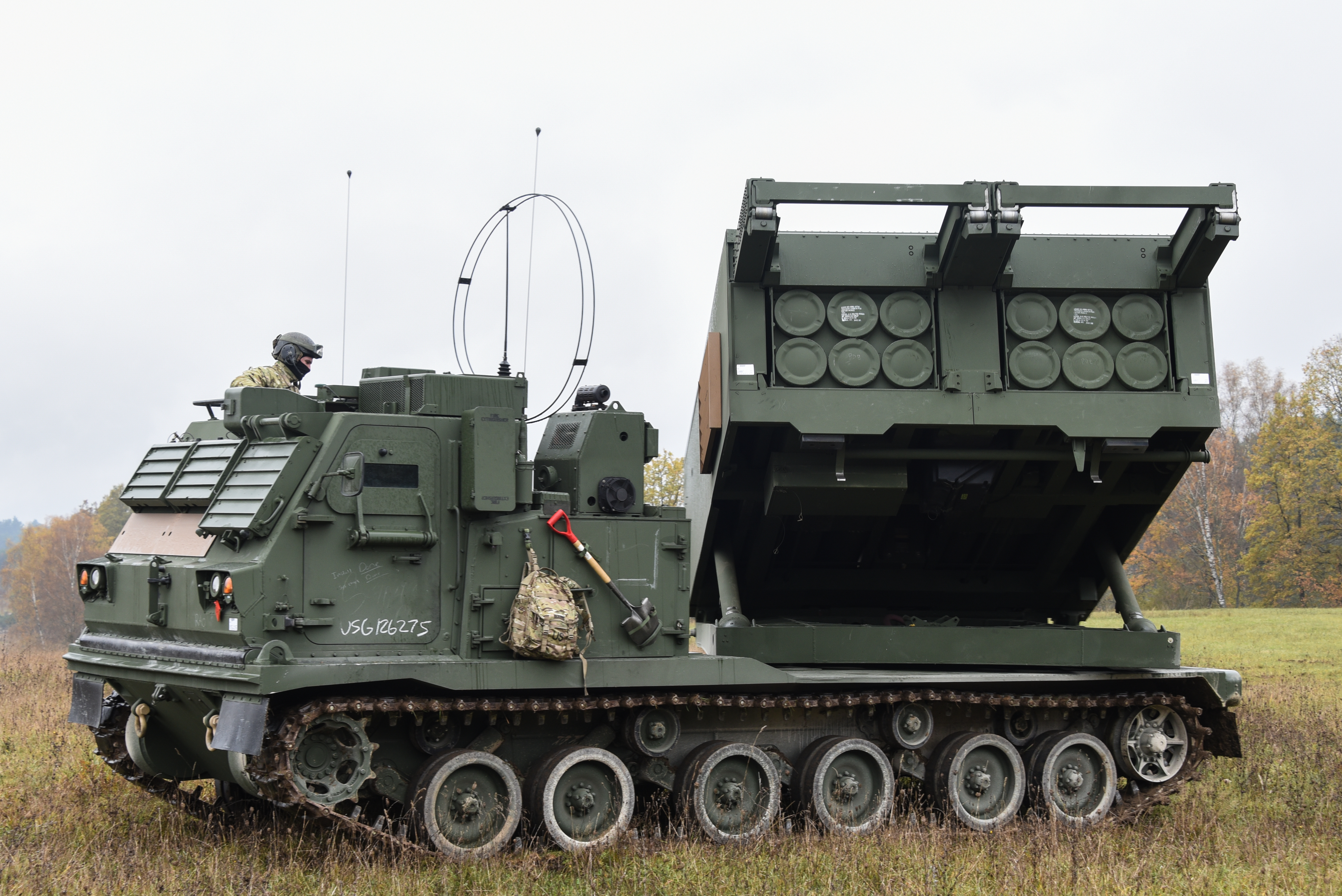
M270 MLRS

Rockets have been used as an artillery weapon for centuries, and continue to be used in the modern age after being extensively modernized in World War II. Rockets in the artillery role complement traditional field guns, being superior in some ways and inferior in others. Rocket artillery tends to be simpler, lighter and more mobile than guns or howitzers, most of which must be emplaced. Guns tend to have better accuracy, consistency, and range, while rocket artillery is light enough to be employed closer to the front lines and excels at saturation fire, expending its entire ammunition load in a single barrage on a target. The saturation fire produced by rocket artillery is only somewhat approximated in effectiveness with gun artillery via the time on target barrage method.

Time-sensitive soft target interdiction (such as personnel or unarmored vehicles moving in large groups) is where rocket artillery is particularly useful. This allows for the shoot-and-scoot method, avoiding the enemy counter-battery fire that is the greatest risk to emplaced artillery pieces, while maximizing damage to the target before it can find better cover. (see Rocket artillery vs gun artillery)

=== Portable anti-tank ===
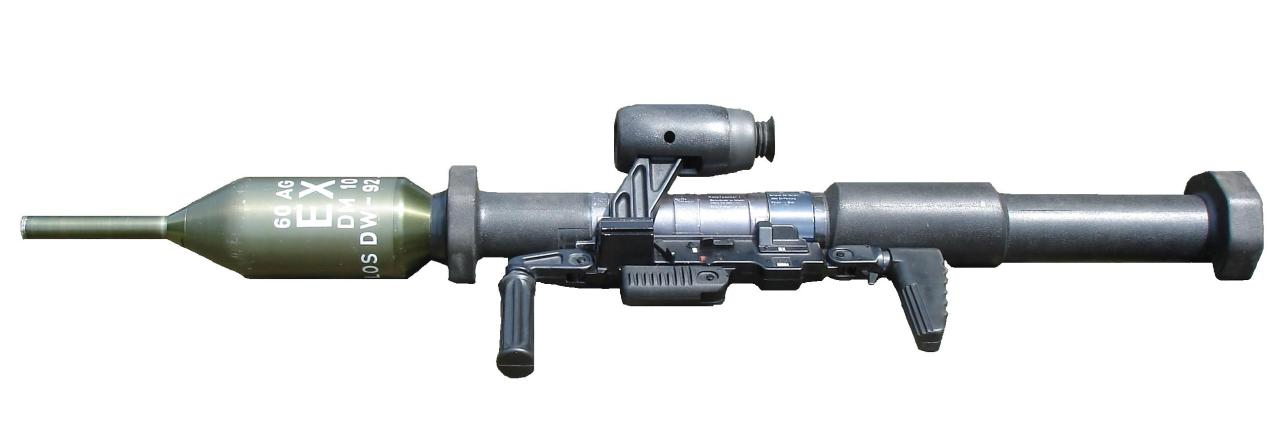
German Army Panzerfaust 3.

With the invention of the tank, the infantry required a weapon to counter the threat. Tank armour soon developed beyond the point at which an anti-tank rifle could practically be carried by an infantryman, and by the Second World War rocket weapons such as the US bazooka and German Panzerschreck were in service. Development continued after the war, with weapons such as the RPG-7, although a need to increase range led to the development of guided weapons to fulfill the anti-tank role. Most modern armies now use guided missiles for long-range engagements and rockets for close-range or emergency use; disposable weapons such as the RPG-26 are popular for this.

The use of anti-tank weapons to attack buildings and other targets has led to the development of weapons and ammunition designed specifically to attack non-tank targets, such as the one-shot LASM and the larger SMAW.

=== Air-launched ===
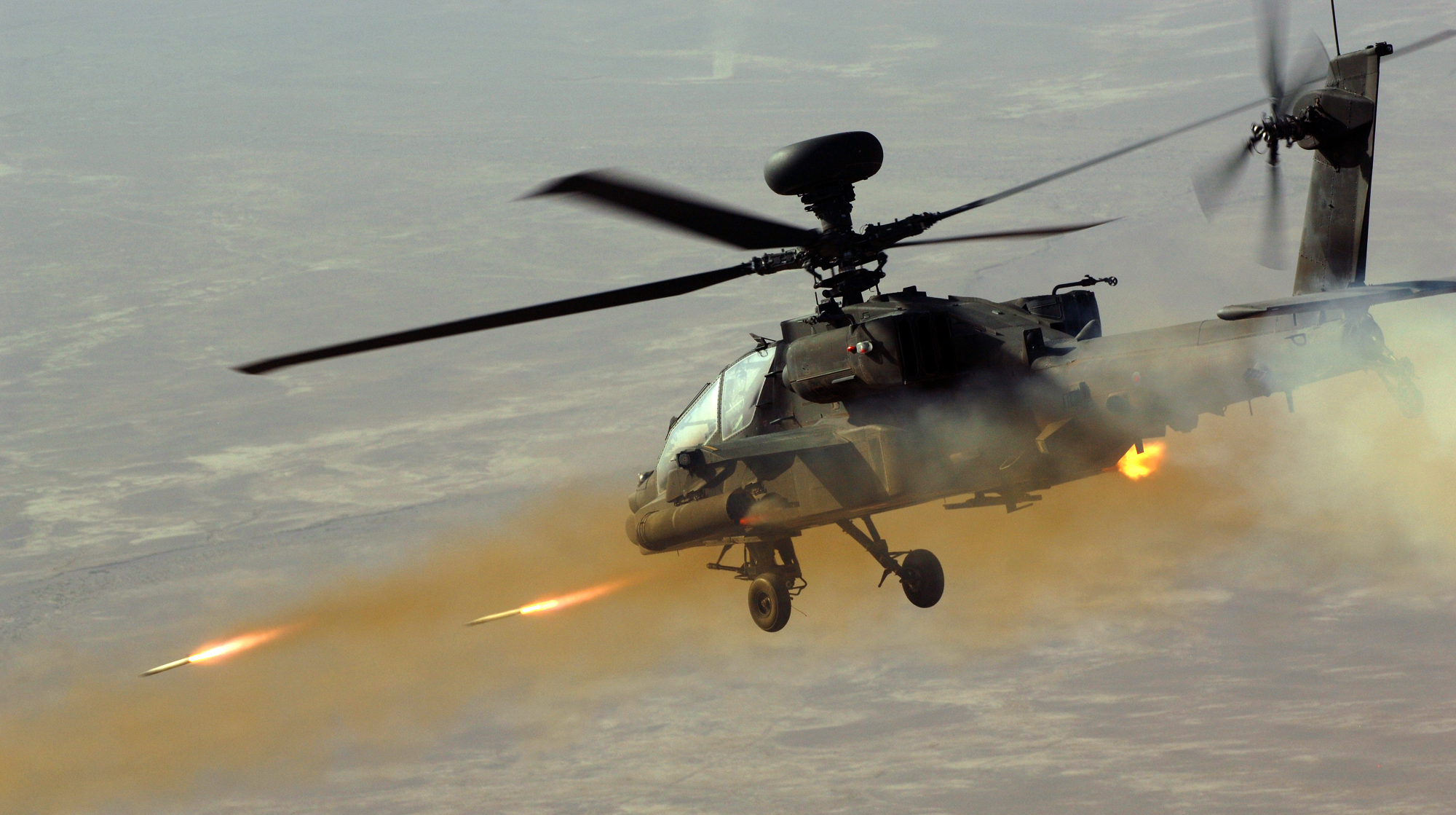
AH-64 firing rocket pods

Unguided rockets are a widely used weapon-system and have been launched from military aircraft to attack land, sea and air targets since 1916. French and British pilots used Le Prieur rockets to attack German observation balloons during the First World War.

Even after the development of guided missiles, rockets remain useful for short-range attacks – typically for close air support missions.

The standard NATO calibre is 70 mm and is considered the international calibre. The rockets can be fired from a variety of rotary and fixed-wing platforms and from combat aircraft of many nations worldwide by means of a rocket launcher. The 70 mm rocket system offers several warhead configurations that fulfill a wide range of special mission-requirements to defeat soft- to lightly-armored targets.

== See also ==
- Hydra 70
- CRV-7
- S-5 rocket
- S-8 rocket
- S-13 rocket
- Ugroza
- Advanced Precision Kill Weapon System (APKWS)
- FZ275 LGR
- Recoilless rifle
