= Vyazovoye, Prokhorovsky District, Belgorod Oblast =

Vyazovoye Вязовое
- Selo
- Location within Belgorod Oblast Location within Russia
- Coordinates: 51°09′N 37°00′E
- Country: Russia
- Region: Belgorod Oblast
- District: Prokhorovsky District
- Time zone: UTC+3:00

Vyazovoye (Russian: Вязовое) is a rural locality (a selo) and the administrative center of Vyazovskoye Rural Settlement, Prokhorovsky District, Belgorod Oblast, Russia. The population was 852 as of 2010. There are 10 streets.

== Geography ==
Vyazovoye is located 33 km northeast of Prokhorovka (the district's administrative centre) by road. Petrovka is the nearest rural locality.
