= S-13 rocket =

Soviet 122 mm air-launched rocket

S-13
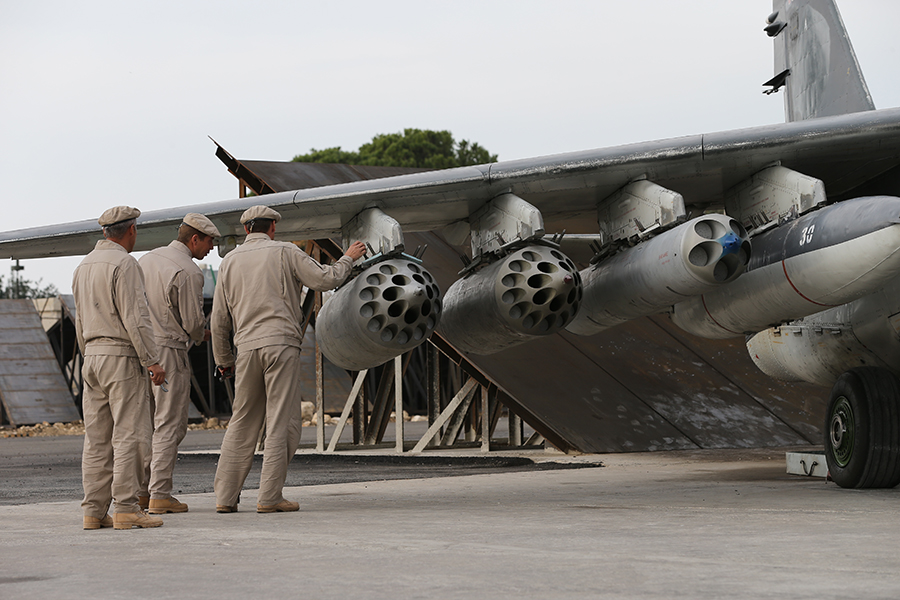
- S-13 rocket launcher for 5 rockets (right) beside 2 S-8 rocket launchers mounted under a Sukhoi Su-25 during Russian military intervention in the Syrian Civil War
- Type: Rocket
- Place of origin: Soviet Union

Service history
- Used by: Russian Aerospace Forces

Specifications
- Caliber: 122 mm
- Launch platform: Su-24, Su-25, Su-27, MiG-23BN, MiG-27, MiG-29, Mi-24, Mi-28, Ka-29TB, Kamov Ka-50/52

The S-13 is a 122 mm calibre unguided rocket weapon developed by the Soviet Air Force for use by military aircraft. It remains in service with the Russian Aerospace Forces and some other countries.

== Development ==
The S-13 rocket was developed in the 1970s to meet requirements for a penetrating weapon capable of cratering runways and penetrating hardened aircraft shelters, bunkers and pillboxes, to fill a gap between 80 mm and 240 mm rockets and fulfill a role similar to the 127 mm Zuni rocket. The S-13 is conventional in layout, with a solid rocket motor and folding tail fins that provide stability after launch.

The first trials were in 1973, but it was introduced only in 1983. S-13 rockets are shot from 5-tube launchers B-13L, that can be carried by most of Soviet and Russian attack and new fighter aircraft, like Sukhoi Su-17/20/22, Sukhoi Su-24, Sukhoi Su-25, Sukhoi Su-27, MiG-23BN, MiG-27, MiG-29. B-13L1 launcher is used by helicopters such as Mil Mi-24, Mil Mi-28, Kamov Ka-29TB, Kamov Ka-50 and Kamov Ka-52. S-13 rocket system has been accepted for operation on Sukhoi Su-30MK2, Sukhoi Su-24M, Sukhoi Su-25, Sukhoi Su-35, Yakovlev Yak-130, MiG-29BM, Mil Mi-28N.

== Launcher specifications ==
Designation	Length	Diameter	Unloaded weight	Number of rockets	Notes
B-13L	3.56 m	0.410 m	160 kg	5	0.15 seconds firing interval
B-13L1	3.06 m	0.410 m	140 kg	5	0.15 seconds firing interval

== Rocket specifications ==
Designation	Type	Length overall	Launch weight	Warhead weight	Range	Notes
S-13	Penetration	2.54 m	57 kg	21 kg (1.82 kg of explosive)	1.1 – 3 km	Penetrates 3 m of earth and 1 m of reinforced concrete. On runways it produces a demolition area of 20 m^{2}. Velocity 650 m/s.
S-13B	Penetration	2.63 m	60 kg	23 kg (1.92 kg of explosive)	n/a	Penetrates 3 m of earth and 1 m of concrete. Introduced in 2021.
S-13T	Tandem HEAT	2.99 m	75 kg	21 kg and 16.3 kg (1.8 kg and 2.7 kg of explosives)	1.1 – 4 km	Combined penetration of 6 m of earth and 1 m of reinforced concrete. Velocity 500 m/s
S-13OF	APAM/FRAG	2.97 m	69 kg	33 kg (7 kg of explosive)	1.6 – 3 km	Produces 450 splinters between 23 and 35 g, capable of penetrating lightly armoured vehicles such as APCs and IFVs. Velocity 530 m/s. Introduced in 1993.
S-13D	FAE	3.12 m	68 kg	32 kg (14.2 kg of fuel)	1.6 – 3 km	35 – 40 kg TNT equivalent. Velocity 530 m/s. Introduced in 1995.
S-13DF	FAE	3.12 m	68 kg	32 kg (14.6 kg of fuel)	0.5 – 6 km	Up to 40 kg TNT equivalent. Velocity 530 m/s. Ordered upgraded in 2018.

== See also ==
- S-8 rocket
- S-24 rocket
- Ugroza, a proposed upgrade of "dumb" rockets to salvo-fired laser-guided precision missiles
