= Ugroza =

Russian precision guided rocket

Ugroza (Russian: Угроза, meaning "menace") is a precision-guided weapons system developed by the Russian Federation. It is an upgrade for standard Russian "dumb" rockets, including the S-5, S-8, and S-13 rockets. The system upgrades the "dumb" rockets with laser guidance, very significantly increasing their accuracy. It requires a laser target designator, from either an airborne or land based source, to "paint" a target. Circular error probable (CEP) is about 0.8 to 1.8 m, while maximum ranges of rockets varies from the rockets used 1.5–8 km. Ugroza allows rockets to be ripple-fired up to 7 at a time.

The notable novelty is that the system does not use aerodynamic flight control (e.g. tail fins), but impulse steering with mini-thrusters. It has been dubbed as the Russian concept of impulse corrections (RCIC).

The concept has been demonstrated by Ametech (Russian: Аметех - Автоматизация и механизация технологий) on 1999 MAKS airshow, but it is not known if the system has been manufactured since, and in what numbers. The name Ugroza (sometimes transliterated Ugrosa), have been first used for the company's semi-active laser-guided projectile (SAL-GP) for the 122 mm BM-21 Grad series of multiple rocket launchers (it did not enter production and have been shelved as of 2010).

Sources are not clear whether optical (TV) guidance can be used in place of laser guidance.

The designation of rockets upgraded with Ugroza are given the suffix "Kor" (from Russian корректируемые, meaning "correctable"):

- S-5Kor
- S-8Kor
- S-13Kor
