= S-8 (rocket) =

Soviet/Russian air-launched military rocket

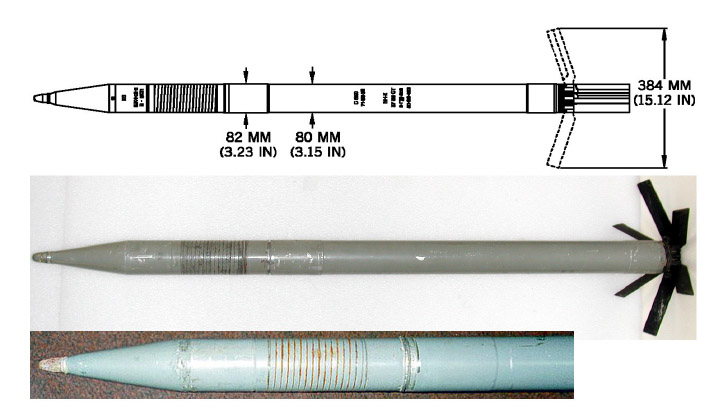
A S-8 KOM HEAT/FRAG rocket.

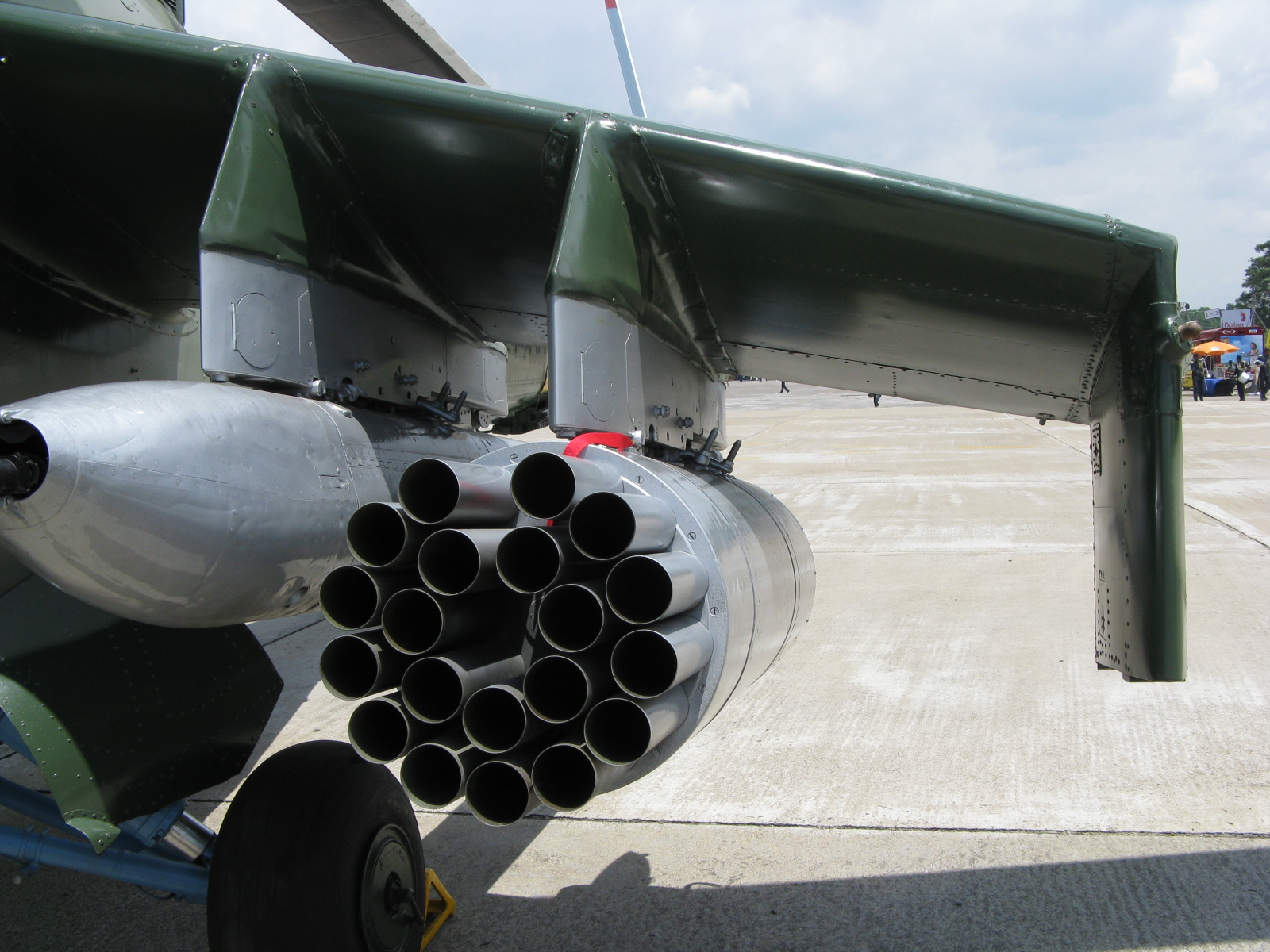
80mm Rocket Pods of a SLAF Mi-24.

The S-8 is a rocket weapon developed by the Soviet Air Force for use by military aircraft. It remains in service with the Russian Aerospace Forces and various export customers.

Developed in the 1970s, the S-8 is an 80 mm (3.1 in) rocket used by fighter bombers and helicopters. The system entered service in 1984 and is produced in a variety of subtypes with different warheads, including HEAT anti-armor, high-explosive fragmentation, smoke, and incendiary, as well as the specialized S-8BM runway-destroying munition and the S-8DM fuel-air explosive variants. Each rocket is between 1.5 meters (4 ft 11 in) and 1.7 meters (5 ft 7 in) long and weighs between 11.3 kg (25 lb) and 15.2 kg (33.5 lb), depending on warhead and fuse. Range is 2 to 4 kilometers (1.3 to 2.6 mi).

The S-8 is generally carried in the B series of rocket pods, carrying either seven or 20 rockets.

In 2018, the Russian Aerospace Forces took delivery and completed state tests of several batches of the S-8OFP Broneboishchik, successor to the S-8. While both rockets are unguided, the S-8OFP has greater range, a heavier warhead, and a digital fuse. The rocket is intended for armament of Su-25 type aircraft and Mi-8 helicopters, depending on the settings of the fuse, is able to penetrate obstacles facing the set targets, it can also explode in front of the obstacle and behind the obstacle. The S-8OFP entered service and put into serial production in May 2023.

An armored self-propelled 80-tube MLRS vehicle using S-8 rockets has been developed by Belarusian industry. Relatively short range of the rocket (3 – 5 km cross-ground) compared to Grad rockets is compensated for by lower cost and greater beaten area from a high number of rockets. Serbia has developed the helicopter pod L80-07. The S-8 has been used in ground-to-ground mode against Ukrainian positions at Pavlopil by pro-Russian forces during the war in Donbas on 4 May and 20 June 2020. Two unexploded rockets were defused by the Ukrainian army in the later incident.

== Rocket specifications ==
Designation	Type	Length overall	Launch weight	Warhead weight	Range	Notes
S-8	HEAT	1.56 m	11.5 kg	3.6 kg (0.9 kg of Hecphol-5/A-IX-10 explosive)	1.3 to 4 km	Basic variant. 350 mm versus RHA. Velocity 692 m/s. N-26A fuze. VIK-2D motor powder. During launch of this model may have black smoke.
S-8KO	HEAT	1.57 m	11.3 kg	3.6 kg (1.1 kg of Hecphol-5/A-IX-10 explosive)	1.3 to 4 km	400 mm versus RHA. Velocity 610 m/s. Improved fuze V-5KP1. Low smoke motor with powder BN-K.
S-8KOM	HEAT	1.57 m	11.3 kg	3.6 kg (1.1 kg of Hecphol-5/A-IX-10 explosive)	1.3 to 4 km	400 mm versus RHA. Velocity 700 m/s. Used improved BNK-P low smoke motor powder with twice burn time.
S-8B	Penetrating	1.5 m	15.2 kg	7.41 kg (0.6 kg of explosive)	1.2 to 2.2 km	800 mm versus reinforced concrete.
S-8BM	Penetrating	1.54 m	15.2 kg	7.41 kg (0.6 kg of explosive)	1.2 to 2.2 km	800 mm versus reinforced concrete. Velocity 450 m/s.
S-8D	FAE	1.66 m	11.6 kg	3.8 kg (2.15 kg of explosive)	1.3 to 3 km	
S-8DM	FAE	1.7 m	11.6 kg	3.8 kg (2.15 kg of explosive)	1.3 to 3 km	5.5–6 kg TNT equivalent. Velocity 590 m/s
S-8DF	FAE	1.68 m	13.4 kg	5.5 kg (3.3 kg of explosive)	1.3 to 4 km	6 kg TNT equivalent. Velocity 500 m/s
S-8 O	Illuminating	1.63 m	12.1 kg	4.3 kg	4 to 4.5 km	2 megacandela flare warhead
S-8 OM	Illuminating	1.63 m	12.1 kg	4.3 kg	4 to 4.5 km	2 megacandela flare warhead burns for 30 seconds. Velocity 545 m/s.
S-8T	Tandem-HEAT	1.68 m	15 kg	6.6 kg (1.6 kg of explosive)	1.3 to 4 km	Tandem HEAT 360–400 mm versus RHA after ERA, 440 mm versus RHA. Velocity 470 m/s
S-8P	Chaff	1.63 m	12.3 kg	4.5 kg of chaff	2 to 3 km	
S-8PM	Chaff	1.63 m	12.3 kg	4.5 kg of chaff	2 to 3 km	545 m/s velocity.
S-8S	Flechette	1.612 m	13 kg	4.3 kg	1.2 to 3.5 km	2,000 flechettes in 5 bundles
S-8TsM	Target marking	1.605 m	11.1 kg	3.6 kg	1.3 to 2 km (heli); 1.3 to 3 km (plane)	target/route marking smoke visible 6 km away
S-8OFP1	HE-Frag-Penetrating	1.428 m	16.7 kg	9.2 kg (2.8 kg of explosive)	up to 6 km	improved motor with twice energy; pre-fragmented body; dual-mode fuzes allow to detonate after penetration of concrete or light armor; nicknamed "Broneboyshchik"

S-8OFP was already deployed in mid-late 2018 and have been seen at operational launch with Mi-35M helicopter.

== See also ==
- S-5 rocket
- S-13 rocket
- Ugroza, a proposed upgrade of "dumb" rockets to salvo-fired laser-guided precision missiles
- Hydra 70
