= United States 40 mm grenades =

Ammunition variants in military use

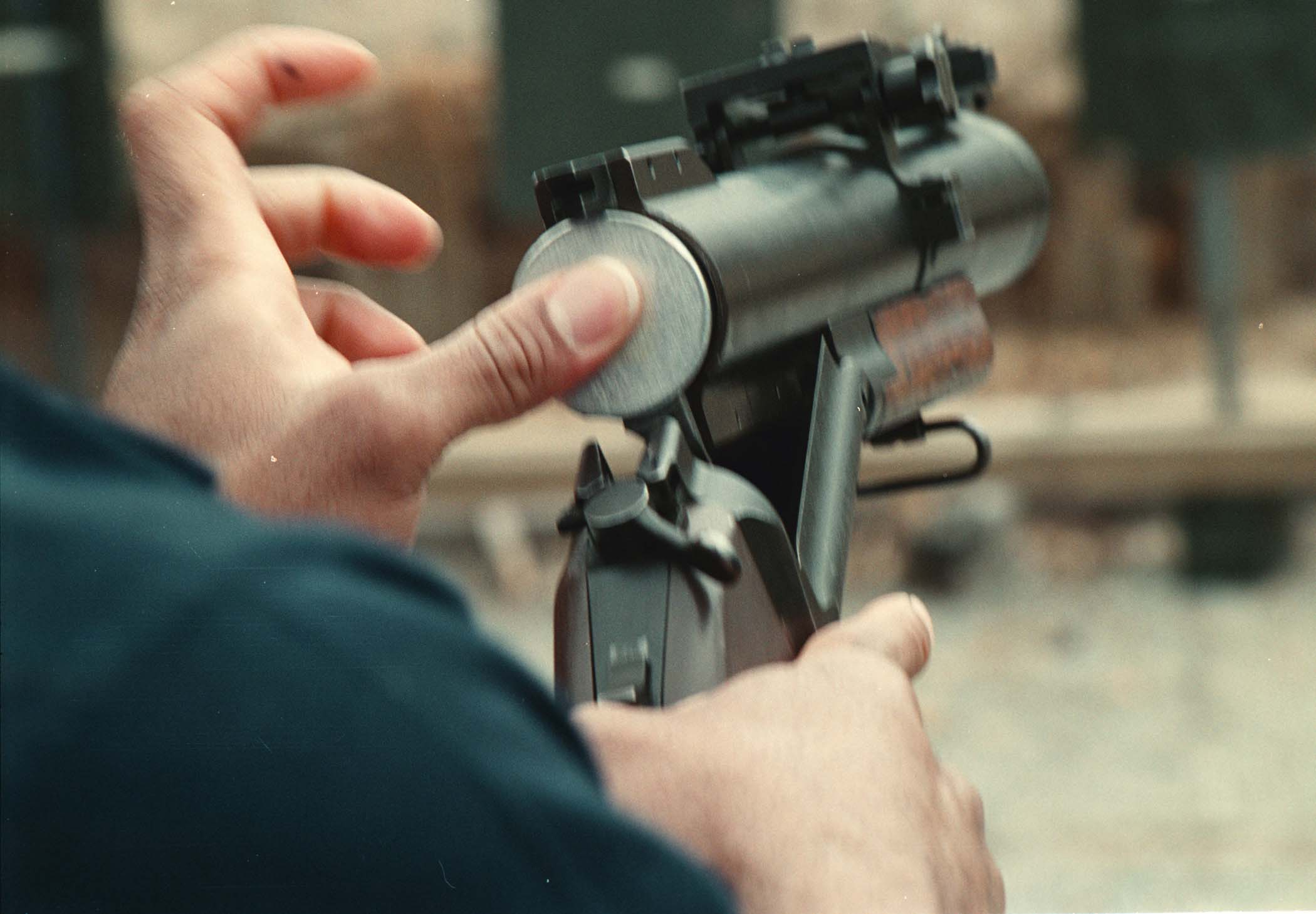
A less-lethal 40×46 mm round is loaded into an M79 grenade launcher

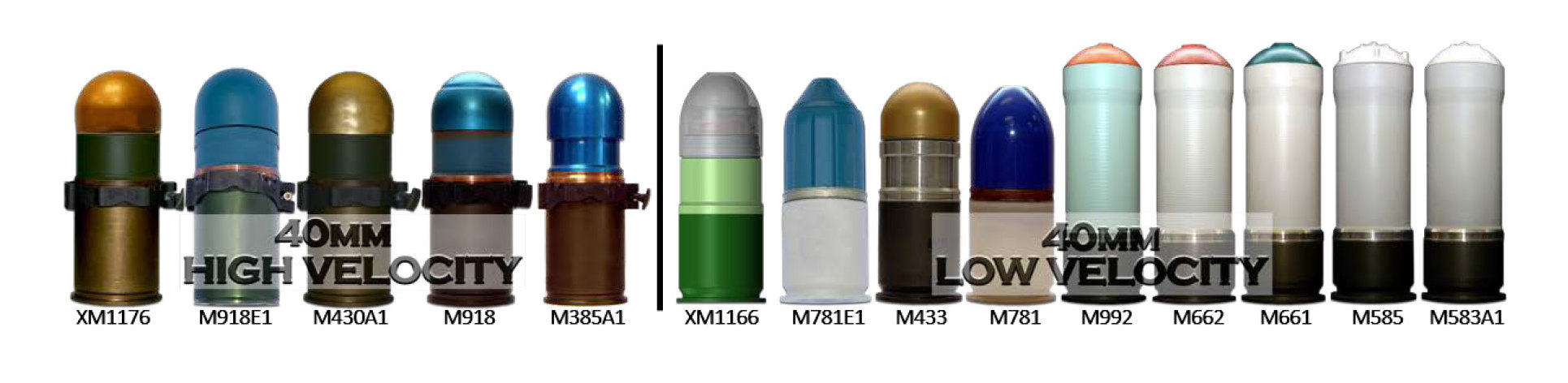

The United States Armed Forces has created a plethora of different types of 40 mm grenades in both the low-velocity 40×46 mm and high-velocity 40×53 mm calibers which uses what it calls a high–low propulsion system which keeps recoil forces within the boundaries of an infantry weapon. Presented on this page is a basic overview.

== High-explosive cartridges ==
=== Standard high-explosive cartridges ===
High explosive grenades were one of the first rounds created for the 40×46 mm and 40×53 mm calibers, and while basic HE grenades have largely been replaced by more complex multi-purpose ones, they are nonetheless an important part of their development.

40×46 mm types include the M381, M386, M406, and M441. The M386/M406 differ from the M381/M441 in that they have longer arming distances (14–28 meters compared to the 2–3 meters of the M381 and M441).

40x53 mm types include the M383 (and the M383E1) and the M384.

=== Other high-explosive cartridges ===
HE grenades have been considered the standard for both types of 40 mm grenades, but over the years the functions of the weapons using these grenades has dramatically expanded, and as a result the need to be able to engage larger and more armored targets.

40×46 mm types include the M397A1, M433, M463, and the newer M1060.

The M397 is a pre-set airburst munition, designed to allow grenadiers to engage targets in trenches and behind cover. It features a bounding charge that is detonated by ground impact.

The M433 HEDP (high explosive, dual purpose), standardized in 1971, has largely become the standard with its ability to effectively engage light vehicles and personnel. The M433 combines a small shaped charge with a wire fragmentation mesh for the dual effect.

The M463 is a specialist type developed during the Vietnam War by AAI, and is smokeless and flashless (SF), and uses a type of piston system to force the grenade out of the cartridge, but keep the propellant and gases contained. While this does reduce the effective range of the projectile, it allows for an almost silent 40 mm HE grenade.

The M1060 is a thermobaric cartridge, designed to destroy targets through a combination of intense heat and forceful overpressure (concussion). The M1060 was developed in order to give grenade launchers a far greater effect against static targets such as bunkers, houses, and masonry.

The M430 and M430A1 are 40×53 mm HEDP cartridges akin to the low-velocity M433. They differ in how much armor they can penetrate, with the M430 being able to penetrate 51 mm of steel plate, and the M430A1 being able to penetrate 76 mm.

The replacement HEDP XM1176 is a high-explosive dual purpose grenade designed to be fired by automatic grenade launchers, like the Mk19.

The grenade can be set to explode on impact. It can penetrate the steel plate of lightly armored vehicles. Alternately, it can be programmed to explode in an air burst. An intelligent aiming system calculates the range the operator's target. When the operator finishes pulling the trigger, the range at which the munition should explode is downloaded to the projectile.

Also produced was a special 40×53 mm airburst munition for use with either the M75 or M129 automatic grenade launchers, commonly used from helicopters. This round was designated M684.

== Anti-personnel cartridges ==
When 40 mm grenade launchers were first developed, the weapon was to be the primary weapon of the infantryman carrying it. It was quickly found that in most engagements, while the grenadier gave the squad a decided force multiplier, they were also decidedly exposed if presented with an enemy within the arming distance of most high explosive rounds. Rounds with shorter arming distances presented significant danger to the shooters if used at those ranges. Prior to development of grenade launchers attached to standard infantry rifles, development commenced on non-explosive cartridges to allow those armed with grenade launchers to engage targets at shorter ranges safely.

Similar rounds have also been developed for weapons chambering the higher velocity 40x53 mm cartridge as well.

These anti-personnel rounds fall primarily into what is considered the "canister" category.

40×46 mm types include the M576 series.

The M576 contains twenty 20-grain (1.30-gram) metal pellets. The XM576/XM576E1 was standardized to become the M576. Another test variant, the XM576E2, which had twenty-seven 20-grain (1.30-gram) metal pellets without a sabot within the shot cup, was deemed to spread too quickly for effective use.

The only current 40×53 mm type is the M1001, a canister round filled with one-hundred and fifteen 17-grain 2.0-inch long flechettes. During the late 1960s, Nortronics was developing the XM678. References have listed different projectile loads ranging from thirty-two 0.24 inch carbide pellets up to fifty-four 30 grain (1.94 gram) tungsten pellets.

== Smoke, signaling, and illumination cartridges ==
=== Smoke cartridges ===
The most numerous of the 40×46 mm grenades, smoke rounds can be launched further than normal smoke hand grenades can be thrown, and come in numerous colors. These grenades are used for both signaling and obscuration, and come in two main types, "canopy" and "ground marker".

40×46 mm canopy smoke grenades come in three colors: yellow (M676), white (M680), and red (M682). These were developed to penetrate dense canopy foliage in order to mark or signal a position.

Ground markers also come in three colors: red (M713), green (M715), and yellow (M716).

In development are new marking cartridges designed to improve the already considerable night-fighting capabilities of US forces. The XM1062 and XM1065 operate like conventional ground markers, but the XM1062 marks in the IR spectrum, while the XM1065 shows up on thermal imaging devices.

Older cartridges designed specifically for the M79 grenade launcher or the AN/M8 pyrotechnic pistol also remain in inventory. The XM675/M675 is a red smoke cartridge used primarily for training in the use of the XM674/M674 riot control cartridge.

A 40×53 mm white phosphorus cartridge, designated XM574, was developed, but not standardized. Intended for use in the UH-1B Iroquois helicopter using the M5 Armament Subsystem, the round was not adopted because of safety concerns. Testing during 1966 concluded that there were significant reliability issues, as well as, potential environmental concerns (detonation or malfunction from high temperatures and humidity in the South East Asian theater) and increased vulnerability (the WP filler was dangerous if struck by small arms fire).

=== Signalling and illumination cartridges ===
Unlike conventional hand grenades, a personal grenade launcher can easily be used to launch flares as a signaling or illumination device. Like 40 mm smoke grenades in the US military, they are all of 40×46 mm caliber, serving more of a use in an individual rather than a crew-served capacity. They also come in two main types, cluster flares and parachute flares. Cluster flares are used primarily for signaling, while parachute flares are used primarily for illumination.

40×46 mm cluster flares come in three colors: white (M585), green (M663), and red (M664). Individual flares burn for seven seconds after ignition. The M585 is the standardization of the XM585E1. The differences between it and the XM585 are unclear.

Parachute flares come in four colors: white (M583/A1), green (M661), red (M662), and orange (XM695). The parachute is designed to create a seven-feet-per-second descent, while the flare itself has a 40-second burn time. The XM695 was never standardized.

Also, because of the development in the United States military of complex night-fighting tactics, an illumination cartridge for use with night vision equipment, that illuminates in the infrared spectrum was also developed.

The infra-red illumination cartridge (IRIC) M992 is a 40 mm low pressure grenade, designed to be fired from man-portable grenade launchers, to provide infrared illumination.

The grenade is designed to be fired into the air. When it gets to its maximum height it deploys a small parachute, and ignites an infrared pyrotechnic flare. The flare is designed to only provide useful illumination to people wearing night-vision googles. The flare will burn for at least 40 seconds. If fired directly overhead it can reach an altitude of 500 feet (150 m) to 700 feet (210 m). The parachute slows its descent to 7 feet (2.1 m) per second

The similar M583A1 is fired the same way, but illuminates in visible light.

== Less-lethal and riot-control cartridges ==
With the greater emphasis on improving less-lethal capabilities of the U.S. military in response to the changing nature of U.S. deployments around the world, less-lethal and riot control cartridges have been developed over the years. These rounds are often akin to 37 mm cartridges that have been in use by law enforcement for years. These cartridges are also mainly 40×46 mm.

Oldest of these types is the riot control 40 mm gas cartridge. In the U.S. military the standard CS gas cartridge is designated M651. The M651 has 53 grams of CS mixture. Burn time is 25 seconds, with coverage of 120 square meters. The round is effective to 200 meters against point targets and 400 meters against area targets. It is unclear which of the experimental variants, either the XM651 or XM651E1 was standardized.

Older cartridges designed specifically for the M79 grenade launcher or the AN/M8 pyrotechnic pistol also remain in inventory. The XM674/M674 is a CS riot control agent cartridge. The unit contains 90-100 grams of CS mixture, with a 2-7 second ignition delay and burn time of 10 to 40 seconds. The round is effective to a distance of 65 to 90 meters. It can also be hand fired.

More recent have been a variety of canister rounds and other less-lethal projectiles. The M1029 contains 48 rubber balls of .48 inch diameter. The M1029 is still considered to be potentially lethal under 10 meters and ineffective at distances over 30 meters.

The M1006 launches a solid foam "sponge grenade" at high enough velocity to wind someone or in extreme cases perhaps even break bones. The use of a softer foam sponge in the M1006 is likely a product of the serious injuries and fatalities caused by rubber and plastic batons in use by police forces around the world over the last few decades. The M1006 is still potentially lethal when fired at distances under 10 meters, having an 81-meter per second muzzle velocity, and is largely ineffective at distances over 50 meters.

== Unique and specialist cartridges ==
The XM688 cartridge was designed as a sort of giant grenade launching cartridge. It was supposed to be coupled with the grapnel, launcher propelled, XM1 and the M79. The resulting combination allowed users to launch a hook over a greater distance than if it had been thrown, thus allowing them to scale to higher places. Similar systems had been developed independently, and had been used during the landings at Normandy during the Second World War at Pointe du Hoc, but the XM688 allowed an existing infantry weapon to be used in this capacity.

== Green ammunition ==
The MK281 is a new type of 40 mm grenade ammunition that has been accepted for use into the United States Marine Corps and the United States Army. The Rheinmetall MK281 Mod 0 and Mod 1 40×53 mm practice cartridges are precision, high-velocity training and practice cartridges. The MK281 uses a patented Rheinmetall propulsion unit that is designed to produce a very low standard deviation in muzzle velocity for improved accuracy. The MK281 round is compatible with all types of automatic grenade launchers, including the MK19, the MK47 and the HK GMG, and comes in two different types: 40×53 mm cartridge MK281 Mod0 impact marker and 40×53 mm cartridge MK281 Mod1 day-night marker. The MK281 is manufactured by an American subsidiary of the Rheinmetall Group. The Mod1 cartridge allows operators to train at night; the cartridge marking is visible to both the naked eye and when using night vision equipment. As an additional option, a tracer is available for both variants of the cartridge. This tracer has a burn time of six seconds and allows the user to observe the ammunition’s trajectory as it approaches the target.

== See also ==
- 35 mm grenade
- List of individual weapons of the U.S. Armed Forces
- List of vehicles of the U.S. Armed Forces
