= Surgical strike =

Precise military attack

A surgical strike is a military attack which is intended to damage only a legitimate military target, with no or minimal collateral damage to surrounding structures, vehicles, buildings, or the general public infrastructure and utilities.

== Description ==
A swift and targeted attack with the aim of minimum collateral damage to the nearby areas and civilians is a surgical strike. Neutralization of targets with surgical strikes also prevents escalation to a full-blown war. Surgical strike attacks can be carried out via air strike, airdropping special ops teams or a swift ground operation or by sending special troops.

Precision bombing is another example of a surgical strike carried out by aircraft – it can be contrasted against carpet bombing, the latter which results in high collateral damage and a wide range of destruction over an affected area which may or may not include high civilian casualties. The bombing of Baghdad during the initial stages of the 2003 invasion of Iraq by US forces, known as "shock and awe" is an example of a coordinated surgical strike, where government buildings and military targets were systematically attacked by US aircraft in an attempt to cripple the Ba'athist controlled Iraqi government under Saddam Hussein.

== Examples ==
=== Azerbaijan ===
On 14 October 2020, during the 2020 Nagorno-Karabakh conflict, Azerbaijan carried out surgical strikes against Armenian forces and destroyed three R-17 Elbrus tactical ballistic missile launchers in Kalbajar District, de jure part of Azerbaijan, but under de facto independent Artsakh's control. According to Azerbaijan, the missile launchers had been targeting Ganja and Mingachevir, and the strike was in retaliation of the 11 October Ganja ballistic missile attack, which resulted in ten civilians getting killed and 40 more getting injured, with women and children being among the victims. Armenia confirmed that sites within Armenia had been struck while continuing to deny it had attacked Azerbaijan.

=== Israel ===
Israel's Entebbe raid in 1976, through which Israeli passengers were freed from a hijacked plane that landed in Uganda, is considered a successful surgical strike. Even though it did not involve taking out a specific military target, the operation was carried out deep inside foreign territory and the IDF commandos travelled 5,000 miles from start to finish without engaging any other forces or causing any collateral damage to the country where the operation took place, thus befitting the term.

Israel's 1981 bombing of the Iraqi nuclear reactor Osirak is considered a prime example of a surgical strike.

=== United States ===
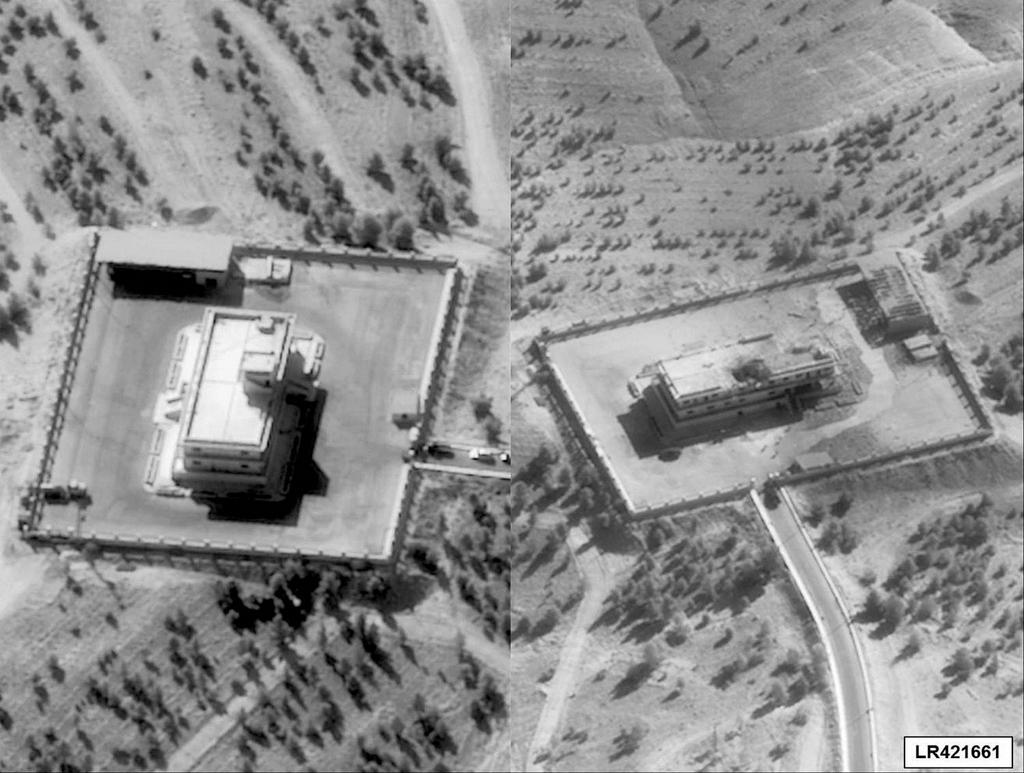
Aftermath of a precision airstrike conducted by a U.S. F-22 on an Islamic State controlled building in Syria, 23 September 2014

The 1986 bombing of targets in the Libyan cities of Tripoli and Benghazi were carried out using surgical strike tactics, with both ground-based and carrier-based attack aircraft striking airports, barracks, and military training centers. The stated goals of the attack were to cripple Libya's ability to train and support terrorists, but it has been rumored that the attack was also an assassination attempt on Muammar Gaddafi.

The United States carried out numerous surgical strikes against Al-Qaeda targets in Afghanistan using cruise missiles. It also used the same technology against a purported chemical weapons facility in Sudan.

== See also ==
- Punitive expedition
- Point targets
- Decapitation strike
- Targeted killing
