= XM301 =

- Type: Three-barreled Gatling-style rotary cannon
- Place of origin: United States

Service history
- In service: Not in active service
- Used by: United States

Production history
- Designed: 1992
- Manufacturer: General Dynamics

Specifications
- Mass: 80.5 pounds (36.5 kg)
- Length: 71.89 in (182.6 cm)
- Shell: 20×102mm
- Shell weight: 100 grams (3.5 oz) (HEI projectile)
- Caliber: 20 millimetres (0.79 in)
- Barrels: three-barrel
- Action: Hydraulically operated, electrically fired, Gatling
- Rate of fire: 750 or 1,500 rounds per minute
- Muzzle velocity: 3,380 feet per second (1,030 m/s) (with PGU-28/B round)
- Feed system: Belt or linkless feed system

The XM301 Cannon was an externally powered, three-barrel 20 mm rotary cannon made by General Dynamics for the United States Army. Developed for use with the RAH-66 Comanche stealth helicopter, it is the world's lightest 20 mm rotary cannon. The XM301 was designed to be a versatile and accurate lightweight cannon that could serve both an air-to-air and air-to-ground role. Development and manufacture of the XM301 was cancelled in 2004 along with its parent RAH-66 program.

== Description ==
The XM301 is a lightweight, three-barrel version of the M61 Vulcan. It is externally powered, relying on the same power delivery system as the Vulcan. It fires M50 and PGU-series ammunition found in the Vulcan, as well as newer lightweight X1031/1032 aluminum-cased ammunition at either 750 or 1,500 rounds per minute. Designed for use in combat helicopters, the XM301 boasts a dispersion of 2.2 milliradians, making it accurate at long ranges. The XM301 weighs 80.5 pounds, less than a third the weight of the Vulcan. It can hold 500 rounds of ammunition and is able to be field-reloaded in 15 minutes. The turret allows an aiming range of +15° to -45° in elevation and ±120° azimuth. It may be stored at +2° in elevation and 180° azimuth in order to reduce radar cross-section.

== Development ==
Development on the XM301 began in 2001 as part of the RAH-66 Comanche project. Originally developed in the 1980s, the Comanche had been tested with a two-barrel version of the M61 Vulcan, but it was upgraded to a three-barrel unit before General Dynamics took over the program in 2001. In its early stages the XM301 was known as the GE Vulcan II, an improved M197 Gatling gun. General Dynamics worked in tandem with Groupement Industriel des Armements Terrestres (GIAT) to develop the primary armament system for the RAH-66, with GIAT developing the turret and General Dynamics the weapon itself. The RAH-66 first flew in January 1996 with a non-functional version of the XM301, although subsequent flights used a working development model, with development testing beginning in 1997. General Dynamics and GIAT were contracted to deliver a total of 1,217 XM301 weapon systems to the U.S. Army, but funding for the RAH-66 was redistributed to the upgrade of existing helicopters in February 2004.

== See also ==
- List of multiple-barrel firearms
