= M75 grenade launcher =

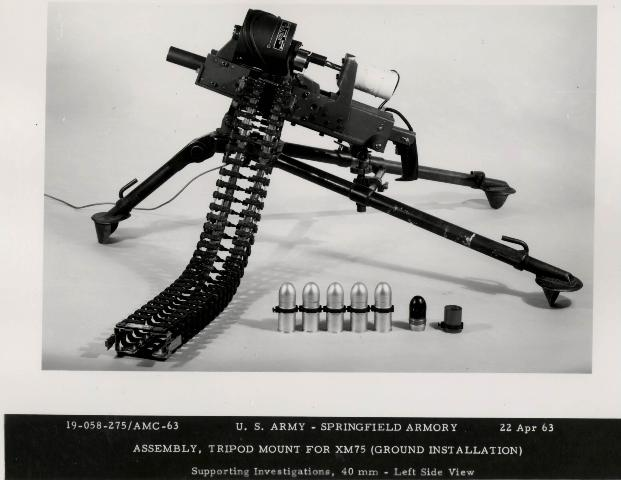
- The ground-based XM75 grenade launcher on a heavy tripod mounting.
- Type: Automatic grenade launcher
- Place of origin: United States

Service history
- Used by: United States
- Wars: Vietnam War

Production history
- Designer: Philco-Ford
- Designed: 1961
- Manufacturer: Springfield Armory
- Unit cost: $1,127.00 (in 1967)
- Produced: 1965-1967
- No. built: 500

Specifications
- Cartridge: M384 High-Explosive, M385 Practice
- Caliber: 40 mm
- Action: Automatic, motor driven
- Rate of fire: 225 rpm
- Muzzle velocity: 790 feet per second (240 m/s)
- Effective firing range: 2,045 yards (1,870 m)
- Feed system: belt

The M75 is a 40mm automatic grenade launcher that was used primarily as an aircraft weapon in United States service and was one of the first weapons to use the high velocity 40x53mm grenade.

== Overview ==
Development of the M75 began in the late 1950s by the Philco-Ford Corporation (later referred to in this time period as Ford Aerospace). While 40mm low velocity grenades were being developed for infantry use, the M75 was to be an aircraft weapon using a higher velocity grenade for additional range. While an aircraft gun pod designated the XM13 was developed for it, it would see far greater use as a helicopter weapon, mainly during the Vietnam War. The most notable systems the M75 was part of were the M5 used on the UH-1 Iroquois and the turreted M28 system used on the AH-1 Cobra. In the last case the weapon was quickly replaced by the improved M129 launcher.

== Design ==
The weapon is described as an "air-cooled, electrically powered, rapid firing weapon." All portions of the firing cycle are powered this way, so the unit requires an external power source. Other important features are the reciprocating barrel and cam assembly that drive the other components of the system. All phases of the weapon cycle are positively controlled by the drum cam assembly in which a planetary gear train is enclosed, responsible for reducing the motor's high speed to the desired rate for the gun. The 5/8 horsepower (470 W) 28 Volts DC motor is mounted on the turret bracket and drives the drum cam through a flexible shaft in order to isolate it from the weapon's recoil. The weapon accepts linked ammunition, which was fed from rotary drums in the case of the M5 and M28 systems, and from boxes in the case of the XM9 systems. The M5 could also use a box magazine.

== Derivative ==
While the M75 had no variants, Philco-Ford developed an improved derivative, the M129, which quickly supplanted the M75. The M129 was effectively a redesign of the older weapon to incorporate a concentric cam and improved mount, as well as a higher rate of fire of 400 rpm. The major problem with the M75 was the torque created due to the barrel being below the operating drum. In the M129 the barrel is concentric with the drum and the excessive torque is thus eliminated. The M129 was used in the XM8 and the aforementioned M28 helicopter armament systems, as well as the XM51 for the ill-fated AH-56 Cheyenne and being trialed as a door gun for the UH-1 series with the XM94 system. Operation of the weapon is extremely similar to that of the M75, with the reciprocating barrel and cam assembly still presenting itself, and the weapon still being electrically driven.

== See also ==
- List of grenade launchers
- List of crew-served weapons of the U.S. Armed Forces
- Mk 19 grenade launcher
- M129 grenade launcher
- United States 40 mm grenades
- U.S. aircraft gun pods
- U.S. Helicopter Armament Subsystems
- Comparison of automatic grenade launchers
