= U.S. helicopter armament subsystems =

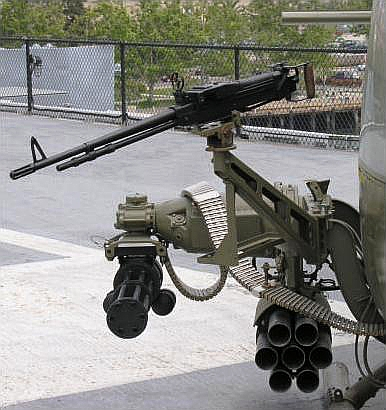
Typical armament for UH-1 gunship, M134 minigun and Mk 40 FFAR with a swivel-mounted M60 machine gun

Helicopter armament systems developed by the United States military since the early 1960s include offensive and defensive weapons and gear of various types, including machine guns, grenade launchers, autocannon, and rockets.

== Introduction ==
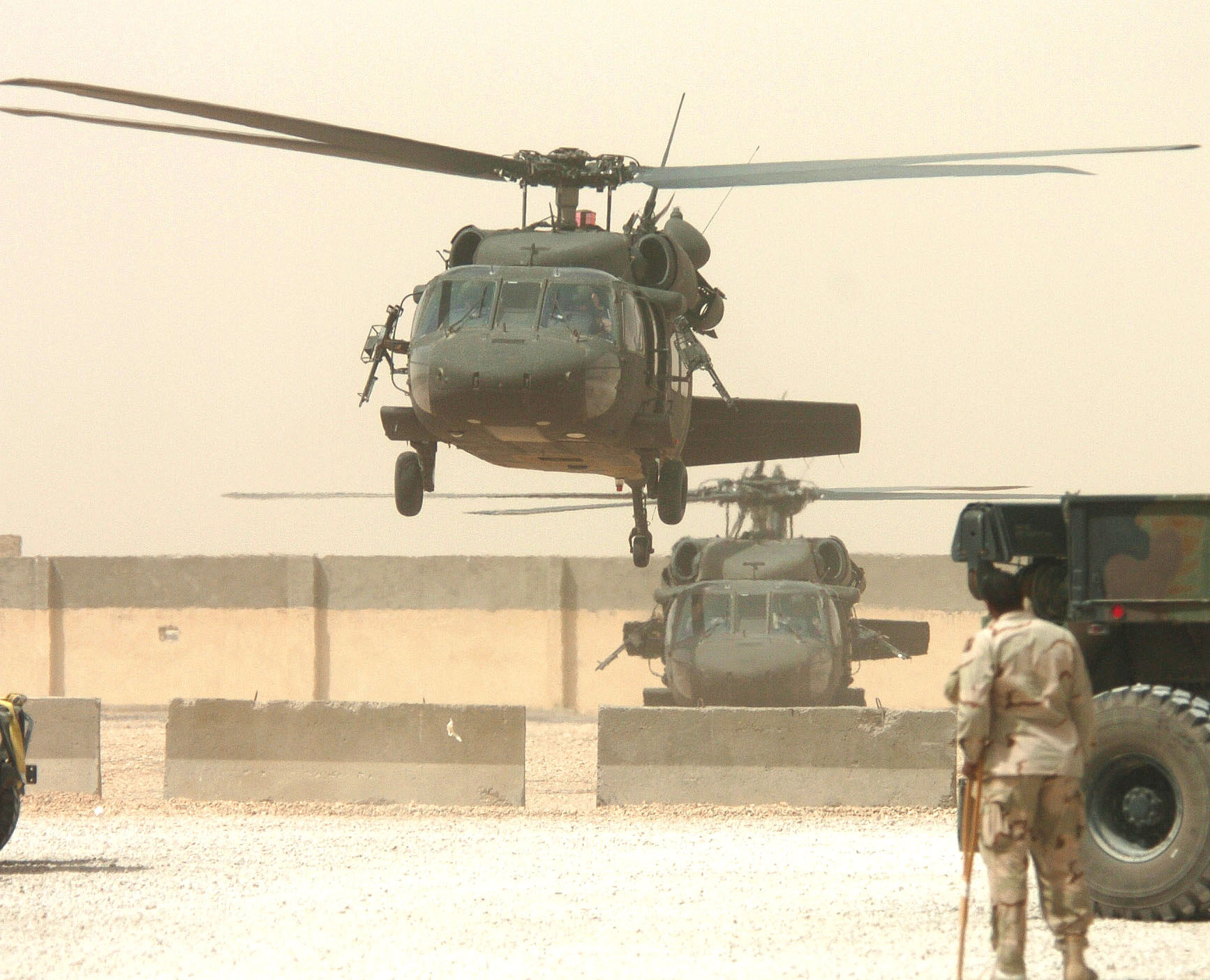
UH-60 Blackhawk helicopters equipped with M60D machine guns on the M144 Armament Subsystem near Najaf, Iraq in May 2005

The United States Army began to experiment with air mobile tactics during the Korean War, and by 1962, was developing armed helicopters for attack and defense. That year saw the deployment of the UTTHCO (Utility Tactical Transport Helicopter Company) to help the South Vietnamese Army and to test new air mobile theory. Weapons used by UTTHCO were often crude and made from parts and weapons readily available in the field.

By 1965, the United States had deployed an Air Mobile unit, the 17th Cavalry, which began to use more standardized armament. During the Vietnam War, the US Army, US Marine Corps, and US Air Force developed and used armament systems for a variety of helicopters.

With the arrival of dedicated gunship helicopters such as the AH-1 Cobra, introduced in 1967, and later the AH-64 Apache, armament subsystems for non-specific types would begin to drop off, although defensive armament packages remained popular.

=== Designated systems ===
Systems designated by the US Army include:

Nomenclature	Aircraft	Weapon(s)
Armament Subsystem, Helicopter, Caliber .30 Machine Gun, Twin, M1	Bell OH-13 Sioux and Hiller OH-23 Raven	M37C machine gun
Armament Subsystem, Helicopter, 7.62-MM Machine Gun, Twin, M2	OH-13 Sioux and OH-23 Raven	M60C machine gun
Helicopter Armament Subsystem, 2.75-Inch Rocket Launcher, M3	UH-1B/C/M Iroquois	Mk 4/Mk 40 Folding-Fin Aerial Rocket (FFAR)
Helicopter Armament Subsystem, 2.75-Inch Rocket Launcher, M4	CH-34 Choctaw	Mk 40 FFAR
Armament Subsystem, Helicopter, 40-MM Grenade Launcher, M5	UH-1B/C/M Iroquois	M75 grenade launcher
Armament Subsystem, Helicopter, 7.62-MM Machine Gun, Quad, M6	UH-1B/C Iroquois	M60C machine gun
Armament Subsystem, Helicopter, 7.62-MM Machine Gun, Twin, M7	OH-6 Cayuse	M60C machine gun
Armament Subsystem, Helicopter, 40-MM Grenade Launcher, M8	OH-6 Cayuse	M129 grenade launcher
Armament Subsystem, Helicopter, 7.62-MM Machine Gun - 2.75-Inch Rocket Launcher, M16	UH-1B/C Iroquois	M60C machine gun and Mk 40 FFAR
Armament Subsystem, Helicopter, 2.75-Inch Rocket Launcher, M17	UH-1B/C Iroquois	Mk 40 FFAR
Armament Subsystem, Helicopter, 7.62-MM Machine Gun - 2.75-Inch Rocket Launcher, Twin, High Rate, M21	UH-1B/C/M Iroquois	M134 machine gun and Mk 40 FFAR
Guided Missile Launcher, Helicopter Armament Subsystem, M22	UH-1B/C Iroquois	SS.11 (as AGM-22) missile
Armament Subsystem, Helicopter, 7.62-MM Machine Gun, Door Mounted, Lightweight, M23	UH-1D/H Iroquois	M60D machine gun
Armament Subsystem, Helicopter, 7.62-MM Machine Gun, Door Mounted, Lightweight, M24	CH-47 Chinook	M60D machine gun
Guided Missile Launcher, Helicopter Armament Subsystem, M26	UH-1B/C Iroquois	BGM-71 TOW missile
Armament Subsystem, Helicopter, 7.62-MM Machine Gun, High Rate, M27	OH-6 Cayuse	M134 machine gun
Armament Subsystem, Helicopter, 7.62-MM Machine Gun - 40-MM Grenade Launcher, M28	AH-1G/Q/R/S Cobra	M134 machine gun and M129 grenade launcher
Armament Subsystem, Helicopter, 7.62-MM Machine Gun, Door Mounted, Lightweight, M29	UH-1B/C Iroquois	M60D machine gun
Armament Subsystem, Helicopter, 30-MM Cannon, M30	UH-1B/C Iroquois	XM140 cannon
Armament Subsystem, Helicopter, 20-MM Cannon, M31	UH-1B/C Iroquois	M24A1 cannon
Armament Subsystem, Helicopter, M32	ACH-47A Chinook	M60D machine gun or M2HB machine gun.
Armament Subsystem, Helicopter, M33	ACH-47A Chinook	M60D machine gun or M2HB machine gun
Armament Subsystem, Helicopter, 20-MM Cannon, M34	ACH-47A Chinook	M24A1 cannon
Armament Subsystem, Helicopter, 20-MM Cannon, High Rate, M35	AH-1G Cobra	M195 cannon
Armament Subsystem, Helicopter, 7.62-MM Machine Gun, Ramp Mounted, Lightweight, M41	CH-47 Chinook	M60D machine gun
Armament Subsystem, Helicopter, 7.62-MM Machine Gun - 2.75-Inch Rocket Launcher - 40-MM Grenade Launcher, Twin, High Rate, M50	UH-1B/C/M Iroquois	M134 machine gun, M75 grenade launcher, and Mk 40 FFAR
Armament Subsystem, Helicopter, 40-MM Grenade Launcher, M51	AH-56 Cheyenne	M129 grenade launcher
Armament Subsystem, Helicopter, 30-MM Cannon, M52	AH-56 Cheyenne	XM140 cannon
Armament Subsystem, Helicopter, 7.62-MM Machine Gun, High Rate, M53	AH-56 Cheyenne	M196 machine gun
Armament Subsystem, Helicopter, Door Mounted, M59	UH-1D/H Iroquois	M213 machine gun or XM175 Grenade Launcher
Armament Subsystem, Helicopter, 7.62-MM Machine Gun, M64	AH-1G Cobra	M134 machine gun
Guided Missile Launcher, Helicopter Armament Subsystem, M65	AH-1E/F/P/Q/R/S Cobra	BGM-71 TOW missile
Armament Subsystem, Helicopter, Door Mounted, M93	UH-1F/P/N Iroquois	M134 machine gun
Armament Subsystem, Helicopter, Door Mounted, M94	UH-1F/P/N Iroquois	M134 machine gun or M129 grenade launcher
Armament Subsystem, Helicopter, 20-MM Cannon, M97	AH-1E/F/P Cobra	M197 electric cannon
Armament Subsystem, Helicopter, M120	AH-1 Cobra	M134, M60C machine gun or XM140 cannon, XM188, M197 electric cannon
Armament Subsystem, Helicopter, M139	AH-64 Apache	M230 chain gun and Mk 66 Wrap-Around Fin Aerial Rocket (WAFAR)

== Transport and utility helicopters ==
=== UH-1 Iroquois ===
- XM3, XM3E1/M3, and TLSS

The M3, sometimes referred to as "Aerial Rocket Artillery" (ARA), consisted of two 2.75" 24-Tube rocket launchers, one on either side of the aircraft, along with a Mk 8 sight. The launchers fired in pairs, one from each side to prevent the aircraft from becoming off balance. M3 systems were attached to the helicopter using Bell designed stores racks. The only difference between the XM3 and XM3E1 was that the launch tubes on the E1 were 4" longer. The XM3E1 was standardized as the M3.

A subvariant of the M3 system was developed in 1964 by the US Army Limited War Laboratory that allowed equipped helicopters to produce a protective smoke screen. Called the "Troop Landing Smoke Screen" (TLSS), the system used modified M3 launch racks to dispense M8 smoke grenades. This system was later tested using M6 and M7 riot control grenades.

- XM5/M5

The XM5/M5 system consists of a nose turret for a single 40mm M75 grenade launcher. The mount was fully flexible and controlled by the pilot via a hand-controlled sight electronically linked to the turret. The system either provided 150 or 302 rounds of ammunition. This system was also part of the armament kit for the ACH-47A.

- M6 Series

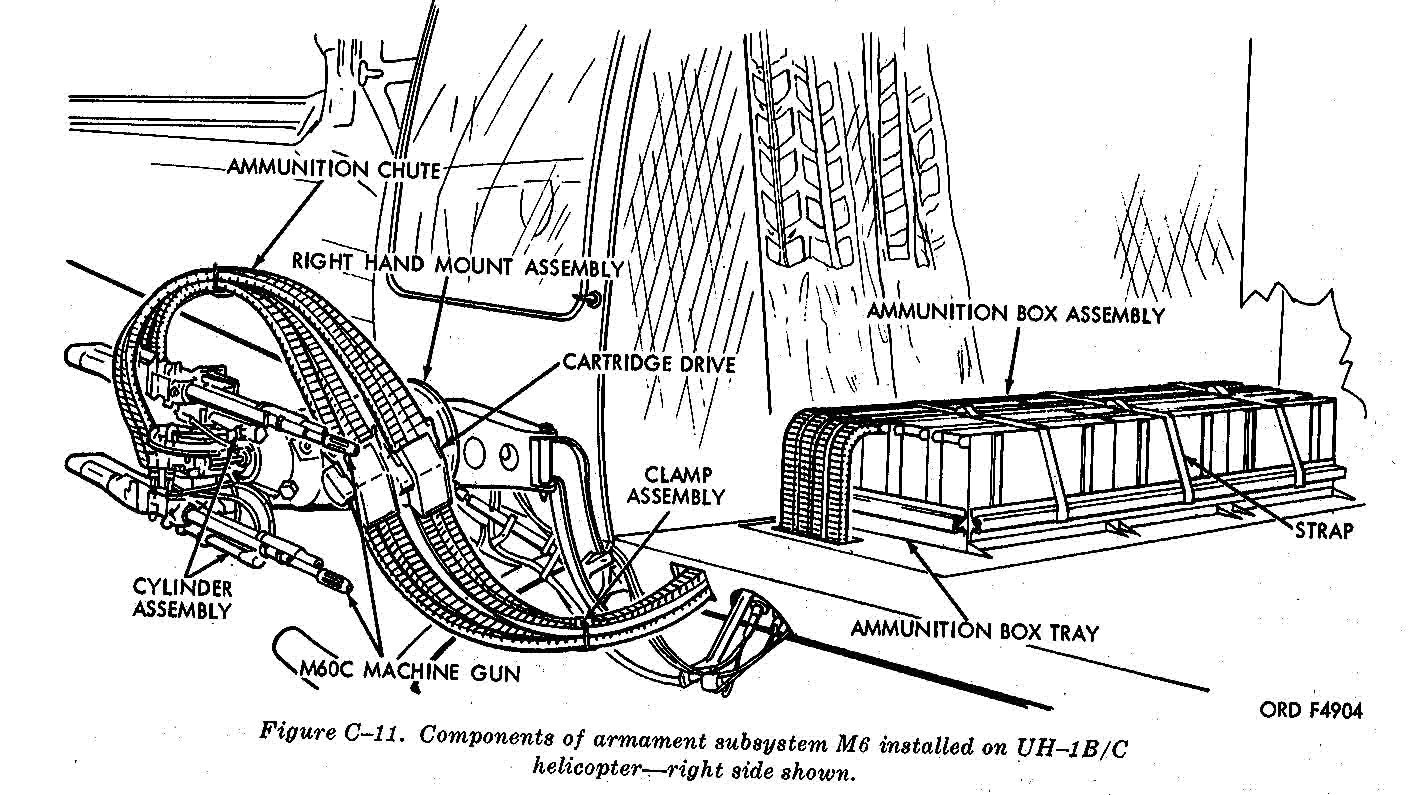
M6 Armament Subsystem on the UH-1B/C

The M6 system was one of the first systems to make use of the XM156/M156 universal mount, providing two M60C 7.62×51mm machine guns on either side of the helicopter. This system would later be expanded upon, but initially gave the UH-1 increased firepower and an improved offensive system over the skid mounts originally used.

The various development stages of the M6 system mainly had to do with the "station" to which the M156 mount was attached. The position of the XM6 is not stated, but the XM6E2 was fitted to "station 69" (likely forward of the main cabin) and the XM6E3 was fitted to "station 136." Since the XM6E3 was standardized as the M6, "station 136" is assumed to be the aft of main cabin position that would become standard for M156 based systems.

Some M6 systems were coupled the four guns with four MA-2/A 2.75" 2-Tube rocket launchers on each side of the aircraft, giving an even greater punch. This arrangement was later supplanted by the XM16/M16 system.

- XM9

A variant of the XM6/M6 system, the XM9 substitutes the four M60C 7.62×51mm machine guns with two M75 grenade launchers, one on either side of the aircraft.

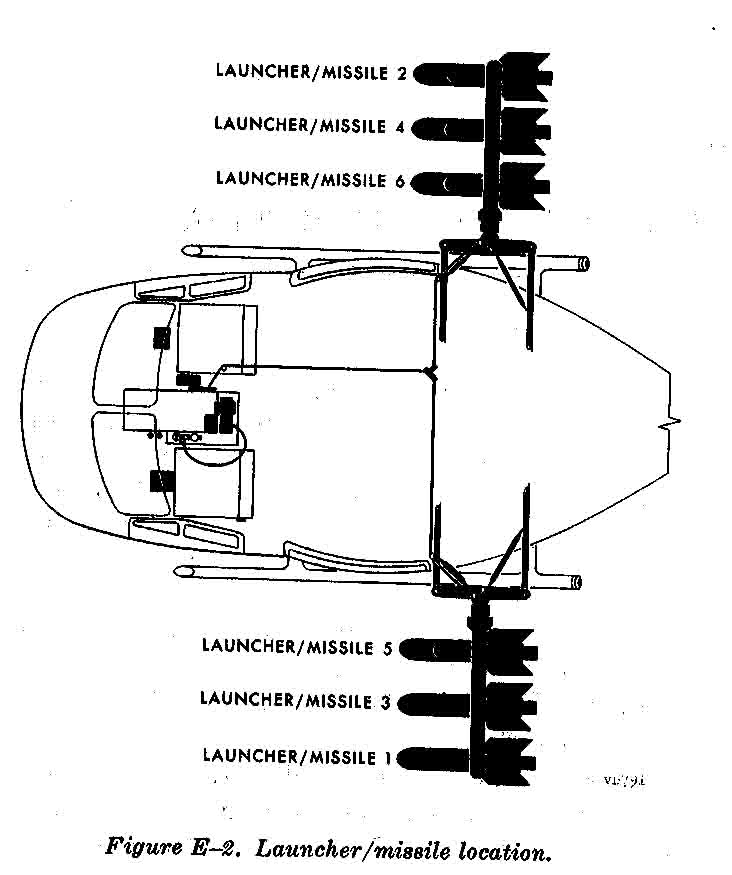
M22 Armament Subsystem technical schematic

- XM11, XM22/M22, and the Maxwell System

Both of these armament systems were designed to allow the UH-1 to fire the AGM-22 missile. Sources claim that the XM11 provided an XM70 sight and support racks for 6 missiles, three on each side of the aircraft. However, US Army FM 1-40 says that the XM11 designation was unassigned.

The M22 was an improvement providing a more specific sight, the XM58, and using the XM156 universal mount. The M22 also provided for a total of 6 missiles, three on each side of the aircraft. The XM11 is associated with the standard SS.11 missiles (AGM-22A), while the XM22/M22 system was designed around the US upgraded AGM-22B missiles.

The Maxwell System was a hybrid system designed by Warrant Officer Robert Maxwell as a field modification. Maxwell's unit had been sent both the M3 and XM11 systems, and he noticed that often aircraft with the M3 system returned after only firing half or less than half of their total rocket load. By removing one or two banks of rockets (and reducing the total carried to 12 or 18 total rockets versus 24) and adding a single launching mount for an AGM-22 missile he effectively gave the aircraft both suppression and point attack capabilities. The general lack of point targets in South East Asia meant that SS.11/AGM-22 missile saw very limited use in general.

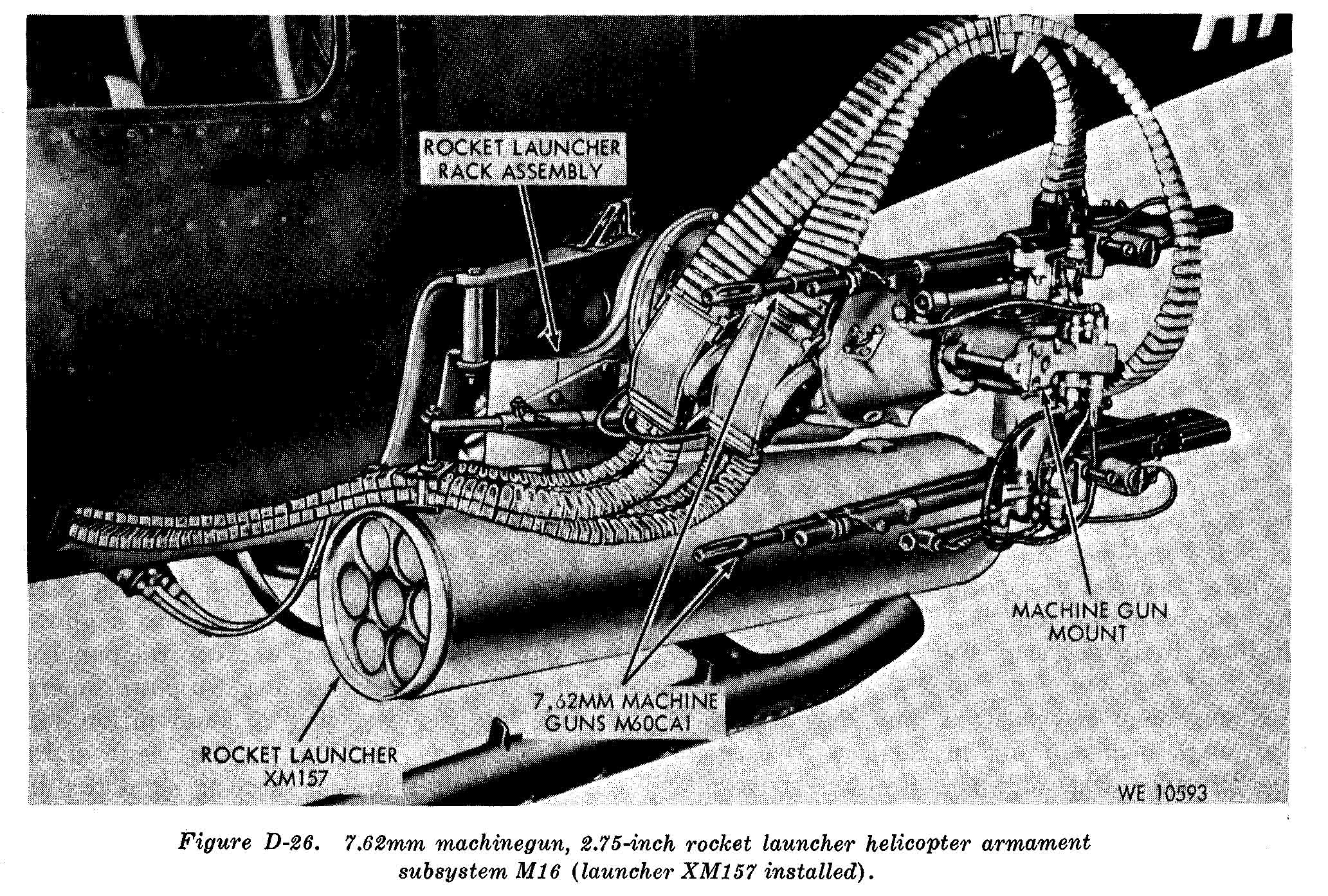
M16 Armament Subsystem with XM157 rocket launcher

- XM16/M16

The XM16/M16 system mated the previous M6 with either two M157 or two M158 2.75" 7-Tube rocket launchers utilizing the M156 Universal Mount. Sighting was accomplished by using the M60 series reflex sight. The combined weight and aircraft limitations meant that only seven-tube launchers could be used.

- XM17

The XM17 utilized "Kellet pylons" to mount two XM159 2.75" rocket launchers, one on each side of the aircraft.

- XM21/M21

A further variation on what had essentially become a basic system, the XM21/M21 subsystem replaced the XM16/M16's four M60Cs with two M134 7.62×51mm Miniguns.

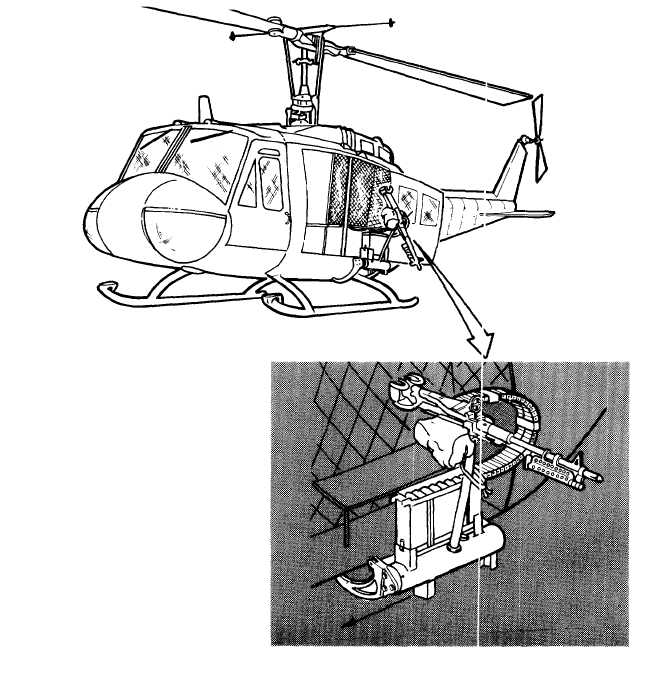
M23 Armament Subsystem on the UH-1D

- XM23/M23

The M23 system provides a pintle mount at both main cabin doors for an M60D 7.62×51mm machine gun, with the weapon feeding from either a standard ammunition box or a larger purpose built box connected to the mount. The M23 is specifically designed for long fuselage UH-1s (UH-1D/H/N).

- XM26

With the development of the BGM-71 TOW missile Hughes had been given the contract to develop a launching system for the UH-1. By 1968 development had shifted over to development of a system for the AH-56 helicopter which was eventually canceled. The XM26 provided two 3-Tube launchers on either side of the aircraft, as well as the necessary sighting equipment. While the XM26 was more of a test platform, the two prototypes were deployed operationally as an emergency measure in South Vietnam to counter the Easter Invasion in 1972.

- XM29 and the Sagami Mount

The XM29 was an experimental door pintle for the main cabin doors of short fuselage UH-1s (at the time the UH-1B/C), for an M60D 7.62×51mm machine gun. The problem with this system was that it could not be used in conjunction with external armament subsystems.

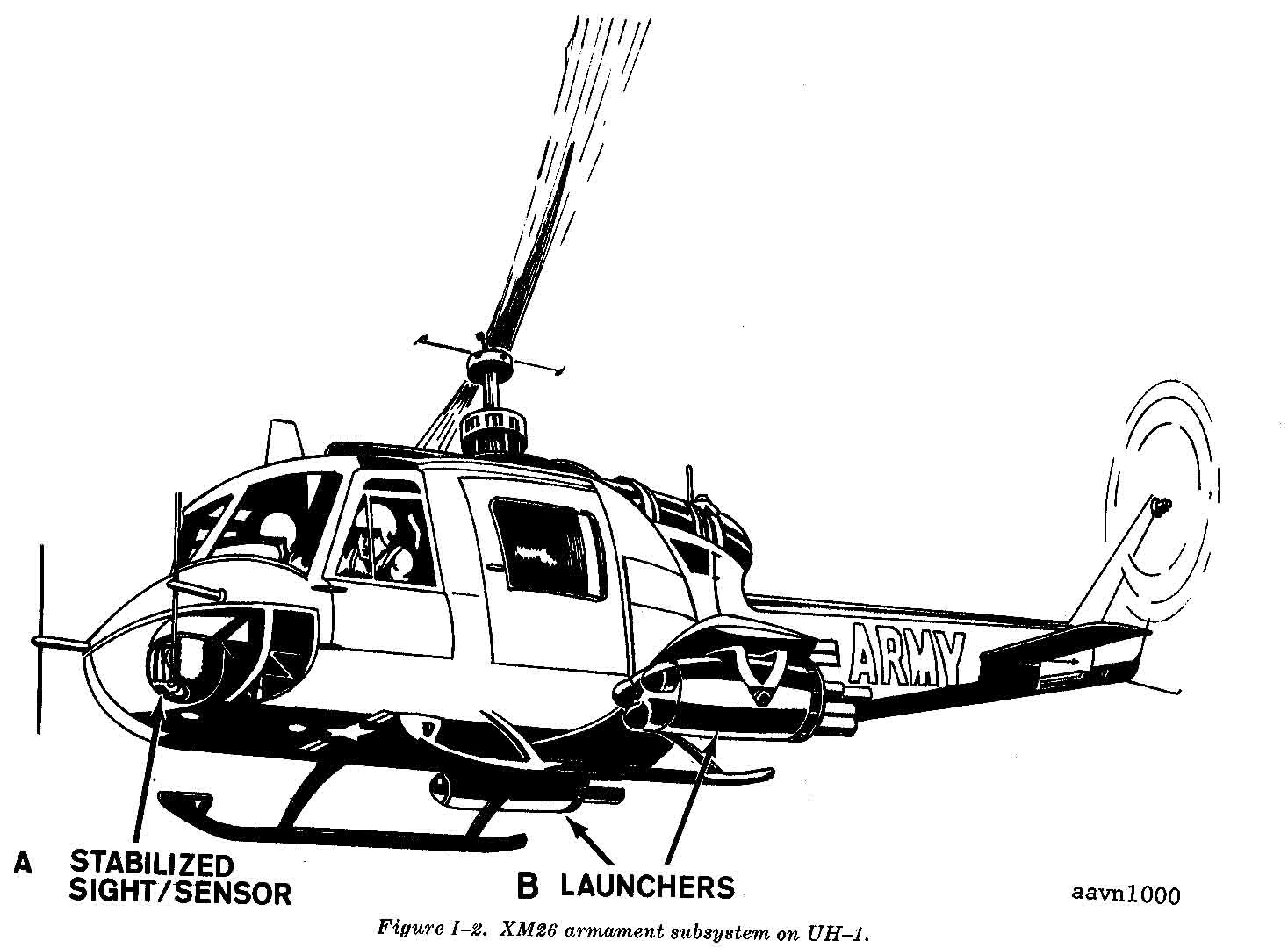
Drawing of the XM26 Armament Subsystem on the UH-1B helicopter

Far more common on such helicopters, including the later UH-1F/P/M specifically, was the Sagami Mount, a skeleton frame mount that swung out from a fixed position at the rear of the cabin. This mount was designed for the M60D, but in certain instances, primarily by the US Navy Seawolves, dual M60 machine guns, M2HB machine guns or M134 Miniguns were fitted.

Sources debate the origin of the "Sagami" name, with it being attributed to the soldier responsible for its creation, as well as, to the name of the US facility on Okinawa where it was developed.

- XM30

An experimental system, the XM30 provided fully flexible mounts using the XM156/M156 universal mounts for two XM140 30mm cannon, with 600 rounds of ammunition per gun.

- XM31

Another attempt to up the firepower from existing systems, the XM31 provided two M24A1 20mm cannon in pods fitted to XM156/M156 universal mounts each with 600 rounds of ammunition, and flexible in elevation only.

- XM50

XM50 is a designation for the combination of the XM5/M5 and the XM21/M21 armament subsystems, a common configuration used by US forces in South East Asia.

- M56

A mine dispenser system for the UH-1H helicopter, the M56 is composed of two SUU-13D/A dispensers on the M156 Universal Mount, which is reinforced to handle the additional weight.

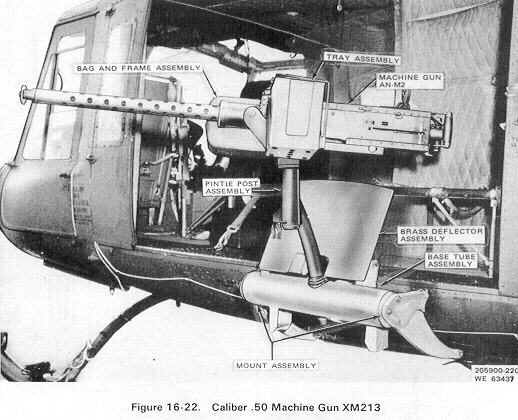
XM59 Armament Subsystem with the XM213 machine gun on the UH-1D helicopter

- XM59/M59

A variation on the M23, the XM59/M59 was modified to accept either an XM213/M213 .50 caliber machine gun or an XM175 40 mm grenade launcher in addition to being able to mount the M60 machine gun.

- XM93/XM93E1

This armament subsystem provides door mounts for long fuselage UH-1s (UH-1D/H/N) for two M134 7.62×51mm Miniguns. The USAF also used this system on their short fuselage UH-1F/P helicopters. These weapons are equipped with chutes connected to their ejection ports that directs spent cases and links away from the aircraft.

The XM93E1 is a variation on the system that allows both guns to be trained forward and remotely fired by the pilot using the M60 series of reflex sights. The USAF was the primary user of this system and often combined it with two 7-Tube 2.75" rocket launchers of varying types on two independent support rack and pylon assemblies.

- XM94

A variant of the XM93, the XM94 substitutes the M129 40 mm grenade launcher for one or both of the door mounted M134 7.62×51mm Miniguns.

- XM156/M156

Not technically an armament subsystem, the XM156/M156 universal mount provided mounting supports and racks for a number of systems used on the UH-1 series of helicopters.

- A/A49E-3

Similar to the US Army XM93, this system type classified by the Air Force uses mounts similar to those used in the M23 system mounting two M134 7.62×51mm Miniguns at each of the main cabin doors of the UH-1N helicopters. This system is likely suitable for other long-fuselage UH-1 types.

- A/A49E-11

Referred to as the Defensive Armament System or DAS, this system is composed of two mounts for GAU-15/A and GAU-16/A .50 caliber machine guns or GAU-17/A 7.62×51mm Miniguns, as well as, two BRU-20/A or BRU-21/A bomb racks for current 2.75" rocket launchers. This system was also designed primarily for use with the UH-1N helicopter (and is in use with the US Marine Corps as well in this capacity), but is likely suitable for other long-fuselage UH-1 types.

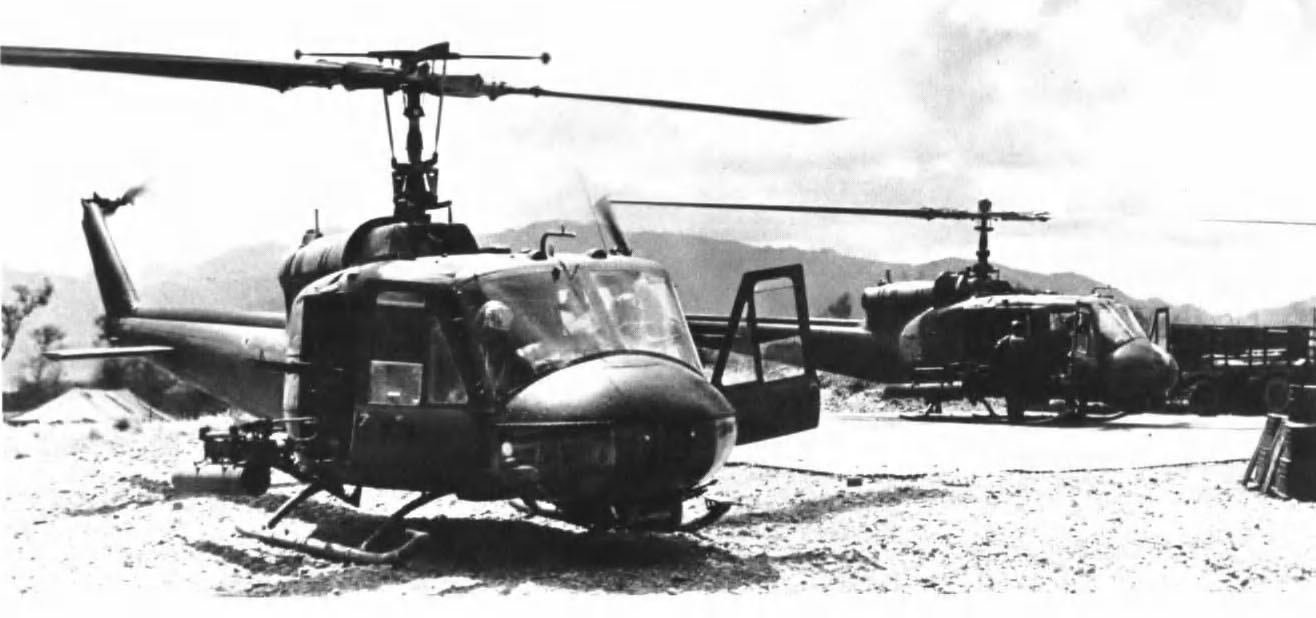
Two UH-1E helicopters with TK-2 Armament Subsystems and TAT-101 turrets

- TK-2

A variant of the TK-1 for the CH-34/UH-34 helicopter, the TK-2 (Temporary Kit-2) was developed by the USMC for their UH-1E helicopter. The system provides the same four M60C 7.62×51mm machine guns as the TK-1, but adds two independent support rack and pylon assemblies to the system, for mounting an acceptable aircraft style armament. Typically these mounts were used for 7-Tube 2.75" rocket launchers of varying types, but were also seen tested with XM18/M18 Minigun pods (USAF SUU-11/A).

- Emerson TAT-101

Unique to USMC UH-1E helicopters between April 1967 and 1972 was the use of the Emerson Electric TAT-101 (Tactical Armament Turret-101) nose turret. The turret housed two M60 machine guns with 1000 rounds total, and had 100 degrees in azimuth left or right, plus 15 degrees of elevation and 45 degrees of depression. The slew-rate on the turret was 45 degrees per second. Jamming and the need for maintenance led to the turret's front fairing being left off to assist ground crews in quickly dealing with any problems, and these reasons combined in the USMC decision to drop the turrets from inventory entirely at the end of 1972.

- Emerson Mini-TAT

Developed to a Canadian requirement for their Bell UH-1N Twin Huey, the Mini-TAT replaced the M60s with a minigun. A number of these were loaned to the US Army for use during the famous J-CATCH experiments in the late 1970s.

=== SH-3/HH-3A Sea King (Sikorsky S-61) ===
Emerson TAT-102C

A version of the TAT-102 (Tactical Armament Turret-102) designed specifically for use on the HH-3A helicopter, the TAT-102C mounted a single M134 Minigun in a fully traversable turret (for specifics see the TAT-102A in the AH-1 Cobra entry). Two such turrets were mounted on sponsons, one on each side of the aircraft. The complexity and questionable performance in the environment led to them being removed in favor of more conventional door mounted weaponry.

=== CH-3E Sea King/HH-3E Jolly Green Giant (Sikorsky S-61R) ===
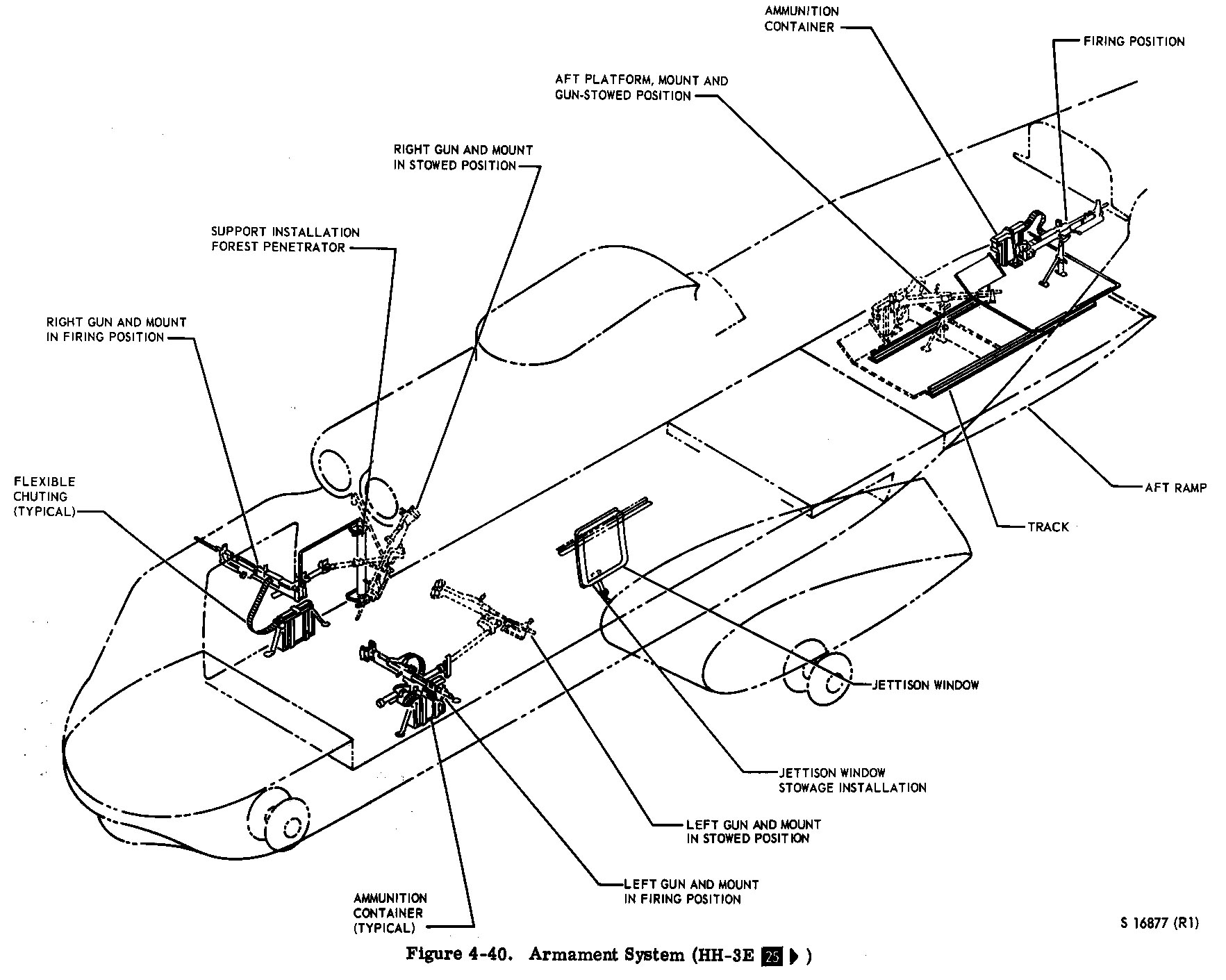
Diagram of HH-3E w/ M60D machine guns fitted to the three stations

The defensive armament system for the USAF's H-3E helicopters is described as standard to the HH-3E, and capable of being fitted as required to the CH-3E. The basic system comprises three M60 machine guns, one each at the forward door, the opposite emergency window, and the rear loading ramp. The forward two positions comprise pintle mounts on skate rails, while the rear loading ramp station comprises a pedestal mount on an armored floor plate. The floor plate slides on two tracks, forward and back, to and from its firing position at the edge of the ramp. Either the standard infantry M60 can be used, with standard 200-round ammunition boxes attached, or the M60D variant, feeding via flexible ammunition chutes from 750-round boxes fixed to the floor (or to the armored floor plate for the rear loading ramp position).

=== CH-21 Shawnee ===
- XM153

Described as a system of four forward firing M60 machine guns similar to the later M6 series for the UH-1 helicopter. Not standardized.

- Offensive armament

Experiments were done using CH-21s with both fixed forward M2HB .50 caliber machine guns and forward firing rocket launchers. Neither system was standardized, but both paved the way for similar systems on later helicopter types.

- Defensive armament

UTTHCO deployed with a number of CH-21's, and experimented with field expedient bars mated to the cargo doors, fitted with M37C .30-06 machine guns and feed from boxes mounted on top of the weapon.

Note: It would appear that similar mounts were fabricated for use with early UH-1s as well.

=== UH-34/CH-34 Choctaw/Seahorse ===
- XM4

Described simply as a "2.75-inch rocket launcher subsystem for the CH-34," there is no information as to how many rockets the XM4 was capable of launching.

- XM6E1

For more information on the M6 Series see the UH-1 entry in this article. The XM6E1 was a variation of the XM6 for use with the CH-34 helicopter.

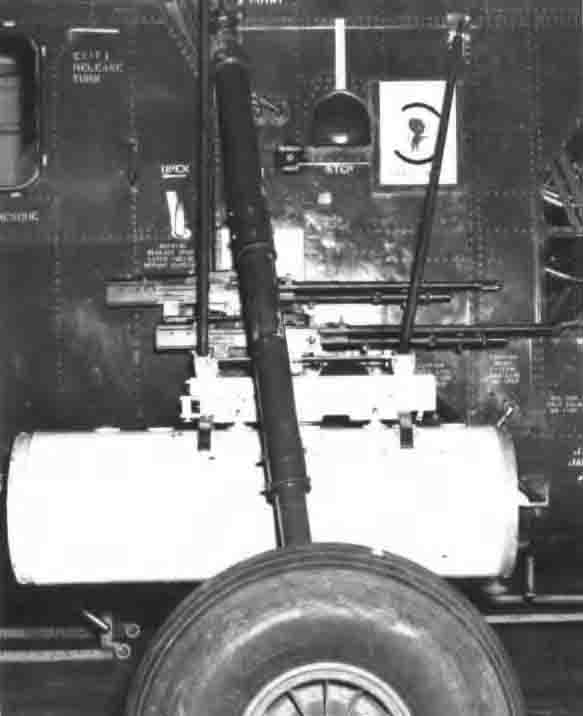
TK-1 Armament Subsystem on the UH-34D helicopter

- TK-1

A USMC weapon system to provide H-34 helicopters with offensive armament, the TK-1 (Temporary Kit-1) featured two M60C 7.62×51mm machine guns, fixed forward on the right side of the aircraft, with ammunition fed out from boxes inside the aircraft. Also attached to these assemblies were two pylons, fitted with 19-shot 2.75-inch rocket launchers. Aircraft equipped with the TK-1 were sometimes referred to as "Stingers."

- AGM-12 Bullpup

The H-34 could carry the AGM-12 Bullpup for precision guided attacks on ground targets. Due to simple nature of the Bullpup, it could be mounted on many platforms, and the H-34 was one of them.

- Defensive Armament

Both the US Army and the USMC developed pintle mounts for use in the main cargo door and opposite window, mounting a single infantry type M60 7.62×51mm machine gun (sometimes referred to as "M60A"), allowing the crew chief to fire the weapon while seated on the opposite side. The USMC tested mounting the heavier M2 machine gun, but found the vibration when firing to be detrimental to the aircraft. In all the mounts were imperfect as they blocked easy entry and exit from the main cabin.

=== CH-46 Sea Knight ===
- Defensive Armament

The CH-46E Sea Knight has the ability to mount the XM-218 .50 caliber heavy machine gun. On the left side of the helicopter it is mounted in the AO's (Aerial Observer) window just behind the copilots seat. On the right side it is mounted in the Gunner's window just behind the crew door. The aircraft is also set up to carry a RMWS (Ramp Mounted Weapon System) which holds the M240D 7.62mm medium machine gun.

- XM-218

The XM-218, 0.50 caliber aircraft machine gun is a belt-fed, recoil-operated, air-cooled, alternate-feed weapon fired from the closed bolt position. It is capable of firing at a rapid rate of 750-850 rounds per minute.

- M240D

The M240D machine gun is a belt-fed, gas-operated, air-cooled, alternate-feed automatic weapon fired from the open bolt position. It has a rate of fire of 650-950 rounds per minute.

=== CH-47 Chinook and ACH-47A "Guns-a-GoGo" ===
M24

A defensive armament subsystem, the M24 provides a pintle mount for an M60D 7.62×51mm machine gun at either left or right front cargo doors on the CH-47. The system feeds from standard 200-round ammunition boxes attached to the weapon. The US Army phased out the M60D in favor of the M240D and subsequently M240H. While the mount system designation remains the same, the mount itself has been extensively redesigned to accommodate the ammunition magazine and a bag for catching expended ammunition casings and ammunition links, as well as an improved roller on the pintle to prevent excessive and premature wear to the mount assembly.

XM32

A defensive armament subsystem, the XM32 provides pintle mounts for either M60D 7.62×51mm machine guns or M2HB .50 caliber machine guns at both cargo door positions and at both rear emergency hatches of the CH-47 helicopter, with weapons feeding from standard ammunition boxes. This system was developed specifically for the ACH-47 helicopter.

XM33

A defensive armament subsystem, the XM33 provides a mount for either an M60D 7.62×51mm or an M2HB .50-caliber machine gun on the rear cargo ramp of the CH-47 helicopter. This system was developed specifically for the ACH-47 helicopter, with the weapon feeding from standard ammunition boxes.

XM34

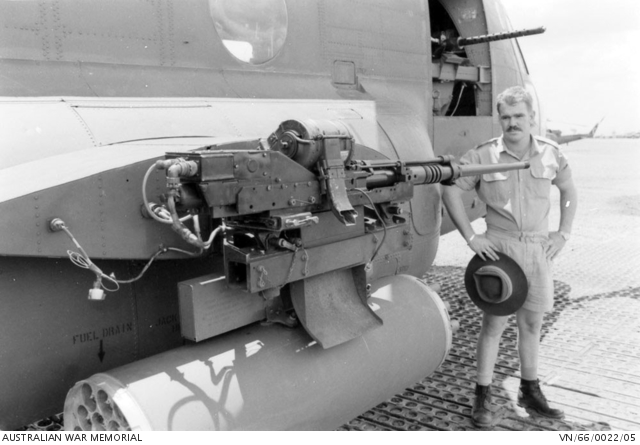
XM34 armament system on ACH-47A "Birth Control" at Vung Tau Air Base.

An offensive armament subsystem developed for the ACH-47 helicopter, the XM34 provides two M24A1 20mm cannons with ammunition boxes on sponsons at the front of the aircraft fixed forward. These sponsons were also fitted with aircraft-style hardpoints that allowed the mounting of XM159B/XM159C 19-tube 2.75"-rocket launchers or M18/M18A1 7.62×51mm gun pods.

XM41/M41

A defensive armament subsystem, the M41 provides a mount for an M60D 7.62×51mm machine gun on the rear cargo ramp of the CH-47 helicopter. The system feeds from standard 200-round ammunition boxes attached to the weapon. The US Army phased out the M60D in favor of the M240D and subsequently M240H, but it is unknown whether the necessity of a new cradle for the weapon (as with the M24 above) resulted in the system being redesignated. The mount is otherwise the same.

=== CH-53 Sea Stallion/HH-53/MH-53 Super Jolly/Pave Low/CH-53E Super Stallion/MH-53E Sea Dragon ===
Defensive armament systems for the H-53 series and developments as used by the US Navy have no known designation, but generally comprise pintle mounts at "personnel or cargo doors or windows of the aircraft." These mounts are usually equipped with either .50 caliber (12.7 mm) GAU-15/A, GAU-16/A, or GAU-18/A machine guns, or 7.62 mm M60D machine guns. The .50 caliber weapons were later supplanted by the .50 caliber GAU-21/A machine gun, which featured a higher rate of fire.

=== UH-60 Black Hawk/SH-60 Sea Hawk/HH-60 Jayhawk/HH-60/MH-60 Pave Hawk ===
- M139

The M139 Volcano is a mine dispenser system composed of racks on both sides of the aircraft for up to 40 Canister, Mine, M87. Each canister contains 6 GATOR Anti-Tank mine and 1 GATOR Anti-Personnel Mine.

- M144

The M144 is a defensive subsystem that provides mounts and cradles at the two windows between the pilot doors and the main cabin doors on the UH-60 series of helicopters, each mounting a single M60D 7.62×51mm machine gun. The US Army phased out the M60D in favor of the M240D and subsequently M240H, or M-134 Miniguns, but it is unknown whether the necessity of a new cradle for the weapon resulted in the system being redesignated. The mount is otherwise the same. The USAF equips its HH-60/MH-60 Pave Hawk with one or two GAU-15/A, GAU-16/A, or GAU-18/A .50 caliber machine guns, and or GAU-2 series 7.62mm NATO Miniguns. One .50 caliber machine gun might be mounted in the floor, firing out of an open door, while two 7.62mm NATO miniguns are mounted in the door gunner positions.

- ESSS

The External Stores Support System (ESSS) provides two stub wings each with two hard points primarily for external fuel tanks, but, it can also carry various weapon systems. When equipped with the Extended Range Fuel System (ERFS), the system can support two 870 L (230 gal) or 1,700 L (450 gal) external tanks. The system feeds into the main fuel tank and not the engines directly. The ESSS can also be fitted with a wide range of weapons including up to sixteen AGM-114 Hellfire missiles, rockets and gun pods, and other systems.

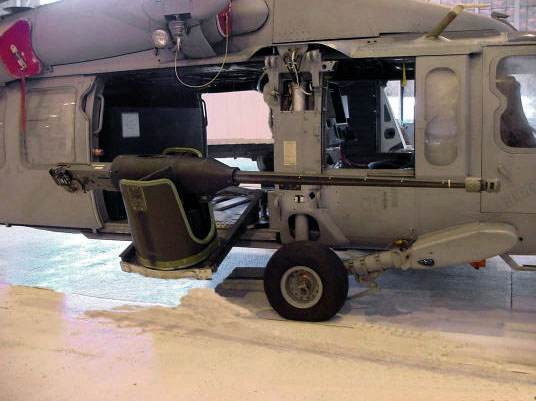
Prototype RAMICS gun and mount on an MH-60S helicopter

- AN/AWS-2 RAMICS

The Rapid Airborne Mine Clearance System (RAMICS) can be considered an armament subsystem (and one of the largest guns ever fitted to a helicopter), though its intended targets are strictly naval mines. Consisting of a single modified Mk 44 Mod 0 30mm cannon firing the Mk 248 Mod 1 Armor-Piercing Fin-Stabilized Discarding-Sabot Tracer (APFSDS-T) round, the RAMICS was intended to be mounted in the cabin of the MH-60S helicopter, and using its associated sensor package, target and neutralize mines at relatively shallow depths. The system is designed to provide a quick and effective mine clearance capability to complement existing methods and others under development for the Navy's Airborne Mine Countermeasures (AMCM) Program. In 2018 it was announced that RAMICS was cancelled "because of poor performance in early testing, incompatibility with MH-60s, and programmatic decision to upgrade Airborne Mine Neutralization System (AMNS) to perform near-surface mine neutralization mission"

== Observation and other light helicopters ==
=== HH-2C Seasprite ===
Emerson TAT-102K

A version of the TAT-102 (Tactical Armament Turret-102) designed specifically for use on the HH-2C helicopter, the TAT-102K mounted a single M134 Minigun in a fully traversable turret (for specifics see the information for the TAT-102A in the AH-1 Cobra entry). A single such turret would mounted in the nose of the aircraft. The weight of the mount was not suitable for such a small helicopter and the turret was often removed.

=== OH-6 Cayuse (and MD 500 Defender) ===
XM7

The XM7 system provided twin M60 machine gun on the Hughes OH-6 Cayuse series of helicopters. It is unclear if both guns were mounted together or whether they were mounted one on each side of the aircraft. As of 1969 the system was listed with the comment "development suspended," likely in favor of the XM27. This system was also tested on the YOH-5A during August 1964.

XM8

The XM8 system provides a mount for one M129 40mm grenade launcher for either the OH-6 or OH-58 light observation helicopters. The system is provided with an XM70/E1 sight and 150 rounds of ammunition. The XM8's mount is interchangeable with the M27 system.

This system could also be mounted on the OH-58 Kiowa, and was tested on the YOH-5A during August 1964.

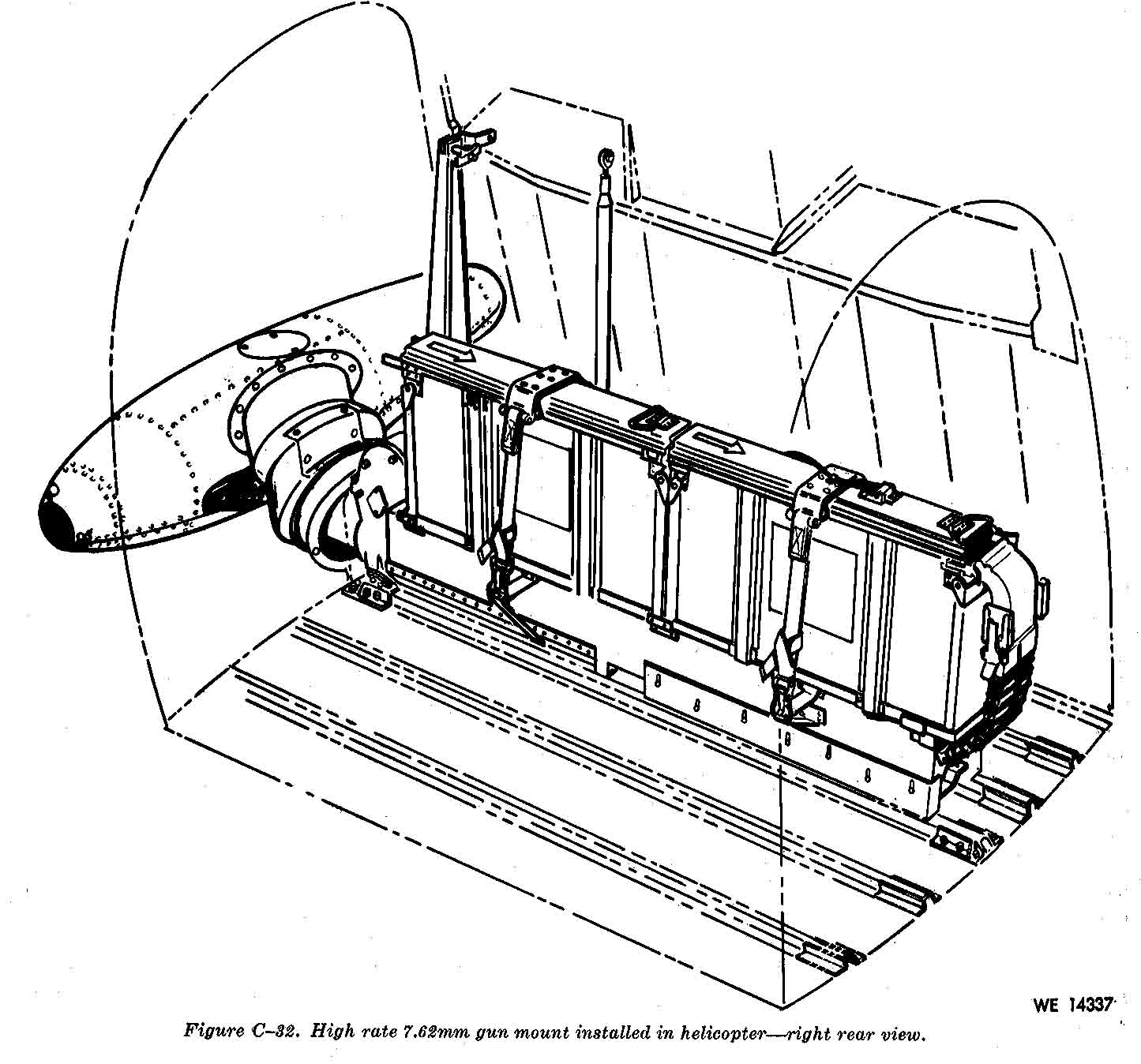
Schematic of the XM27 on the OH-6A helicopter

M27 Series

The M27 system provides a mount for one M134 7.62×51mm machine gun (Minigun) for either the OH-6 or OH-58 light observation helicopters. The system is provided with an XM70/E1 sight and a MAU-56/A delinking feeder with 2000 rounds of ammunition. The system has no movement in azimuth, but has 10 degrees of elevation and 24 degrees of depression.

The initial XM27 featured a mount similar to a gunpod, which was quickly exchanged for a more aerodynamic fairing, as well as improvements to the ammunition stowage and other equipment on the XM27E1. The XM27E1 was standardized as the M27. The fairing was removed entirely because for ease of maintenance and to reduce weight on the M27E1. The M27's mount is interchangeable with the XM8 system. As with the XM8, this system can also be mounted on the OH-58 Kiowa.

HGS-55

Using a mount similar to that used on the XM8 and M27 series, the HGS-55 was developed by the McDonnell Douglas Helicopter Company (formerly Hughes Helicopters) to use the EX 34 Mod 0 7.62×51mm chain gun. The weapon is supplied with a 2,000-round magazine, and the weapon fires between 550 and 700 rounds per minute. This system was not adopted by the US military for use, and no export sales were known to have been made.

=== OH-13 Sioux and OH-23 Raven ===
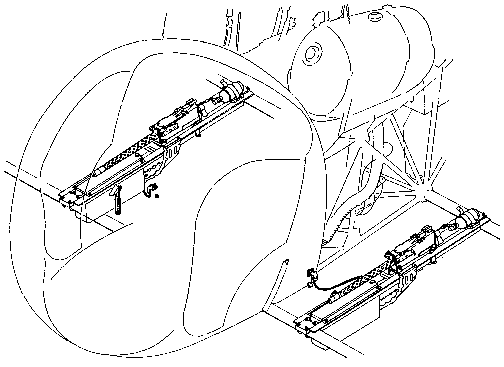
XM1 on the OH-13

XM1/XM1E1

In service between 1960 and 1972, the XM1 consisted of two .30-06 M37C machine guns mounted on the landing skids of either the OH-13 or OH-23 helicopter. These weapons were fixed forward, but flexible in elevation, with their ammunition (500 rounds per gun) stored externally. The XM1E1 was the product engineering design. What would appear to have been a variant of the XM1 system was used by UTTHCO on their HU-1As (later UH-1A) for a short period.

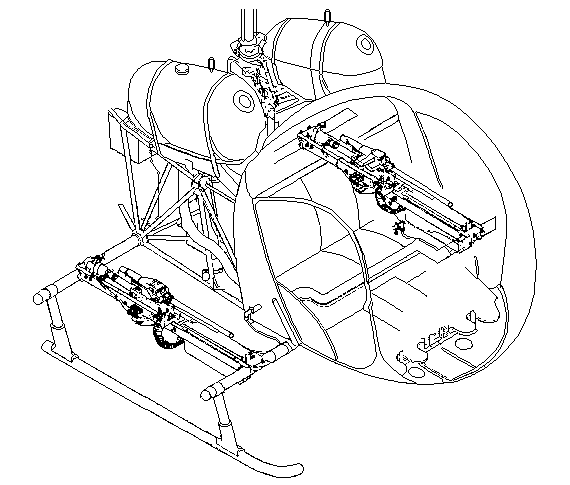
M2 on the OH-13

M2

The M2 system was a variation on the XM1, replacing the .30-caliber M37C machine guns with 7.62×51mm NATO M60C machine guns. The mounts were similar to the XM1, also providing flexible elevation, with 650 rounds per gun stored externally.

=== AH-58D/OH-58D Kiowa Warrior ===
Universal Weapons Pylon and Gun Pod

The Universal Weapons Pylon is specific to the OH-58D Kiowa Warrior helicopter, and provides two support racks for various weapon systems. The racks, with stores mounted, may be folded 180 degrees upward for rapid loading into the C-130 transport aircraft, though the connecting umbilicals must be disconnected to prevent damage.

There are at least ten authorized armament configurations, which involve a mix of a system specific gun pod mounting the M296 .50 caliber machine gun (left side only), the M260 7-shot 2.75in/70mm Lightweight Launcher (LWL), the M279 2-rail AGM-114 Hellfire launcher, or a 2-shot Air-to-Air Stinger (ATAS) launcher. The gun pod is fed from a semi-external magazine loaded with 500 rounds of linked ammunition.

=== MH-65C Dolphin and MH-68A Stingray ===
Airborne Use of Force (AUF) Package

The US Coast Guard has deployed the MH-68A to its newly created Helicopter Interdiction Tactical Squadron (HITRON), and it is the only helicopter in USCG inventory specifically tasked with the Airborne Use of Force (AUF) mission. These helicopters feature a defensive armament system composed of a single M240G machine gun mounted at the port cabin door, along with a Robar Arms RC-50 rifle attached to the cabin via a bungee cord for disabling hostile light vessels. The kit is also capable of being used on the HH-65C aircraft. When so fitted the aircraft is designated MH-65C.

== Attack helicopters ==
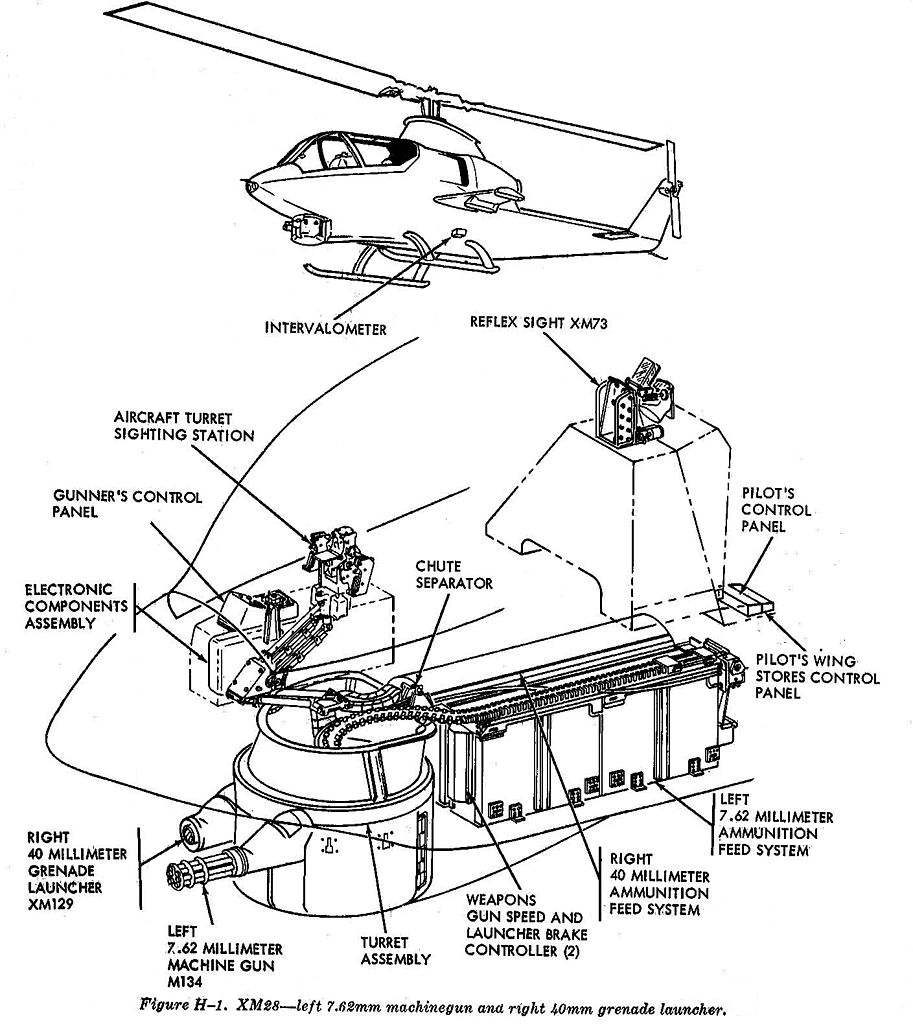
Schematic of the XM28, with XM129 grenade launcher on the right station and M134 machine gun on the left station, on the AH-1G helicopter

=== AH-1 Cobra ===
M28 Series (Emerson TAT-141)

The standard fixed armament for the Bell AH-1 Cobra AH-1G, AH-1P (formerly referred to as AH-1S Production), AH-1Q, and initial AH-1S models, this turret unit is similar to the XM64, but was capable of mounting two M134 Miniguns, two M129 40 mm grenade launchers, or one of each weapon. Miniguns fitted are capable of pre-set firing rates of either 2,000 or 4,000 RPM, while the turret itself has 114 degrees of motion left or right, 17.5 degrees of elevation and 50 degrees of depression (alternate sources describe 110 degrees in azimuth, 20 degrees of elevation and 50 degrees of depression for the M28E1 model specifically). Each Minigun is linked to 4,000 rounds of ammunition while each grenade launcher is fed from a 300-round magazine.

The system is known to have four standard A variants, the M28/A1-A3. However, the actual specifics between variants is vague. The available information suggests that specific variants were mated to specific iterations of the AH-1 helicopter. The initial XM28/M28 were fitted to the AH-1G, as were the M28E1/M28A1. The M28A1E1/M28A2 was fitted to the AH-1Q, while the M28A3 (no developmental variation known) was fitted to the AH-1P/S helicopter. There is the possibility that the M28A2 could have been the first unit designed to work with the XM128/M128 Helmet Sight System (HSS) developed primarily for use with TOW armed AH-1s.

XM35/M35

An armament subsystem providing a single M195 20 mm cannon on the port inboard pylon of the AH-1G. 950 rounds of ammunition were stored in boxes faired to the side of the aircraft. The system was primarily pilot controlled, but featured dual controls to be either pilot or gunner controlled. For this purpose the pilot was provided with a M73 sight.

XM64 (Emerson TAT-102A)

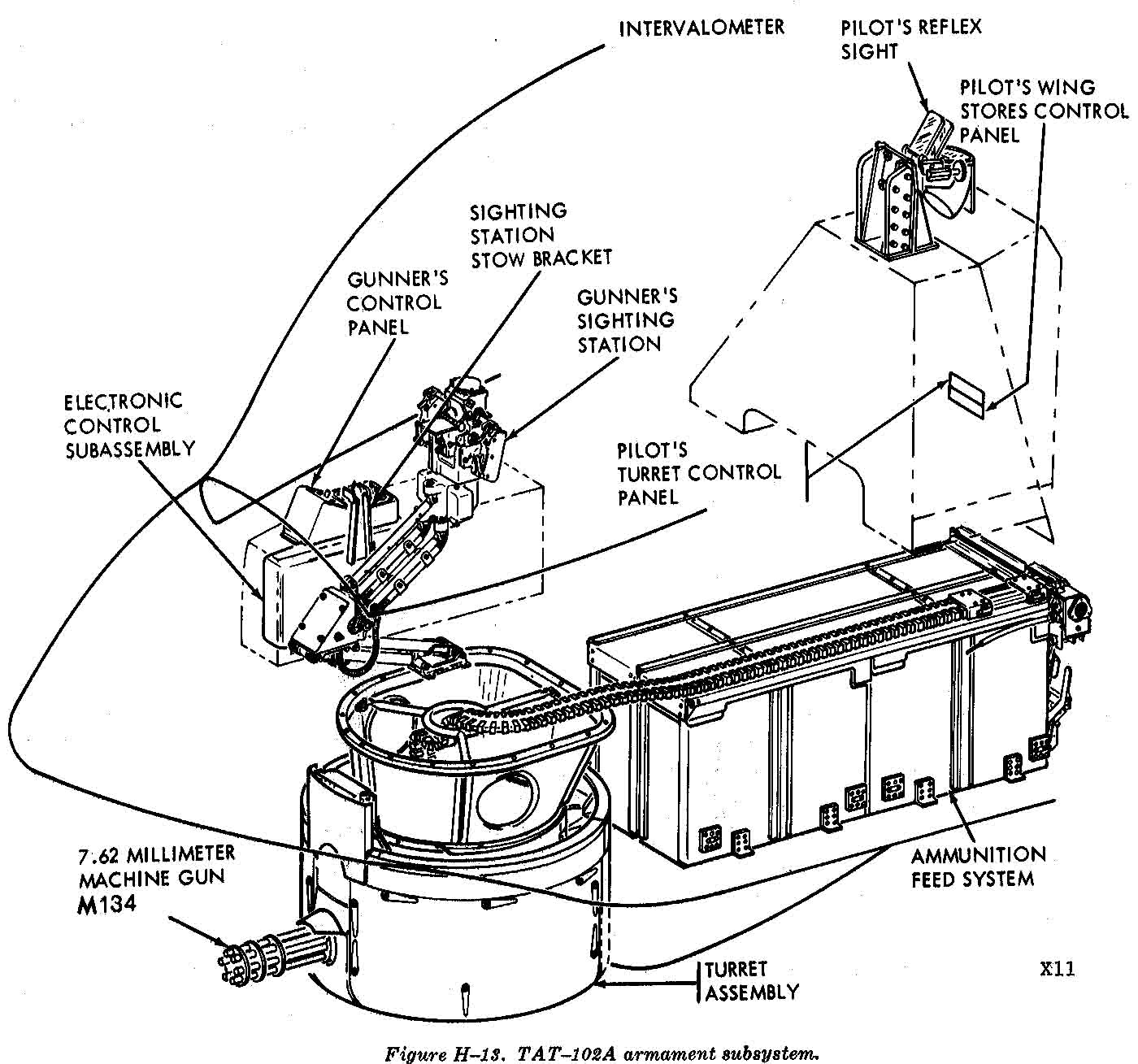
Schematic of the Emerson TAT-102A on the AH-1G helicopter

The TAT-102A (Tactical Armament Turret-102A) was the initial main armament for the AH-1G helicopter, though designed as an interim measure. It is related to the TAT-101 mentioned in the UH-1 entry. The turret mounts a single M134 Minigun with 25 degrees of elevation, 90 degrees of depression, and 180 degrees of motion in azimuth, with a slew rate of 80 degrees per second. The TAT-102A was designated XM64 by the US Army.

XM65/M65

The Cobra Missile System is a functional development of the XM26 and the TOW missile system developed for the failed AH-56 helicopter. Originally designed for the AH-1Q and AH-1S Cobras, the AH-1F Modernized Cobra was also rebuilt to use the system. The original iteration of the system comprises launchers allowing for four BGM-71 TOW missiles per aircraft pylon to be carried, and a "Telescopic Sight Unit" (TSU), to allow for targeting and guidance of the missile. The TSU has been upgraded with the LAAT (Laser-Augmented Airborne TOW), a day/night range finder, and C-NITE (Cobra-Night Imaging Thermal Equipment), a thermal imagine/FLIR system specifically for the AH-1S and AH-1F Cobra helicopters.

M97 Series and A/A49E-7 (GE Universal Turret)

The standard fixed armament system for the US Army's AH-1S Upgunned Cobra (eventually redesignated AH-1E Enhanced Cobra Armament System or ECAS) and the AH-1S Modernized Cobra (eventually redesignated the AH-1F), as well as, the US Marine Corps' AH-1J, AH-1T, AH-1W, and AH-1Z helicopters. The system was designed to fit either the M197 20 mm three barreled cannon or the XM188 30 mm three barreled cannon. In practice the M197 was the standard fit and the XM188 was not adopted for service. The turret has 110 degrees of motion in azimuth, 21 degrees of elevation, and 50 degrees of depression, with a slew rate in azimuth of 80 degrees per second and in elevation and depression of 60 degrees per second.

As with the M28 series, the specifics between variants of the M97 are vague. Five Standard A models are known to exist, M97/A1-A4. Sources suggest that individual variants of the turret were specific to certain variants of the AH-1 as with the M28 series. The M97A1 (and possibly the M97) was fitted to the AH-1S Upgunned Cobra, the M97A2/A3 to the AH-1S Modernized Cobra (AH-1F), and the M97A4 to production AH-1Fs. Other sources say that the M97A3 was refitted to AH-1E ECAS and the M97A2 was the initial armament for the AH-1S Modernized Cobra, agreeing that the M97A1 was the original fit to the AH-1S Upgunned Cobra. There is also the possibility that the differences have something to do with the associated equipment for the M197 cannon, including the use of the M89 or M89E1 delinking feeder.

The M97 was also fitted to the AH-1J, but it is unclear if the AH-1T, AH-1W, and AH-1Z used variants of the M97 series. The subsystem used on the AH-1T and AH-1W has a designation in the USAF's Aeronautical and Support Equipment Type Designation System (ASETDS), A/A49E-7. The turret in the system is also designated under the ASETDS system, as the GTU-1/A. How this system differs from its US Army counterparts is unknown. An amendment to the official Military Specification, MIL-F-85668(AS), put out by the United States Naval Air Systems Command on 15 November 1995, actually listed the "A/A49E-7(V4)" as inactive pending a new design, and listed the system as relevant only to the "AH-1T (TOW)."

XM120 (Emerson TAT-140)

A competing universal turret design to the M97 put forward by Emerson Electric, the XM120 could be fitted with a number of weapons including the M60C 7.62×51mm machine gun, M134 Minigun, M197 20 mm three barreled cannon, XM188 30 mm three barreled cannon, and was in fact tested with the XM140 30 mm cannon.

=== AH-56 Cheyenne ===
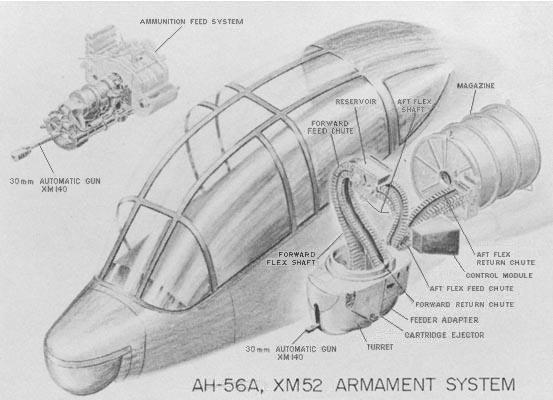
XM52 Armament Subsystem on the AH-56A helicopter

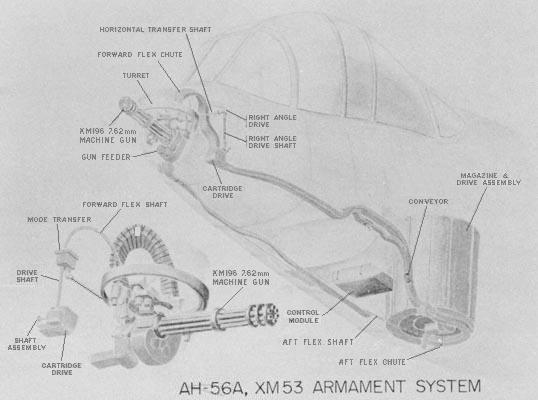
XM53 Armament Subsystem on the AH-56A helicopter

The Lockheed AH-56 Cheyenne got no further than operational testing of the ten prototypes before the program was cancelled.

XM51
A nose turret with one M129 40 mm grenade launcher with 300 rounds. In light of the cancellation of the AH-56 was proposed as a replacement for the M5 system on the UH-1 helicopter. Designed to be interchangeable with the XM53.
XM52
Belly turret with a single XM140 30 mm cannon. Use on other helicopters was also debated.
XM53
A nose turret with one 7.62×51mm XM196 machine gun. Also said to be suitable for the UH-1 series of helicopters. Designed to be interchangeable with the XM51.

=== AH-64 Apache ===
M139 and Area Weapon Subsystem

The only type classified subsystem for the Boeing AH-64 Apache series, the M139 is composed of the "Aerial Rocket Control System" which gives the aircraft the ability to fire members of the Hydra 70/Mk 66 2.75 in/70 mm rocket family, a dispenser interface controlling the M130 chaff/flare dispenser (also used on the AH-1 helicopter), and the Area Weapon Subsystem.

The Area Weapon Subsystem is made up of a single M230 30 mm chain gun, turret and assembly, ammunition feed, and other electronic components for the functioning of the system. The unit is capable of 100 degrees of motion in azimuth left or right, 11 degrees of elevation and 60 degrees of depression, and feeds from an ammunition magazine with 1,200 rounds.

=== RAH-66 Comanche ===
Turreted Gun System (TGS)

The Boeing–Sikorsky RAH-66 Comanche was intended to have a gun system designed jointly by Boeing and Sikorsky. The system was to use the XM301 lightweight gun, and fed linked ammunition from a 500-round storage drum. The turret itself had 120 degrees of movement in azimuth, with 15 degrees of elevation and 45 degrees of depression. The TGS was supposed to be ready for deployment with the Comanche helicopter during the FY04 period, but the cancellation of the Comanche project in 2004 ended further development of this system.
