= M197 electric cannon =

20 mm Gatling-type rotary cannon

M197 Gatling gun
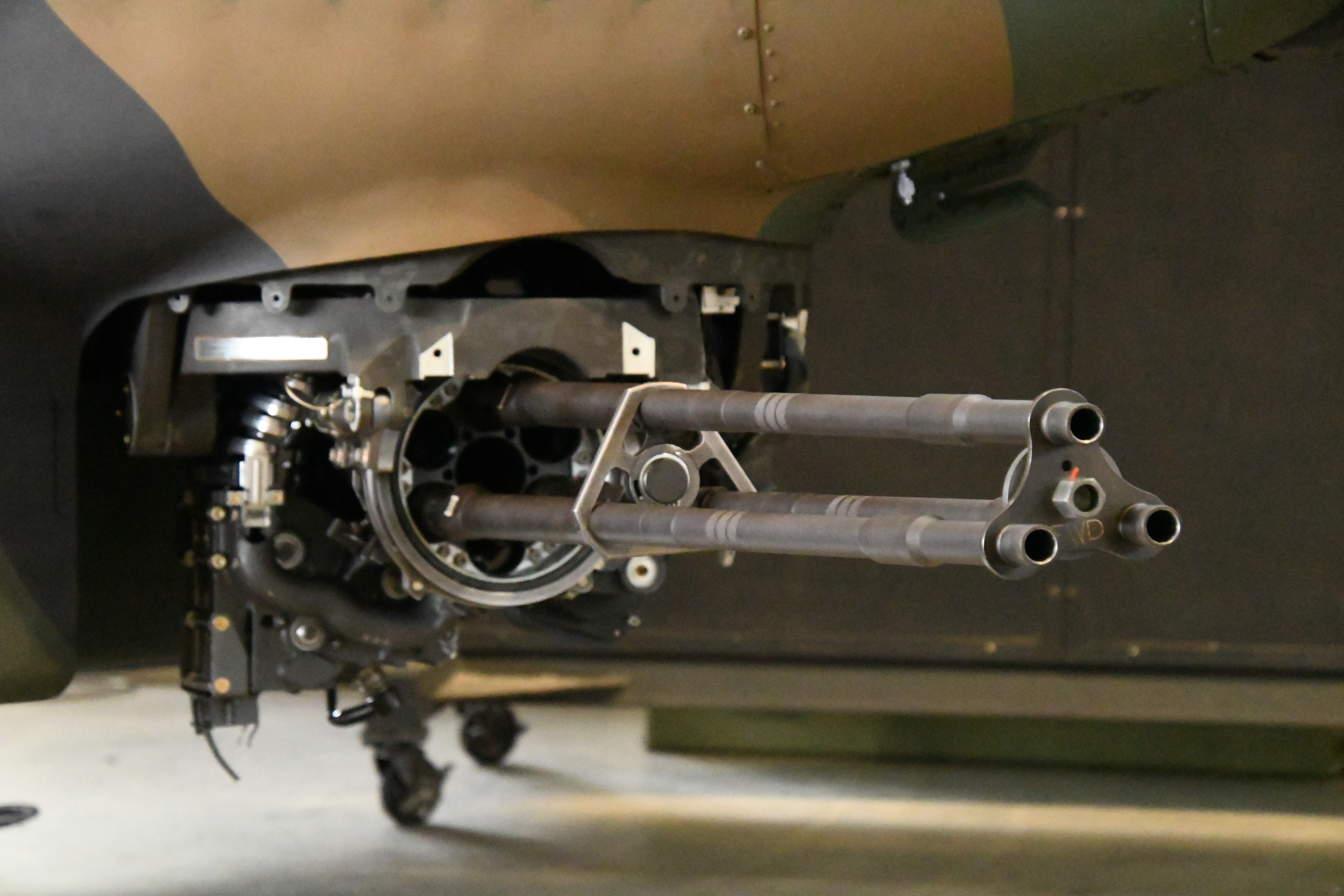
- Type: Rotary cannon
- Place of origin: United States

Service history
- In service: 1967–present
- Used by: United States Marine Corps

Production history
- Designer: General Dynamics
- Manufacturer: General Dynamics Armament Systems

Specifications
- Mass: 132 pounds (60 kg)
- Length: 1,828 millimetres (72.0 in)
- Barrel length: 1,524 millimetres (60.0 in)
- Cartridge: 20×102mm
- Caliber: 20 mm
- Barrels: 3-barrel (progressive RH parabolic twist, 9 grooves)
- Rate of fire: 750-1500 rpm
- Muzzle velocity: 1,030 metres per second (3,400 ft/s)

The M197 electric cannon is a 20 mm three-barreled electric Gatling-type rotary cannon used by the United States military.

== Development ==
The M197 electric cannon was developed primarily for use by United States Army helicopter gunships. Development began in 1967 after experience in the Vietnam War revealed the inadequacy of the 7.62 mm Minigun for gunship use. The M197 is essentially a lightened version of the General Electric M61 Vulcan cannon, with three barrels instead of six. Its maximum rate of fire is one quarter that of the Vulcan, largely to limit its recoil for light aircraft and helicopter use. It shares the Vulcan's M50 and PGU series 20 mm ammunition.

== History ==
The M197 went into service on later marks of the AH-1 Cobra, using either the M97 or A/A49E-7 armament subsystems, and was also fitted in a ventral turret on the U.S. Marine Corps YOV-10D Bronco NOGS. It is also the basis of the GPU-2/A gun pod, which incorporates the cannon, a battery and electric drive motor, and 300 rounds of linkless ammunition.

In the Cobra, the weapon is supplied with a magazine of 700 linked rounds, with a total capacity including feeder system of 750 rounds. It has a cyclic rate of fire of 730+-50 rounds per minute. Standard practice is to fire the cannon in 30- to 50-round bursts. With extended automatic firing from a hover, the recoil is sufficient that the application of forward cyclic to maintain one's position over the ground is inadequate.

The M197 remains in use in the latest AH-1W SuperCobra and AH-1Z Viper gunships. Although the weapon's rotary drive is theoretically quite reliable, its ammunition feed is unreliable: Marine pilots initially reported an alarmingly high jam rate (sometimes greater than 30%). The USMC and the manufacturer are aware of the problem and in 2011 a linkless feed system developed by Meggit Defense Systems was incorporated into the AH-1W and -1Z. The system is capable of holding 650 +/-3 rounds in the storage unit with approximately 40 rounds in the feed chute.

The M197 is also mounted as a chin turret in Italy's Agusta A129 Mangusta CBT helicopter, with a capacity of 500 rounds.

The M197 is also mounted as a chin turret in South Korea's KAI LAH helicopter.

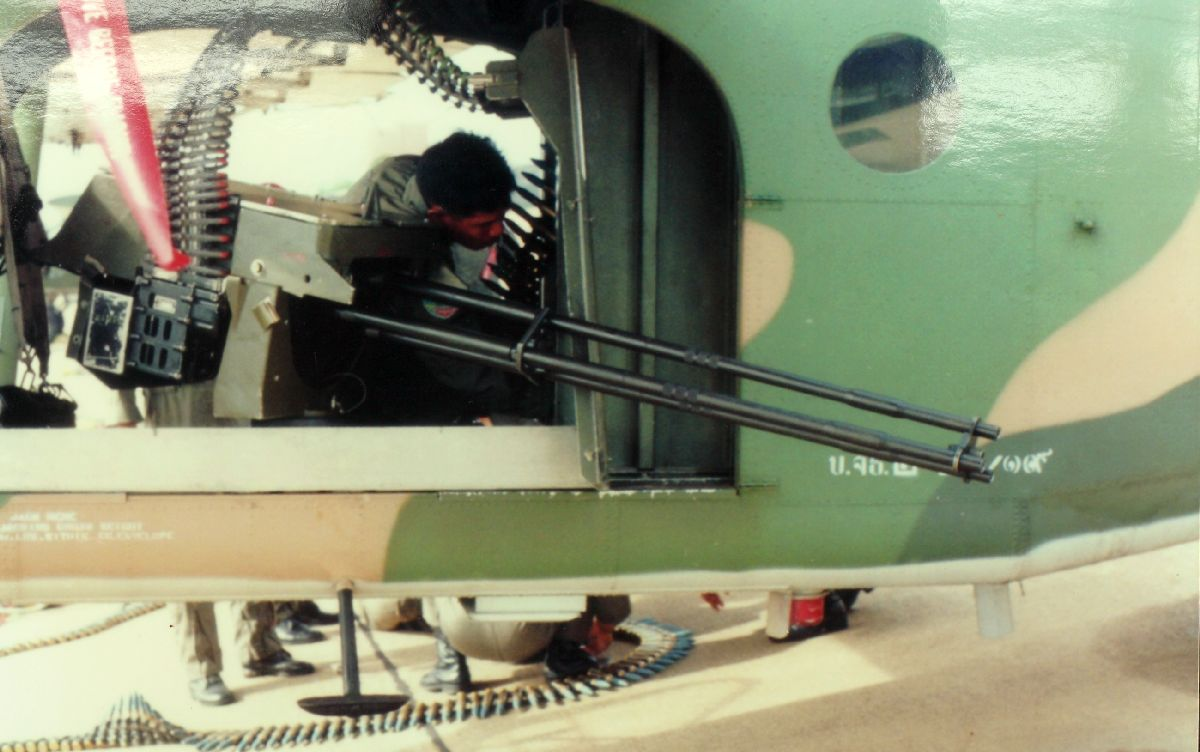
XM197 cannon on an AU-23A

The M197 was also mounted into the AU-23A as a handheld door gun.

The XM301 was an improved M197 intended to be the gun on the later canceled RAH-66 Comanche.

The weapon's current contractor is General Dynamics Armament Systems.

Iran has claimed downing one Iraqi MiG-21 fighter on 14 February 1986 during the Iran–Iraq War using the M197 gun turret installed on its AH-1J Internationals. The cannon was also used during the "dogfights" between Iranian AH-1Js and Iraqi helicopters (usually Mi-24s and Gazelles).

== Ammunition ==
Designation	Type	Projectile Weight [g]	Bursting charge [g]	Muzzle Velocity [m/s]	Description
M53	API	?	4.2 g incendiary	1030	Penetration 20mm at 25-degree impact and 100 meter range, 6.3mm RHA at 0-degree impact and 1000-m range.
M56	HEI	102	9 g HE (RDX/wax/Al) and 1.5 g incendiary	1030	Nose fuzed round, no tracer. Effective radius for causing casualties to exposed personnel is 2 meters with fragmentation hazard out to 20 meters. Penetration 12.5mm RHA at 0 degree obliquity at 100m range
M242	HEI-T	?	?	?	Similar to M56 series of HEI rounds, but with a tracer element
M246	HEI-T	102	8.0 g HE<	?	Nose fuzed tracer round fired by M168 AA gun, self-destruct after 3 to 7 seconds of flight due to tracer burn-through.
M940	MPT-SD	105	9 g A-4/RDX/wax	1050	Multi-purpose fuzeless round, HE charge is initiated by the incendiary charge on the nose on impact. Self-destruct due to tracer burn-through. Penetration 12.5mm RHA at 0 degree impact at 518 m range, or 6.3mm at 60 degrees and 940 m.

== See also ==
- M61 Vulcan
- XM301
- M621 cannon—20×102mm gun mounted in helicopters as a chin turret
