= Point target =

Military term for relatively small targets

A point target is:

1. A target of such small dimension that it requires the accurate placement of ordnance in order to neutralize or destroy it.
2. A nuclear target in which the ratio of radius of damage to target radius is equal to or greater than 5.
3. A radar target that is small compared with the pulse volume, which is the cross-sectional area of the radar beam multiplied by half the length of the radar pulse.

Targets such as city buildings, and targets in the midst of many non-targets are considered to be point targets. When attacking point targets, weapons with only the necessary amount of spread and power are employed.

Point targets are often located near other buildings which contain civilians and other innocents, therefore guided munitions are used to take out only the intended target. A strike executing in this manner is often referred to as a surgical strike.
