= List of U.S. aircraft gun pods =

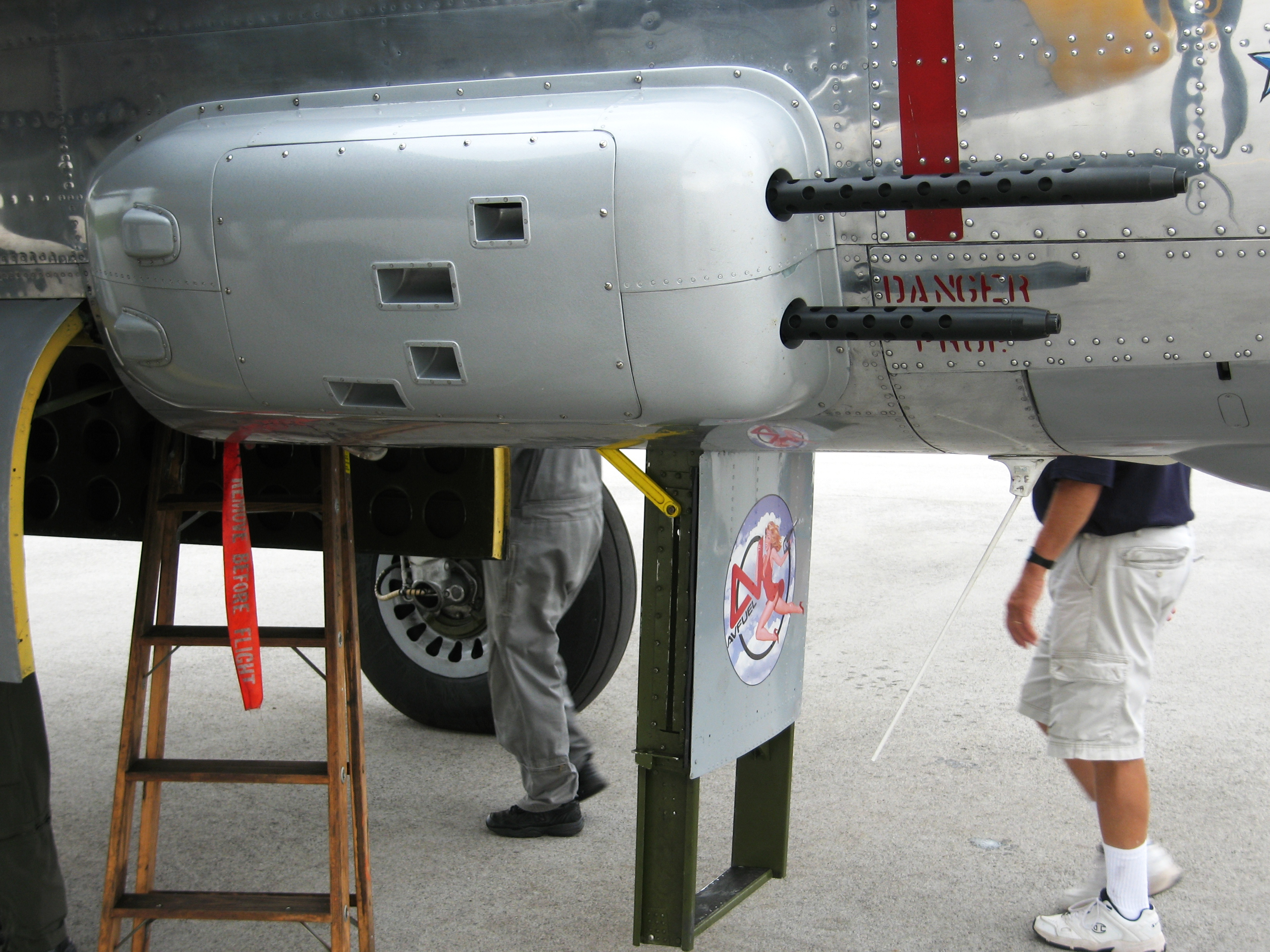
One of the first American attempts at a gun pod was the forward-firing .50-calibre machine gun "blister" mount on the B-25 Mitchell.

The concept of the gun pod came into its prime during and after World War II. "Package gun" installations on US medium and light bombers, such as the B-25 Mitchell and A-26 Invader, were likely the first pods used by the United States military. One of its primary tasks was to suppress ground defenses during attack runs while conducting maritime interdiction, and the extra armament provided additional firepower.

With the rise of missile usage in the post-WWII period many United States aircraft were produced without internal guns, but it was soon found that guns were still needed both for air-to-air combat and close air support. Gun pods offered a simple means of giving aircraft this capability, with no weight penalty on missions where guns were not required.

The United States has developed systems for use both on fixed-wing aircraft and helicopters.

== Descriptions of models ==
=== XM12/M12 and SUU-16/A ===
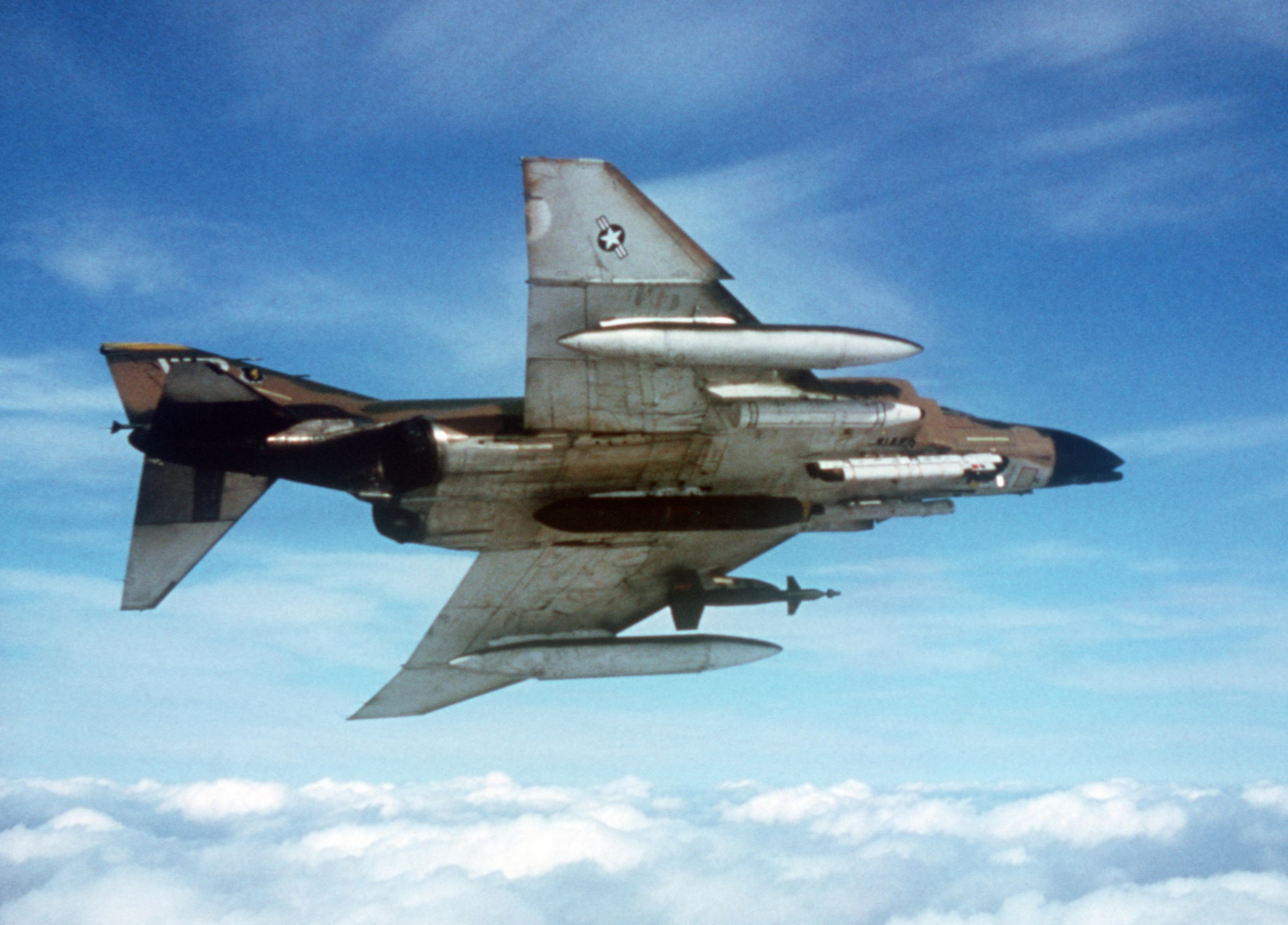
An USAF F-4D Phantom II carrying an SUU-16/A.

Developed as a pod for high-speed fighter aircraft which lacked a gun, this pod was fitted with a single M61A1 20 mm cannon and 1,200 rounds of ammunition. This weapon is powered by a ram-air turbine, and fires at a fixed rate of 6,000 rpm. However, for this firing rate to be achieved the aircraft needs to fly over 300 mph (480 km/h), and the pod is designed to be optimal at speeds above 400 mph (640 km/h). Its weight, 1,650 lb (750 kg) loaded, also precludes it from many light aircraft.

The pod was designated XM12 (possibly standardized as M12) by the US Army and SUU-16/A by the US Air Force. It was sometimes mounted on F-4 Phantom aircraft as a stopgap until internal-gun models entered service.

=== XM13 ===
A pod developed, likely for helicopters, fitted with a single M75 40 mm grenade launcher. Some sources also mention this as a system tested on the JOV-1A Mohawk.

=== XM14 and SUU-12/A ===
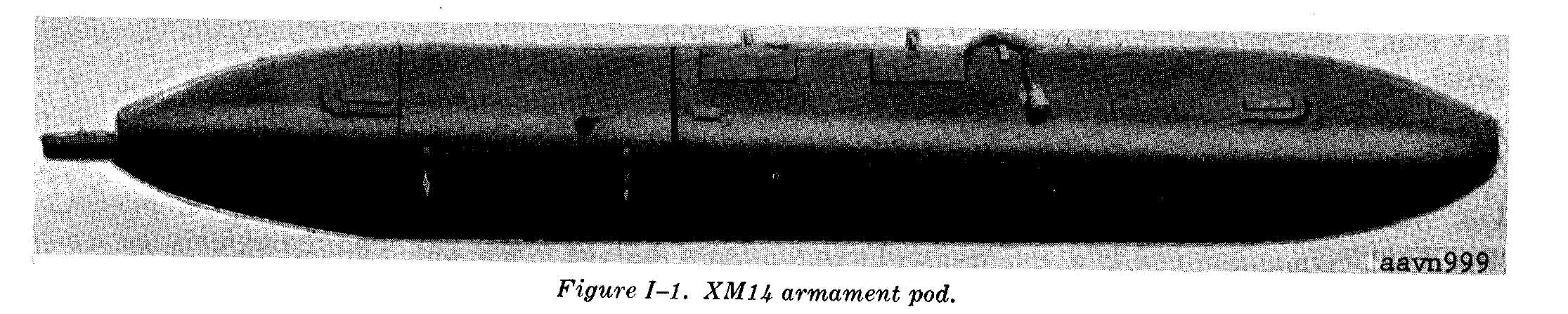
XM14 Gun Pod

A pod developed for both fixed-wing aircraft and helicopters, fitted with a single M3 .50 caliber machine gun. The pod carried 750 rounds of ammunition and provided a pneumatic charging system for the weapon. This system was used on the JOV-1A and UH-1 series of helicopters.

The pod was designated XM14 by the US army and the same pod was designated SUU-12/A by the US Air Force.

=== M18 and SUU-11/A Series ===
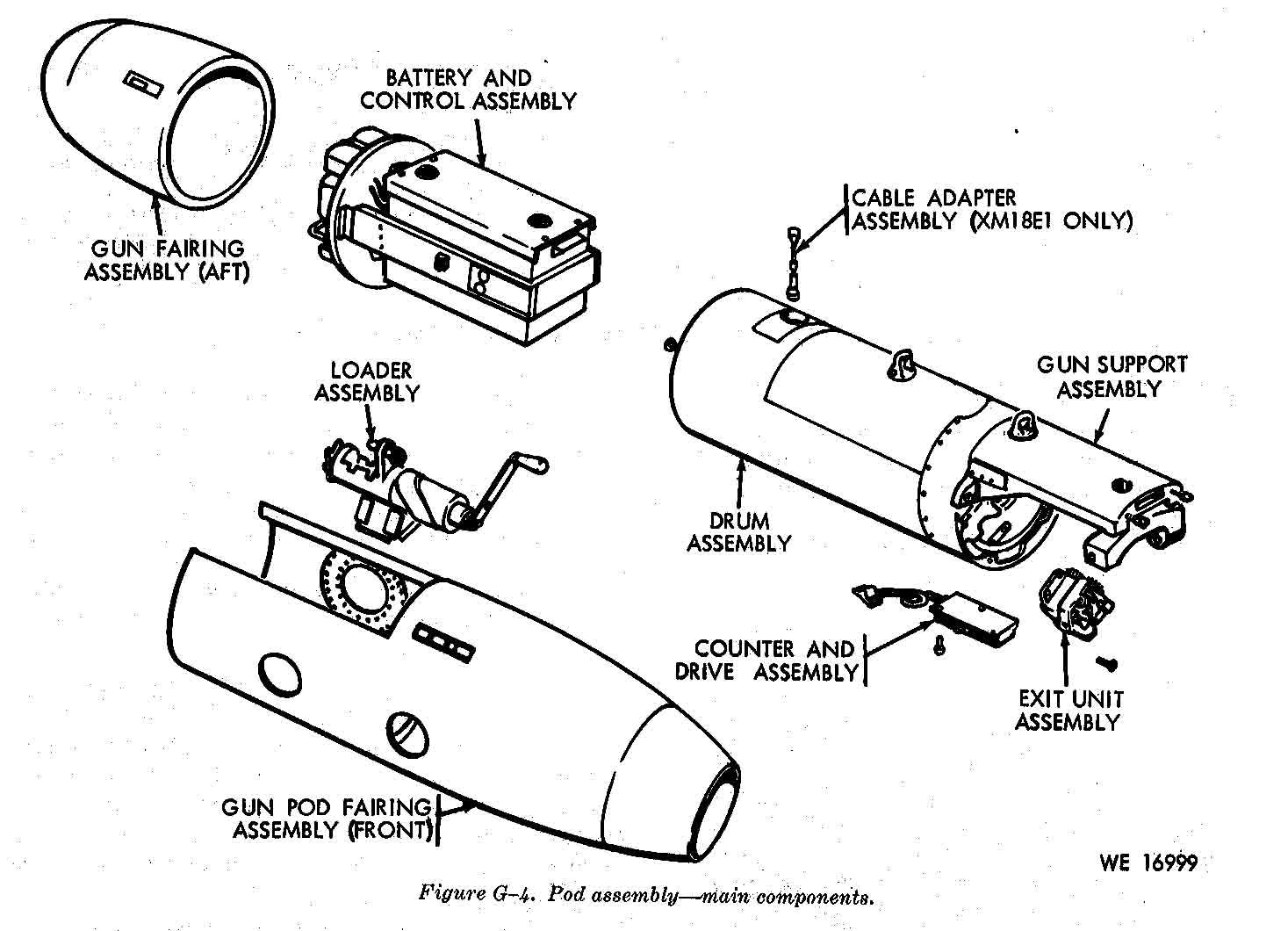
Main components of the XM18 Gun Pod (less M134 machine gun)

Perhaps the most widely used gun pod developed by the US military, fitted with a single GAU-2 7.62×51mm Minigun. This weapon was produced in three generations, with separate designations applied by both the US Army and US Air Force.

The first was the XM18 and SUU-11/A, which featured a standard version of the weapon encased in an aerodynamic pod. This weapon was unmodified and fired at a rate of 6,000 rpm. The fact that the weapon only fed from a drum containing 1,500 rounds of ammunition meant that a slower rate of fire was desired.

The second set of subvariants, designated XM18E1 (and standardized as the M18) and SUU-11A/A, featured an aircraft-to-pod electric connection, allowing aircraft internal power to be used in providing better starting torque, a de-energized solenoid allowing for better round clearing at low rates of fire, and circuitry that allowed for selectable rates of fire. The options were either 2,000 rpm or 4,000 rpm, both significantly lower than the base rate of fire.

The last set of subvariants were designated M18A1 (development of the M18E1) and SUU-11B/A. These featured a slightly higher set of selectable rates of fire, either 3,000 rpm or the high 6,000 rpm.

These pods were used on a wide array of US aircraft, primarily during the Vietnam War, including the A-1 Skyraider, A-37 Dragonfly, AC-47 Spooky, AC-119G Shadow, the T-28 Trojan and the US Navy's OP-2E and AP-2H. It was also tested on the ACH-47A "Guns A-Go-Go" by the US Army and on the UH-1E Iroquois by the US Marine Corps, and were part of standard armament fits for the AH-1 Cobra with both services.

=== XM19 ===
A pod developed by the US Army, likely primarily for helicopters, fitted with two M60C 7.62×51mm machine guns. Does not appear to have been standardized, likely in favor of the M18 series.

This system was also tested with the S-2E Tracker by the US Naval Air Test Center, US Naval Air Station, Patuxent River, Maryland. There is no information as to the outcome of these tests, carried out in 1966, which apparently also involved the SUU-11A/A pod mentioned earlier.

=== XM25 and SUU-23/A ===
Similar to the XM12/SUU-16/A, this pod featured a self-powered variant of the M61A1, designated XM130 (may have been standardized as the M130) by the US Army and GAU-4/A by the US Air Force. This modification allowed its carriage on aircraft that could not meet the speed requirement of the previous unit, and reduced drag by removing the ram-air turbine requirement. This pod was popular for use on the F-4C and F-4D Phantom II aircraft, as well as British FG.1 and FGR.2 Phantom IIs. The pod still has a weight restriction, weighing more than its predecessor at 1,730 lb (780 kg) loaded with 1,200 rounds of ammunition, and still has the fixed rate of 6,000 rpm.

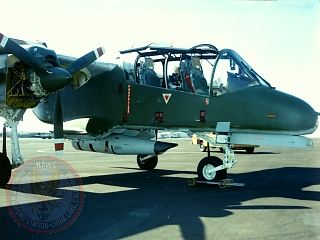
GPU-2/A Gun Pod mounted on a US Navy OV-10A Bronco at China Lake NAWS

The pod was designated XM25 (possibly standardized as M25) by the US Army and the same pod was designated SUU-23/A by the US Air Force.

=== GPU-2/A ===
A lightweight gun pod fitted with the M197 20 mm cannon, the unit weighs only 586 lb (266 kg) loaded with 300 rounds of ammunition. It has selectable fire rates of either 700 rpm or 1,500 rpm. The pod is self-contained and powered by a rechargeable nickel-cadmium battery with sufficient charge to expend three complete loads before replacement is needed. This weapon has been tested on the A-37 Dragonfly and OV-10 Bronco.

=== GPU-5/A ===
Developed under Project Pave Claw, the GPU-5/A was designed to adapt the power of the A-10 Thunderbolt II and its GAU-8/A gun to smaller aircraft. The resulting weapon used a smaller version of the GAU-8/A, designated the GAU-13/A, with only four barrels. Podded, the system weights 1,900 lb (860 kg) loaded with 353 rounds of 30 mm ammunition in two helical layers surrounding the gun (for reduction of overall size). The pod is completely self-contained with a rate of fire of 3,000 rpm.

=== Mk 4 Mod 0 ===
Mark 4 Gunpod Operating Principles (1965) De-classified US Navy promotional film reel.

Developed by the US Navy, this pod is fitted with the Mk 11 Mod 5 20 mm cannon, along with 750 rounds of ammunition. This pod is said to have been used on a variety of US Navy and Marine Corps aircraft including the A-4 Skyhawk, F-4 Phantom II, A-7 Corsair II, and OV-10 Bronco. Approximately 1200 Mk 4 Gun Pods were manufactured by Hughes Tool Company (later Hughes Helicopters) in Culver City, California. While the system was tested and certified for use on the A-4, the A-6, the A-7, the F-4, and the OV-10, it only saw extended use on the A-4, the F-4, and the OV-10. In the case of the OV-10, the unit was used by VAL-4, a Navy squadron assigned to Bình Thủy District, Vietnam, and was used extensively for close air support missions.
