= Kortik CIWS =

Hybrid SAM-gun based CIWS

Kortik / Kashtan
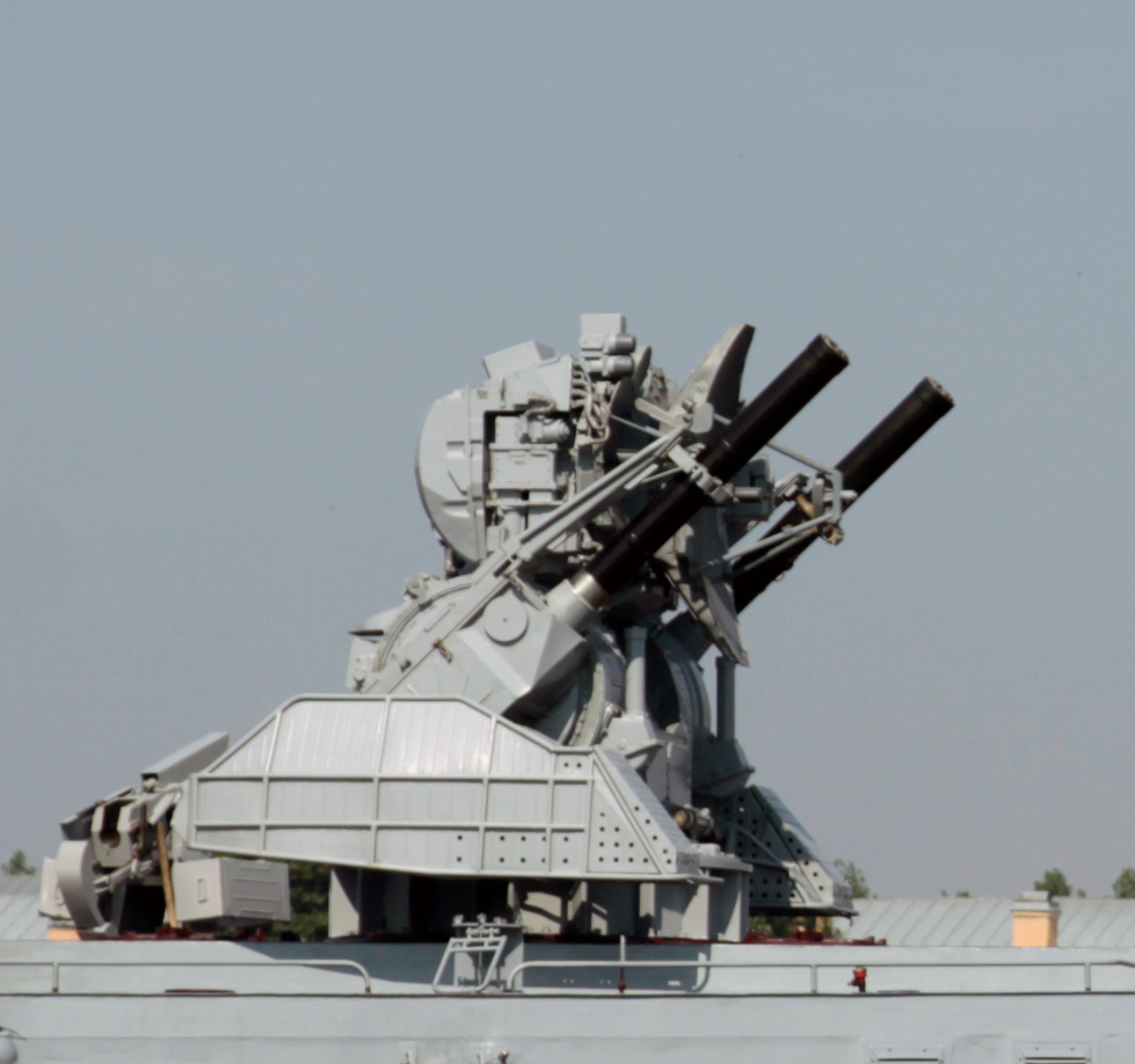
- A Kortik combat module (missiles absent)
- Type: Hybrid SAM-Gun based CIWS
- Place of origin: Soviet Union, Russia

Service history
- In service: 1989–present
- Used by: See Operators

Production history
- Designer: Developer: KBP (Arkady Shipunov); Fire control system: RATEP
- Designed: Late 1970s–?
- Manufacturer: Tulamashzavod, RATEP
- Produced: 1989–present
- Variants: Kortik-M / Kashtan-M

Specifications
- Mass: 15,500 kg (34,200 lb) (Kashtan); 12,500 kg (27,600 lb) (Kashtan-M)
- Height: 2,250 mm (89 in) (above deck)
- Shell: HEI-Frag, Frag-T, APDS-T
- Shell weight: 0.39 kg (0.86 lb) (HEIF, FT); 0.30 kg (0.66 lb) (APDS-T)
- Caliber: 30×165mm AO-18 (Note: Not compatible with the army 30×165mm ammunition.)
- Barrels: 2 × 6 (guns); 2 × 4 launch tubes
- Action: Gas-operated rotary cannon
- Rate of fire: Kashtan: (Note: 6–8 sec reaction time. Kashtan-M: 5–7 sec (3–6 sec according to other sources).); 9,000 rounds/min (guns); Kashtan-M: 1–2 (salvo) missiles per 3–4 sec 10,000 rounds/min (guns)
- Muzzle velocity: 860 m/s (2,800 ft/s) (HEIF, FT); Kashtan-M: 960 m/s (3,100 ft/s) (HEIF, FT); 1,100 m/s (3,600 ft/s) (APDS-T)
- Effective firing range: By missiles: Kashtan: 1,500–8,000 m (4,900–26,200 ft); Kashtan-M: 1,500–10,000 m (4,900–32,800 ft); By guns: Kashtan: (range, altitude); 500–4,000 m (1,600–13,100 ft), 3,000 m (9,800 ft); Kashtan-M: 300–5,000 m (980–16,400 ft)
- Feed system: Link-less, helical; 1000 rounds
- Sights: Radar / TV-optical: (Note: Kashtan-M can be equipped with radar and optics, only radar or only optics.); 2–3/1 m (6.6–9.8/3.3 ft) accuracy, tracks 6 targets simultaneously
- Warhead: Continuous-rod w/ frag layer
- Main armament: 8 × 9M311K + 32 missiles (Note: 1.5 minutes reload time.) (Note: Kashtan is compatible with the Kashtan-M's 9M311-1E missiles.); Kashtan-M: 8 × 9M311-1E + 24 missiles
- Secondary armament: 2 × AO-18K autocannon Kashtan-M: 2 × AO-18KD autocannon
- Flight altitude: 3,500 m (11,500 ft) (Kashtan); 6,000 m (20,000 ft) (Kashtan-M)
- Maximum speed: 910 m/s (3,000 ft/s)

The Kortik (Russian: Кортик, "dirk") close-in weapon system (CIWS) is a naval air defence gun-missile system deployed by the Russian Navy. Its export version is known as Kashtan (Russian: Каштан, English: Chestnut), with the NATO designation CADS-N-1.

The Kortik is found on the Russian aircraft carrier Admiral Kuznetsov, the Kirov-class battlecruiser, the Neustrashimy-class frigate, as well as the People's Liberation Army Navy Sovremenny-class destroyers, and other designs. Typically deployed as a combined gun and missile system, it provides defence against anti-ship missiles, anti-radar missiles and guided bombs. The system can also be employed against fixed- or rotary-wing aircraft or even surface vessels such as fast attack boats or targets on shore.

The Kortik will be replaced in Russian Navy service by the Pantsir-M CIWS, which uses similar rotary cannons but different missile and radar systems.

== Design ==
The weapon is a modular system consisting of a command module and typically two combat modules, as in the case of the two Sovremennyy-class destroyers Taizhou (ex-Vnushitelnyy) and Ningbo (ex-Vechnyy) in Chinese service, although the number can be as many as 8 in the case of Admiral Kuznetsov. The command module detects and tracks threats, distributes targeting data to the combat modules, and interrogates the IFF system of approaching threats. The command module has a 3-D target detection radar, and an all weather multi-band integrated control system. Depending on the number of installed combat modules, the system can engage multiple targets simultaneously. The combat modules automatically track using either radar, an electro-optronic control system (such as FLIRs) or both, and then engages targets with missiles and guns. The combat modules are typically equipped with two GSh-30K (AO-18K) six-barrel 30 mm rotary cannons, with a link-less feeding mechanism, and two 9M311-1 missile launchers equipped with 4 ready-to-fire missiles each and fed by a reloading system storing 32 missiles in ready-to-launch containers.

The guns used in the Kortik are the GSh-30K six-barrel 30 mm rotary cannon. Individually, each GSh-30K has a higher rate of fire compared to guns used by other CIWS such as the GAU-8 on the Goalkeeper and the M61 Vulcan on the Phalanx. Along with a high rate of fire, the fairly heavy round (390 g or 14 oz) used by the Kortik is comparable to the DPU rounds of the GAU-8 Avenger (425 g or 15.0 oz), although the muzzle velocity (and therefore both the kinetic energy and effective range) is slightly lower, partially offsetting the high caliber and rate of fire.

The missiles used in the Kortik are the 9M311, which are also used on the 2K22 Tunguska. The 9M311 is an ACLOS guided missile. The warhead weighs 9 kilograms (20 lb) and is either laser or radio fused. The warhead is a continuous-rod warhead with a steel cube fragmentation layer. The detonation of the warhead will form a complete circle of fragmentation that is 5 meters in radius, and damage or destroy anything in that circle.

The combination of the missiles and guns provides more comprehensive protection when compared to other CIWS utilising either missiles or guns only. The system's combined kill probability is allegedly 0.96 to 0.99.

== Variants ==
- Kashtan-M: improved variant with:
  - Salvo capability
  - Dedicated targeting station
  - Two AO-18KD cannons with higher muzzle velocity (range improved from 4 to 5 km)
  - Improved missile range and engagement altitude (from 8 to 10 km for range and from 3.5 to 6 km altitude)
  - Decreased system's reaction time from 6.8 to 5.7 seconds
  - Sensor modularity
  - Lower sensitivity
  - Vulnerable to air to ground missiles and more than 900 pound bombs.

== Specifications ==
	Kashtan	Kashtan-M
Weight	15,500 kg (34,200 lb)	12,500 kg (27,560 lb)
Armament	2 x GSh-6-30	2 x GSh-6-30KD
Firing Rate	2 x 4,500 rds/min	2 x 5,000 rds/min
Target Range	500-4,000m (1,640-13,120 ft)	
Effective Range	500-1,500m (1,640-4,920 ft)	
Ammunition Store	2 x 500 rounds	2 x 1500 rounds
Muzzle Velocity	860 m/s (2,820 ft/s)	960–1100 m/s (3,150-3,610 ft/s)
Elevation	3,000 m (9,840 ft)	

== Operators ==
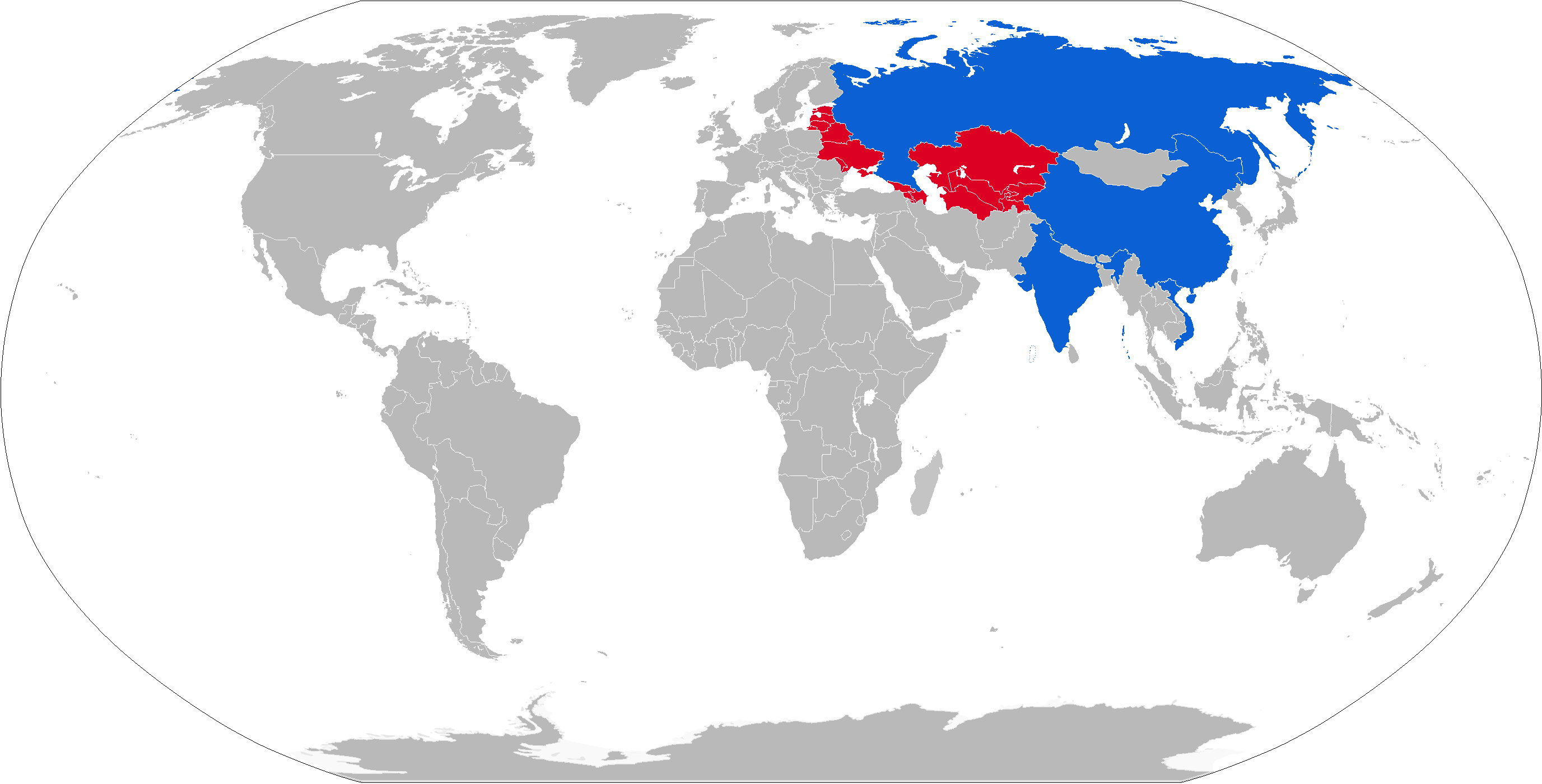
Map of Kashtan operators in blue with former operators in red

=== Current operators ===
- Russia
- Vietnam
  - Tarantula-class corvette
- India
  - Talwar-class frigates

=== Former operators ===
- Soviet Union

== See also ==
- CIWS
- KBP Instrument Design Bureau
- Tunguska-M1
- Pantsir-M/EM
