= Gryazev-Shipunov GSh-6-23 =

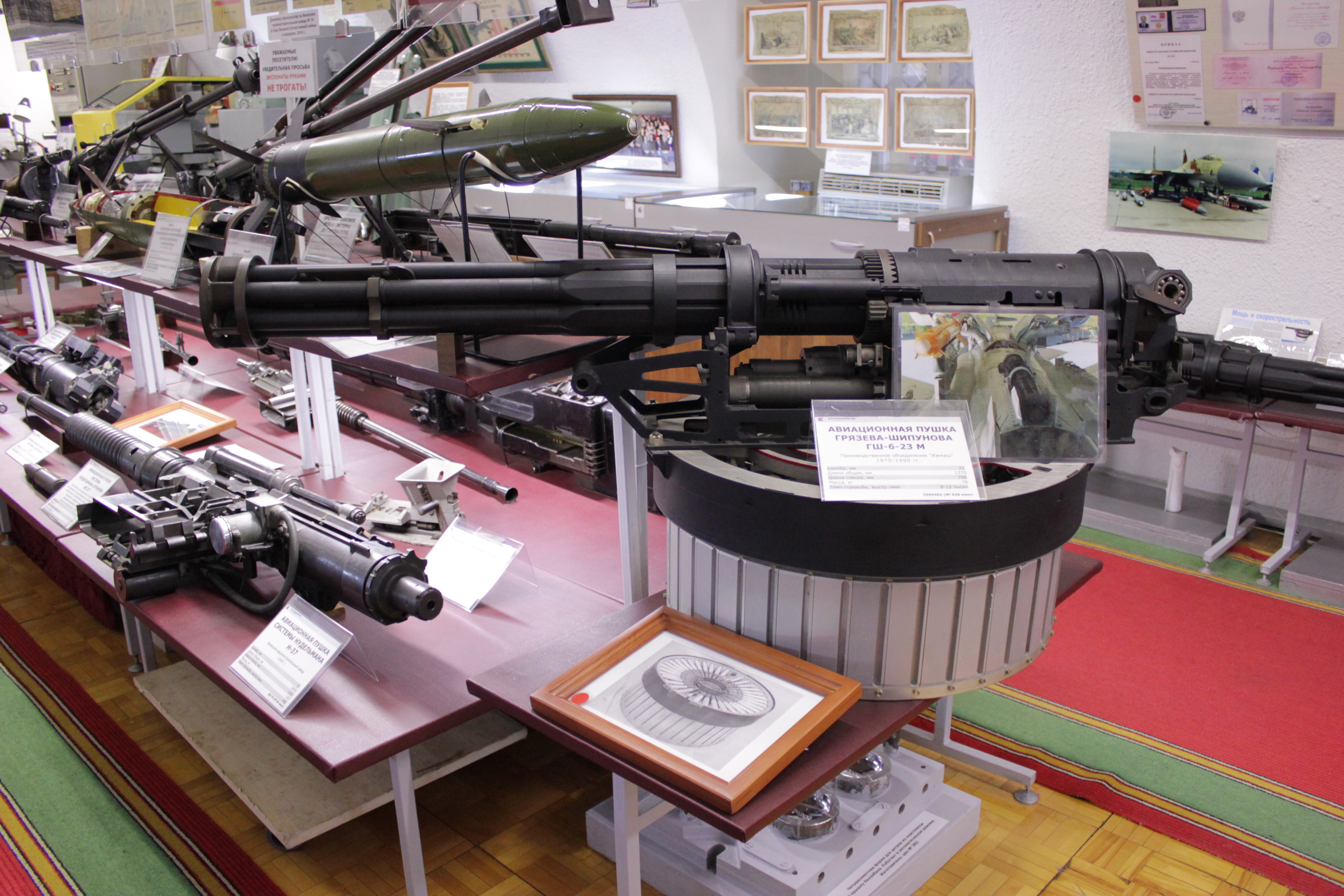
- GSh-6-23M on the installation of 9-EYU-768K, designed to equip the MiG-31 interceptor
- Type: Rotary cannon
- Place of origin: Soviet Union

Service history
- In service: 1975-present

Production history
- Designer: Vassily P. Gryazev and Arkady G. Shipunov
- Manufacturer: KBP Instrument Design Bureau Tula

Specifications
- Mass: 73–76 kg (161–167 lb)
- Length: 1.4 m (4 ft 7 in)
- Barrel length: 1 m (3 ft 34 in)
- Height: 18 cm (7 in)
- Cartridge: 23×115mm AM-23
- Caliber: 23 mm
- Barrels: 6
- Action: Gas-operated
- Rate of fire: 10,000 (standard).
- Muzzle velocity: 715 m/s (2345 ft/s)
- Feed system: Belt or linkless feed system

The Gryazev-Shipunov GSh-6-23 (Russian: Грязев-Шипунов ГШ-6-23) (GRAU designation: 9A-620 for GSh-6-23, 9A-768 for GSh-6-23M modernized variant) is a six-barreled 23 mm rotary cannon used by some modern Soviet/Russian military aircraft.

The GSh-6-23 differs from most American multi-barreled aircraft cannon in that it is gas-operated, rather than externally powered via an electric, hydraulic, or pneumatic system.

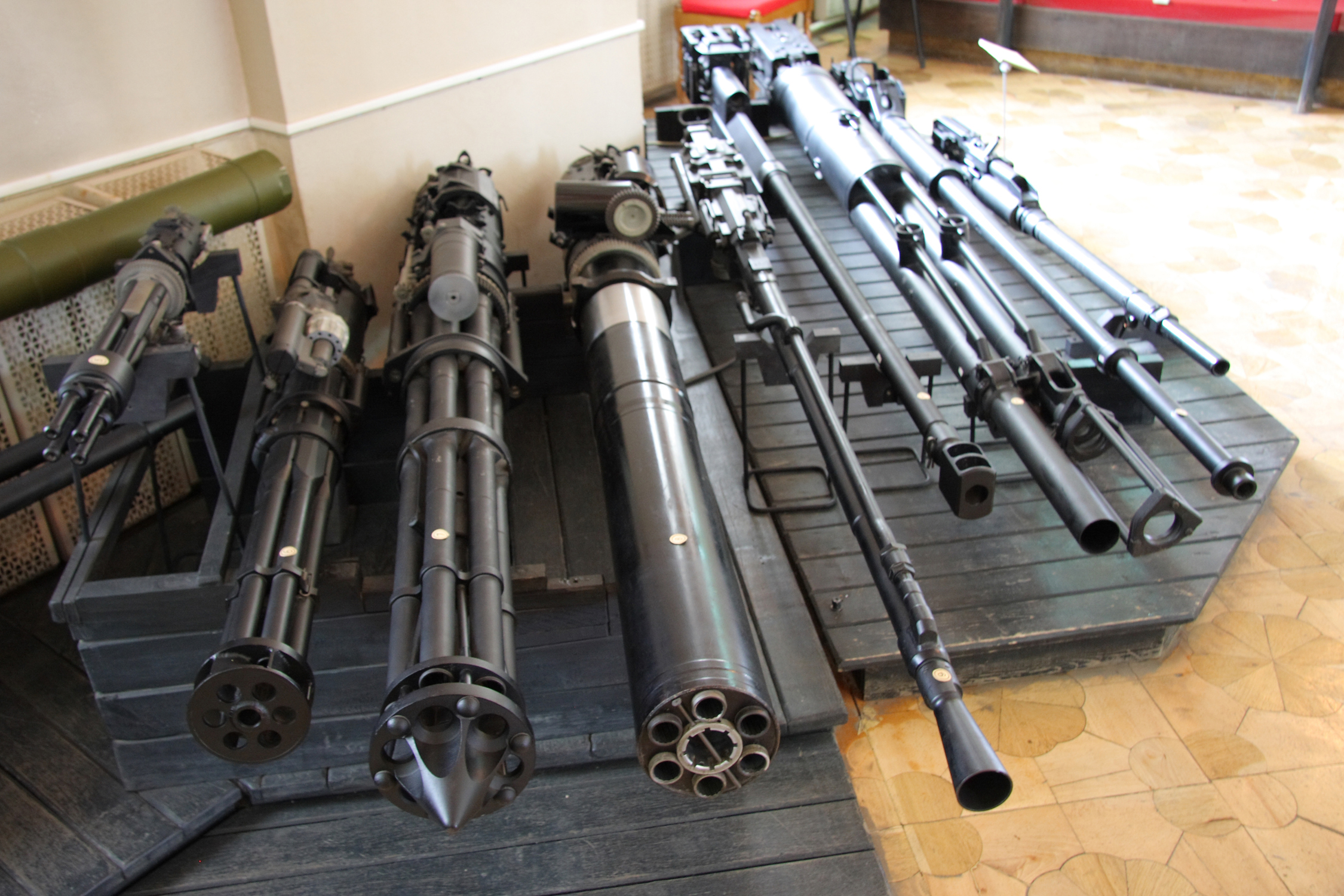
Second from the left GSh-6-23

The GSh-6-23 uses the 23×115 Russian AM-23 round, fed via linked cartridge belt or a linkless feed system. The linkless system, adopted after numerous problems and failures with the belt feed, is limited. Fire control is electrical, using a 27 V DC system. The cannon has 10 pyrotechnic cocking charges, similar to those used in European gas-operated revolver cannon such as the DEFA 554 or Mauser BK-27.

The rapid rate of fire exhausts ammunition quickly: the Mikoyan MiG-31 aircraft, for example, with 260 rounds of ammunition (800 rounds maximum), would empty its ammunition tank in less than two seconds.

GSh-6-23M has the highest rate of fire out of any autocannon so far.

The GSh-6-23 is used by the Sukhoi Su-24 attack aircraft, the MiG-31 interceptor aircraft, and the now-obsolete Sukhoi Su-15 among others. However, after two Su-24s were lost because of premature shell detonation in 1983, and because of some other problems with gun usage (such as system failures), usage of the GSh-6-23 was stopped by a decision of the Soviet Air Force Command. At present all aircraft in the Russian Aerospace Forces are flying with fully operational guns.

It is also used in the SPPU-6 gun pod, which can traverse to −45° elevation, and ±45° azimuth.

== Variants ==
- Gryazev-Shipunov GSh-6-23M; a modernized version.

== See also ==
- GAU-8 Avenger
- Glagolev-Shipunov-Gryazev GShG-7.62
- Gryazev-Shipunov GSh-23
- Gryazev-Shipunov GSh-6-30
- M61 Vulcan
- M134 Minigun
- List of Russian weaponry

== Sources ==
- Rapid Fire, Anthony G. Williams, Airlife UK, August 2000
- Koll, Christian (2009). Soviet Cannon - A Comprehensive Study of Soviet Arms and Ammunition in Calibres 12.7mm to 57mm. Austria: Koll. p. 162. ISBN 978-3-200-01445-9.
