= GAU-13 =

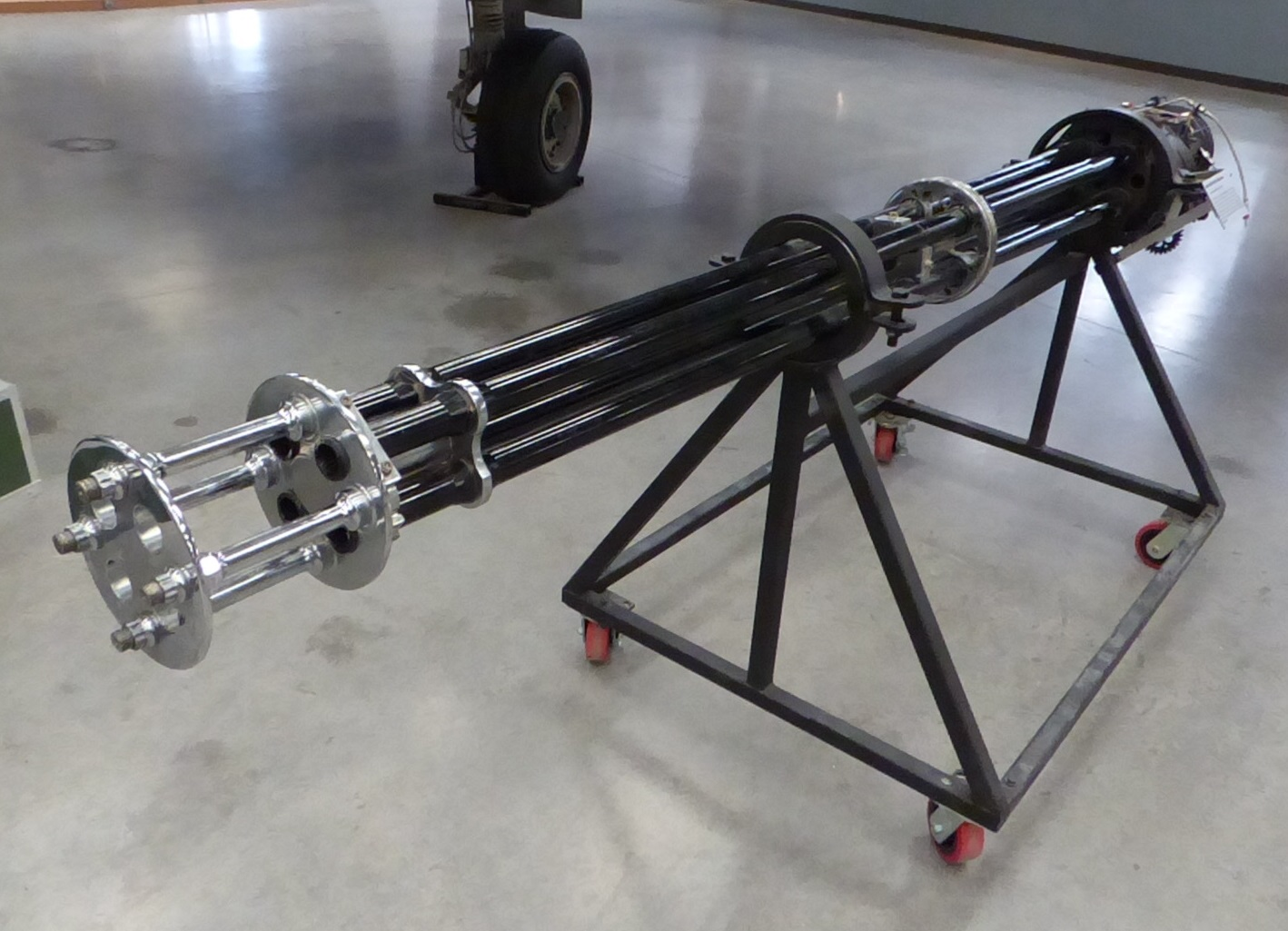
- GAU-13/A 30 mm gatling cannon, Pima Air Museum, Tucson AZ
- Type: Gatling-style autocannon
- Place of origin: United States

Service history
- In service: 1970s–present
- Used by: United States

Production history
- Designer: General Electric
- Manufacturer: General Dynamics

Specifications
- Mass: 333 lb (151 kg)
- Length: 9 ft 2 in (2.79 m)
- Cartridge: 30 × 173 mm
- Caliber: 30 mm caliber
- Barrels: 4-barrel (progressive RH parabolic twist, 14 grooves)
- Action: Pneumatic-driven
- Rate of fire: 2,400 rpm (rounds per minute)
- Muzzle velocity: 3,600 ft/s (1,100 m/s)
- Feed system: Linkless feed system

The General Electric GAU-13/A is a 30 mm electric Gatling-type rotary cannon derived from the GAU-8 Avenger cannon.

== Description ==
The GAU-13 was developed in the late 1970s for use in gun pod applications for fighter aircraft and attack aircraft use, primarily for air-to-ground and anti-tank attacks.

The GAU-13/A is a four-barreled rotary cannon based on the mechanism of the larger GAU-8, sharing the same massive 30 mm ammunition. Like the Avenger, it has a double-ended feed system with reverse clearing to remove unfired rounds. Unlike the GAU-8, however, it is pneumatically driven, giving it a rate of fire of 2,400 rounds per minute. Minimum time between stoppages is estimated at 32,000 rounds, making it a very reliable weapon.

The GAU-13/A uses the same range of PGU-13 High Explosive Incendiary (HEI) and PGU-14 Armor-Piercing Incendiary (API) rounds (which contain a depleted uranium penetrator) as the Avenger. Despite its somewhat lower rate of fire compared to the seven-barreled Avenger, it is an immensely powerful weapon.

The principal application for the GAU-13/A was the GPU-5/A gun pod (originally marketed as the GEPOD 30). The pod is 4.3 metres (14 feet 1 inch) long and can be mounted on any standard NATO 762 mm (30.0 in) suspension lugs. It holds 353 rounds of ammunition, enough for approximately nine seconds of continuous fire. The GPU-5/A weight is 600 kg (1,300 lb) empty and 841 kg (1,854 lb) fully loaded. The pod is completely self-contained.

The GPU-5/A was intended for carriage on a wide range of U.S. tactical aircraft, including the F-15 Eagle and F-16 Fighting Falcon. In the mid-1980s the USAF considered a specialized variant of the F-16 for the close air support (CAS) mission, using the GPU-5, as a substitute to or adjunct for the A-10 Thunderbolt II.

The GPU-5 pod, however, proved unsatisfactory in service. It was briefly tried on some Air National Guard F-16 Fighting Falcons during the 1991 Gulf War, but was removed from service after barely a day of combat use because of its very poor accuracy. Despite the cannon's impressive ballistic characteristics, the pylon mounting was not sufficiently rigid to prevent deflection, and the weapon's heavy recoil exacerbated the problem by causing pylon misalignment. Further, the GPU-5 was not integrated into the F-16's sighting system. The GPU-5 is no longer in U.S. service, although some Thai F-5E Tiger II aircraft still carry the weapon; it was also tested on the F-20 Tigershark.

In mid/late 1995, the U.S. Marine Corps conducted a trial of the GPU-5 on the LCAC-66, as a potential weapon to provide suppressive fire for landing forces. The pod was mounted on a standard MAU-12 bomb rack, itself mounted in a standard cargo container. It was believed that four such containers could then be carried on the LCAC. The resulting combination was referenced as the Gun Platform Air Cushion (GPAC). By 1997, the Marines had reportedly acquired the USAF's entire stock of GAU-13/A cannons and GPU-5 pods as surplus. Besides the GPAC, the GAU-13/A was also touted as possible armament on ships and ground vehicles such as the LAV-25.

== General and cited sources ==
- f-16.net
- Friedman, Norman (1997). The Naval Institute Guide to World Naval Weapon Systems. Naval Institute Press. ISBN 978-1-55750-268-1.
- Polmar, Norman (2004). The Naval Institute Guide to the Ships and Aircraft of the U.S. Fleet. Naval Institute Press. ISBN 978-1-59114-685-8.
