= Barrage (artillery) =

Artillery tactic

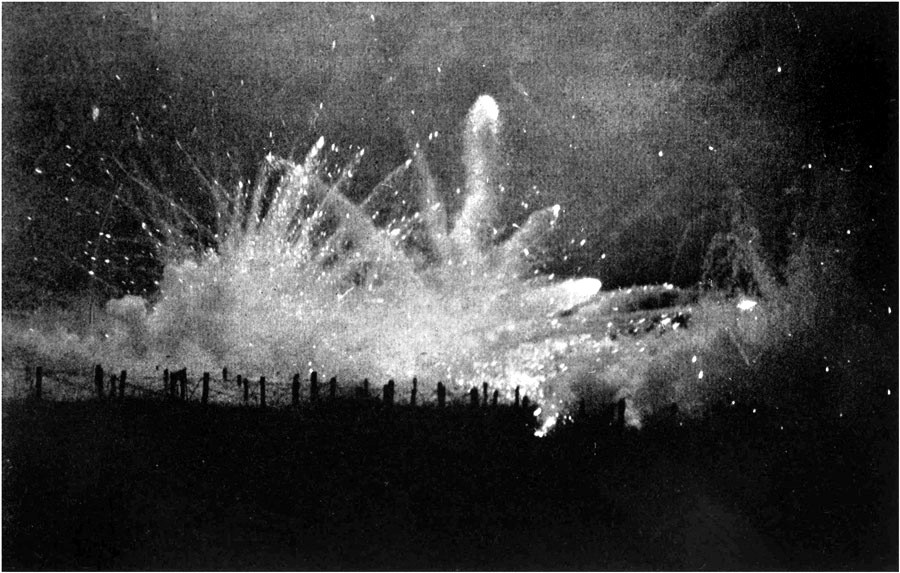
A German artillery barrage falling on Allied trenches at Ypres, probably during the Second Battle of Ypres in 1915, during the First World War.

In military usage, a barrage is massed sustained artillery fire (shelling) aimed at a series of points along a line. In addition to attacking any enemy in the kill zone, a barrage intends to suppress enemy movements and deny access across that line of barrage. The impact points along the line may be 20 to 30 yards (18 to 27 m) apart, with the total line length of the barrage zone anything from a few hundred to several thousand yards long. Barrages can consist of multiple such lines, usually about 100 yards (91 m) apart, with the barrage shifting from one line to the next over time, or several lines may be targeted simultaneously.

A barrage may involve a few or many artillery batteries, or even (rarely) a single gun. Typically each gun in a barrage, using indirect fire, will fire continuously at a steady rate at its assigned point for an assigned time before moving onto the next target, following the barrage's detailed timetable. Barrages typically use high-explosive shells, but may also be shrapnel, smoke, illumination, poison gas (in World War I), or potentially other chemical agents. Barrages are in contrast with concentrated artillery fire, which has a single specific target such as a known enemy position or structure, and in contrast with direct fire which targets enemies within the direct line of sight of the gun.

Barrages may be used defensively or offensively, and have a variety of patterns. Defensive ones are often static (such as a standing barrage) while offensive ones are moved in coordination with the advancing friendly troops (such as creeping, rolling, or block barrages). They may target along the front line, or further into enemy back area to isolate certain enemy positions (such as a box barrage). A series of different patterns may be employed as a battle develops, with each barrage lasting only a few minutes or many hours. Barrages are usually integral with larger operations of multiple military formations, from divisions to armies, requiring days to weeks of preparation and exact planning.

The barrage was developed by the British Army in the Second Boer War. It came to prominence in World War I, notably its use by the British Expeditionary Force and particularly from late 1915 onwards when the British realized that the suppressive effects of artillery to provide covering fire were the key to breaking into defensive positions. By late 1916 the creeping barrage was the standard means of applying artillery fire to support an infantry attack, with the infantry following the advancing barrage as closely as possible. Its employment in this way recognised the importance of artillery fire in suppressing or neutralizing, rather than destroying, the enemy. It was found that a moving barrage immediately followed by the infantry assault could be far more effective than weeks of preliminary bombardment.

Barrages remained in use in World War II and later, but only as one of a variety of artillery tactics made possible by improvements in predicted fire, target location and communications. The term barrage is widely – and technically incorrectly – used in the popular media for any artillery fire.

== Development ==
The moving barrage was developed during the Boer War, one of several tactical innovations instituted under command of General Redvers Buller. It was a response to Boer defensive positions, notably at Tugela Heights and effective long range rifle fire.

Artillery usually fired over open sights at visible targets, until the Second Boer War when indirect fire started to be used. The largest unit accustomed to firing at a single target was the brigade (i.e. an artillery battalion), normally 18 guns. Trench warfare led to the necessity for indirect firing through the use of observers, more sophisticated artillery fire plans and an increasingly scientific approach to gunnery. Gunners had to use increasingly complicated calculations to lay the guns. Individual guns were aimed so that their fall of shot was co-ordinated with others to form a pattern; in the case of a barrage, the pattern was a line. The term “barrage” was first used in World War I in English in the orders for the Battle of Neuve Chapelle in 1915.

=== Lifting barrage ===
A lifting barrage was a development in which the barrage lifted periodically to a target further back, such as a second line of trenches. This was used during the first day of the Somme and it was countered by the defenders infiltrating troops and machine guns into no-man's land or the areas between their own trench lines, so it was found necessary to comb the entire area of the advance with artillery fire.

=== Creeping barrage ===
A creeping barrage (also called a moving barrage) was a barrage that lifted in small increments, usually 50 to 100 yards (46 to 91 m) every few minutes, moving forward slowly, keeping pace with the infantry. British practice evolved to fire at two lines simultaneously. Eventually, three patterns of advancing the barrage developed. In a creeping barrage, the shell-fire moved from one line to the next. In a block barrage two or more lines were fired on simultaneously and then the fire moved as block to the next lines to be engaged. In a rolling barrage, the fire on the line nearest to their own troops moved to the first unengaged line behind then after a set interval the fire on the second line would move in turn to the next one behind that.

By late 1917, the technique of a creeping barrage had been perfected and could be made to move in complex ways, the barrage wheeling or even combing back and forth, to catch the defenders re-emerging after the barrage had passed but it was still governed by a timetable. A creeping barrage that was too slow would risk friendly fire on one's advancing troops; too quickly could mean that the enemy would have too much time to emerge from cover to resume defensive positions and attack the exposed advancing troops. After World War I the British developed the "quick barrage", a standard barrage pattern that could be ordered by radio without advance plotting of the fire plan on a map.

=== Standing and box barrages ===
A standing barrage was static, and might be defensive, to inhibit the movement of enemy troops and break up attacks. A creeping barrage could be made to stand on a line for a time before it moved on, perhaps waiting for the infantry to form up behind it, or to catch up, or perhaps it would stand on the line of known enemy defences, to do more damage and sap enemy morale. The fireplan for the Battle of Messines on 7 June 1917 called for most of the British 18-pounder field guns to fire a creeping barrage of shrapnel immediately ahead of the advance, while the other field guns and 4.5-inch (110 mm) howitzers fired a standing barrage some 700 yards (640 m) ahead.

The standing barrage was aligned with known German positions, and lifted to the next target when the advance reached within 400 yards (370 m) of it. As each objective was taken by the infantry, the creeping barrage would pause at 150 to 300 yards (140 to 270 m) ahead of them and become a standing barrage, protecting the newly gained positions from counter-attack while the infantry consolidated. During this time the pace of fire slackened to one round per gun a minute, enabling the guns and the crews a respite before resuming full intensity as the barrage moved on. The heavy and super-heavy artillery fired on German rear areas. Over 700 machine guns participated in the barrage, using indirect fire over the heads of their own troops.

In a box barrage three or four barrages formed a box – or more often three sides of a box – around a position to isolate it. Standing or box barrages were often used for defensive fire tasks, in which the barrage was registered beforehand on a position – agreed with the defending infantry commander – to be called down in the event of an enemy attack on his positions. A box barrage could also be used to prevent the enemy from reinforcing a position to be attacked. In a trench raid of March 1917, the 1st Battalion the Buffs were supported first by a creeping barrage, then by a box barrage once they were in the enemy trenches, to prevent German reinforcement or counter-attack. It was aided with dummy bombardments on other sections of the line to confuse the enemy.

== Advantages and drawbacks ==
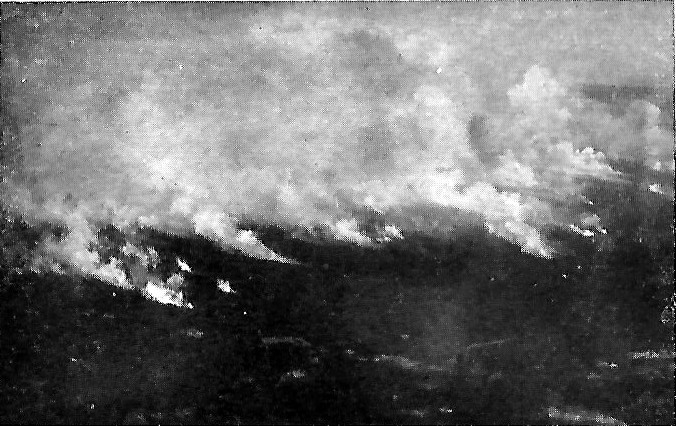
German Trommelfeuer on the Chemin des Dames (31 July 1917)

It was soon appreciated how important it was for the attacking troops to follow the barrage closely ("leaning on the barrage"), without allowing time for the defenders to recover from the shock of bombardment and emerge from their dug-outs; the French reckoned they should be suffering 10% of their casualties from their own artillery if they were close enough to the barrage. Ideally the attackers should be into the enemy positions before the defenders had time to recover their composure after the terror of an intense bombardment, emerge from shelters and man their firing positions. On the First day of the Somme, and in the later French Nivelle Offensive on the Chemin des Dames, the barrage outpaced the infantry, allowing the defenders to recover and emerge from their dug-outs, with disastrous results for the attackers. By the end of World War I it was realised that the important effect of the barrage was to demoralise and suppress the enemy, rather than physical destruction; a short, intense bombardment immediately followed by infantry assault was more effective than the weeks of grinding bombardment used in 1916.

A creeping barrage could maintain the element of surprise, with the guns opening fire only shortly before the assault troops moved off. It was useful when enemy positions had not been thoroughly reconnoitred, as it did not depend on identifying individual targets in advance. On the other hand, it was wasteful of ammunition and guns, as much of the fire would inevitably fall on ground containing no enemy.

The World War I barrage with programmed lifts had the effect of confining the infantry advance to the artillery schedule, and of requiring the use of linear tactics, restricting infantry manoeuvre. Infiltration tactics later proved more effective than advancing in rigid lines, and the infiltration phase of German stormtrooper attacks could not use a creeping barrage; but the opening phase of the German spring offensive (Operation Michael) was still supported by a massive creeping barrage, containing a heavy mix of gas shells. The importance of the barrage was such that traditional infantry tactics, such as reliance on the infantry's own firepower to support its movement, were sometimes forgotten.

In the featureless Western Desert in World War II, one benefit of the barrage was that it enabled the infantry to conform their line to the barrage, ensuring that their line of advance was correct. By 1943 the barrage was considered to dissipate firepower and to constrain the infantry into advancing in rigid lines. A barrage could severely churn up the ground, especially in soft going, and impede the progress of the attacking troops.

== Use in World War I ==
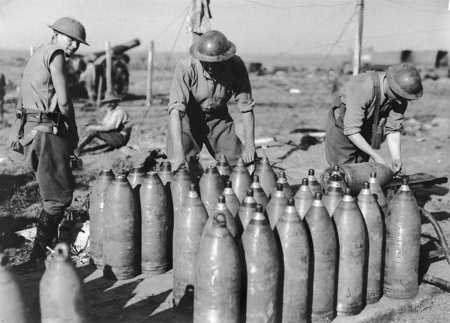
Men of the Australian Heavy Artillery capping 8-inch (200 mm) shells with '106' (instantaneous) fuzes.

It is sometimes claimed that creeping barrage was first used during World War I in the battle of Gorlice in May 1915 (part of the Gorlice–Tarnów offensive) by General Tadeusz Rozwadowski, but in fact infantry assault was simply preceded by a four-hour shelling of the Russian defences. The first day of the battle of the Somme saw another attempt at a large-scale creeping barrage which had been planned in anticipation of the infantry's anticipated ability to advance relatively unhampered across the battlefield due to a heavy, week-long preparatory bombardment. For example, on XV Corps front, the barrage was programmed to lift 50 yards (46 m) every minute. Complications arose however in British protocols to prevent friendly-fire casualties which at the time dictated that shellfire was to be kept over one hundred yards (91 m) away from their own uncovered infantry. In many cases no man's land was narrower than the allowable 'safe' distance and as such the barrage did not protect the men as they went 'over the top' and advanced towards the German trenches.

Further, as the British infantry was slowed far beyond the expected pace of advance across no-man's land, all along the Somme front it proved impossible for the infantry to keep up with the pace of the barrage. However, the tactic was further refined as the Battle of the Somme wore on and by September 1916 the creeping barrage became a standard tactic for infantry attacks, and soon spread to the French Army, enabling the French recapture of Fort Vaux at the Battle of Verdun in November 1916. By the later stages of the Battle of the Somme, the British had improved the accuracy of and confidence in their artillery fire and had learned the lessons of keeping infantry close to the barrage: the British Expeditionary Force (BEF) circulated an aerial observer's report commending a "most perfect wall of fire" followed up within 50 yards (46 m) by the infantry of 50th (Northumbrian) Division, enabling them to take a village with little opposition. A report said "Experience has shown that it is far better to risk a few casualties from an occasional short round from our own artillery than to suffer the many casualties which occur when the bombardment is not closely followed up". A creeping barrage was essential to the success of the Canadian Expeditionary Force in the capture of Vimy Ridge in April, 1917. The creeping barrage was used during the action of Tell 'Asur on 12 March 1918 in the Sinai and Palestine Campaign. Six months later, it was used with devastating effect during the Battle of Megiddo (1918) when 18-pdr and Royal Horse Artillery formed a creeping barrage which fired in front of the advancing infantry up to their extreme range while 4.5-inch howitzers fired beyond the barrage, while heavy artillery were employed in counter battery work. The creeping barrage moved at a rate of between 50 yards (46 m), 75 yards (69 m) and 100 yards (91 m) per minute.

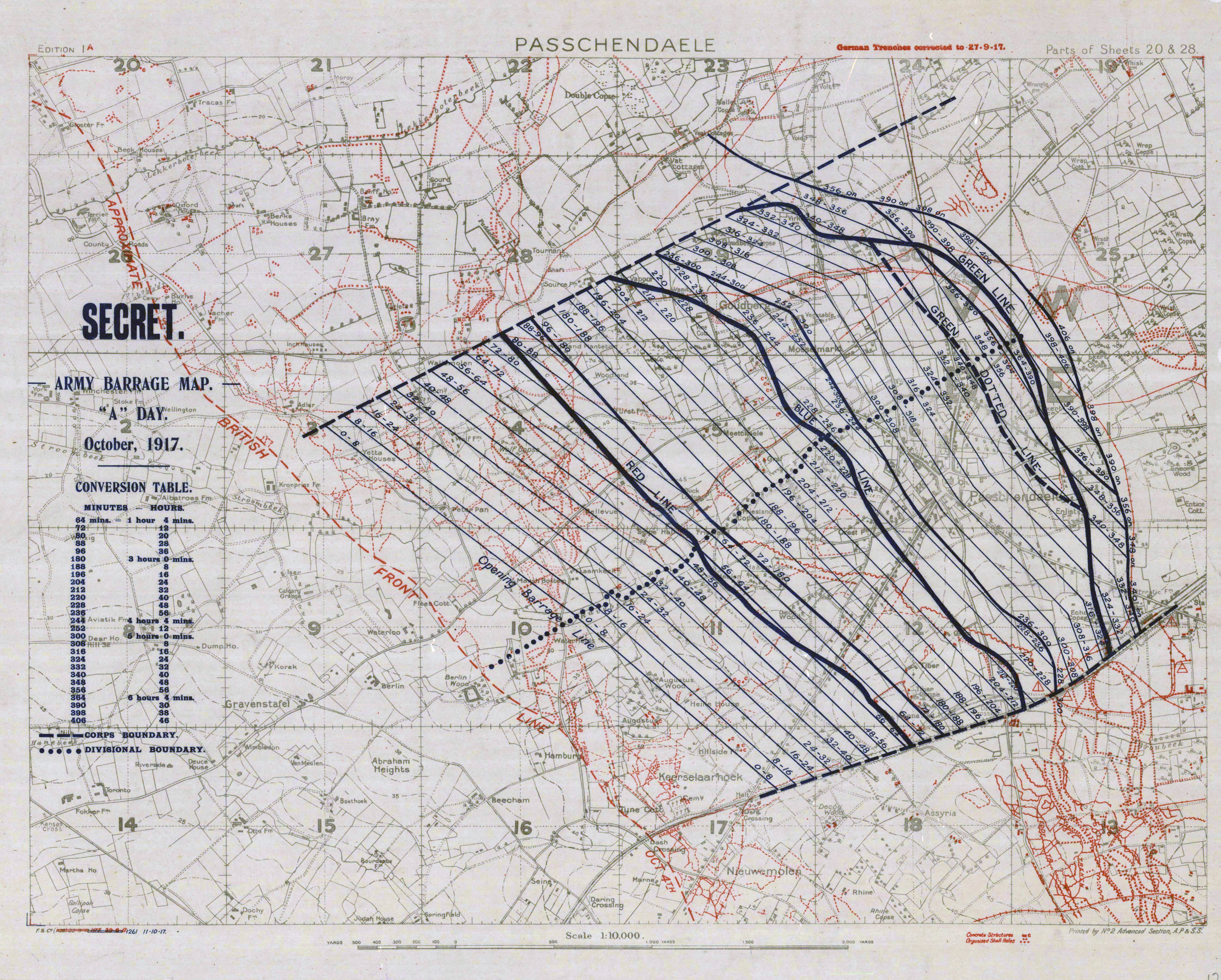
Planning map for an Allied creeping barrage at the First Battle of Passchendaele.

At first, British creeping barrages consisted only of shrapnel shells but an equal mix of HE was soon added, in some cases later supplemented by smoke shells. The creeping barrage would advance at a rate of 100 yards (91 m) every one to six minutes, depending on terrain and conditions; although six minutes was found to be too slow. By the Battle of Arras in 1917, the creeping barrage was huge and complex, with five or six lines of fire covering a depth of 2,000 yards (1,800 m) ahead of the infantry.

Back barrages were fired, in which rearmost lines of the barrage reversed direction, and machine gun barrages were introduced. False barrages attempted to deceive the enemy about Allied intentions or to force him to reveal his positions. The creeping barrage was used to great effect in the Canadian success at the Battle of Vimy Ridge where the men had been extensively trained to move forward in the 'Vimy Glide' – a 100-yard per three minute pace (30 m/min) which kept the infantry directly behind the barrage. The opening attack of the Battle of Passchendaele was covered by a barrage of shrapnel and HE on a colossal scale, fired by over 3,000 British guns and howitzers: one 18-pounder for every 15 yards (14 m) of front, and a heavy howitzer for every 50 yards (46 m), with yet more guns in the French sector. The British barrage advanced 100 yards (91 m) every four minutes, with the infantry following as close as 50 yards (46 m) from the bursting shells. One battery's programme required 45 lifts. As each objective was reached, the barrage settled 500 yards (460 m) beyond the new position, combing back and forth to disrupt expected German counter-attacks, while some of the artillery moved forward to support the next phase of the advance.

On the Eastern Front, German Colonel Georg Bruchmüller developed a form of double creeping barrage, with the first line of the barrage consisting of gas shells. His ideas were applied on the Western Front in the German spring offensive of 1918.

The day of the lengthy large-scale preliminary barrage had largely passed by the end of World War I, at least in Western nations, with the realisation that best results were achieved by neutralising the enemy rather than attempting physical destruction, and that short, concentrated bombardments, including creeping barrages, were more effective in neutralising the enemy than extended bombardment. Once open warfare returned after the breaking of the Hindenburg Line in September 1918 the British fired far fewer creeping barrages, using more lifts and concentrations instead.

Attacks by tanks do not need the same form of artillery support, and the single barrage along the entire front of the advance had even been abandoned by the battle of Cambrai in 1917. More sophisticated fire control enabled infantry to call down artillery fire in direct support, or targeting of identified enemy positions. Nevertheless, barrages remained in use. On 31 August 1918 the attack of the U.S. 32nd Division was preceded by a walking barrage. After first passing over the German line, the barrage returned twice more, attempting to catch the defenders returning to their firing positions from their dugouts, or to keep them underground when the real assault went in.

== Use in World War II ==
The barrage remained in use in World War II, but was no longer the dominant artillery plan. In the absence of the huge set-piece infantry assaults of World War I, barrages were on a smaller scale. For the opening of the second Battle of El Alamein, for example, a barrage was considered by British Lieutenant-General Bernard Montgomery's planners, but rejected in favour of fierce concentrations on known or suspected targets in turn. Along a 12,000-yard (11,000 m) front, 456 guns were considered insufficient for a true creeping barrage (at Neuve Chapelle there had been one gun for every four yards of front). But creeping and rolling barrages were used in some divisional sectors and in later phases of the Alamein battle. For Operation Supercharge on 1–2 November 1942, the attack in the 2nd New Zealand Division sector was preceded by a creeping barrage of 192 guns along a 4,000-yard (3,700 m) front, firing on three lines. There was almost one 25-pounder for every 20 yards of front, plus two medium regiments thickening the barrage.

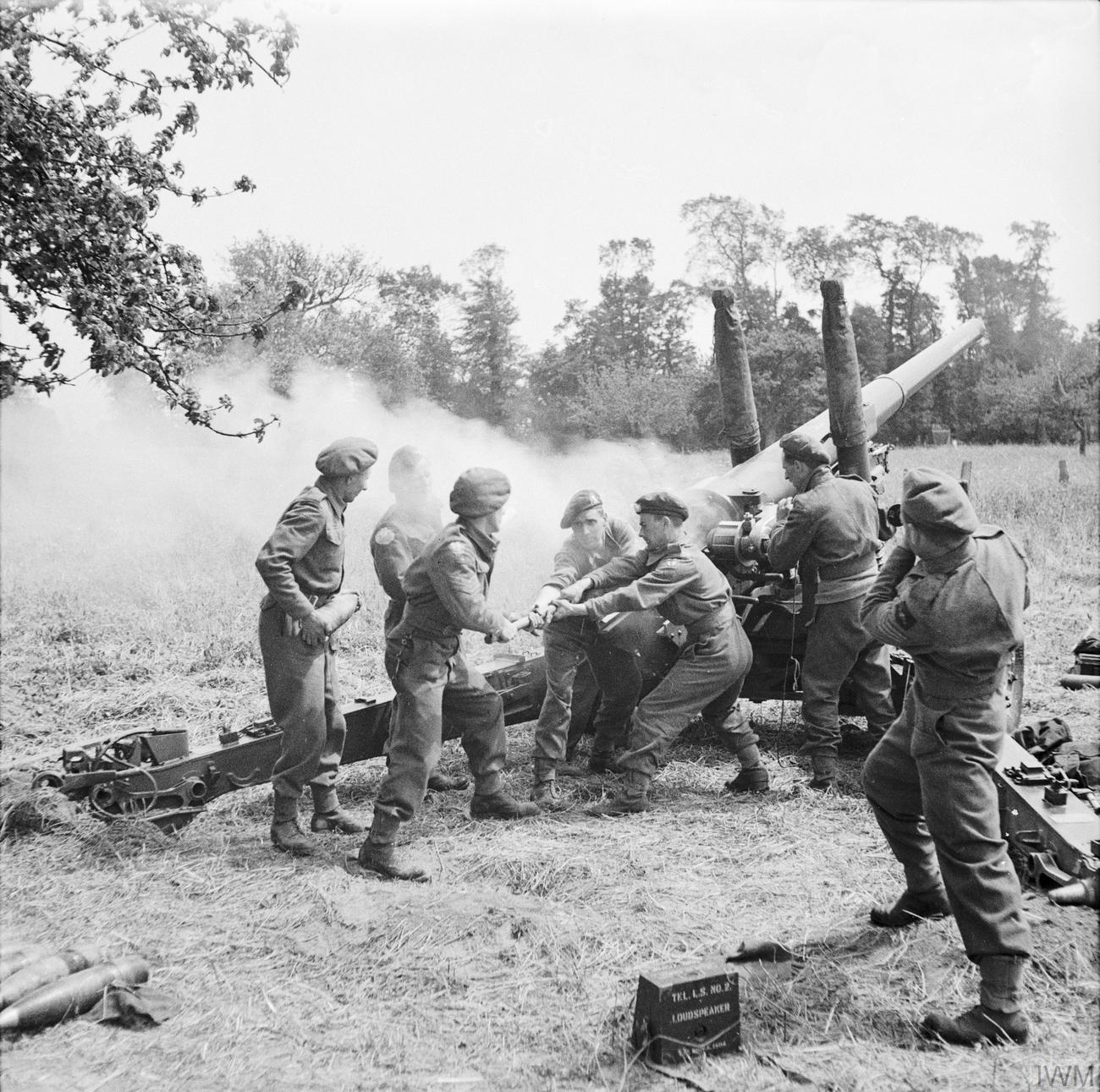
British 4.5 inch gun in action near Tilly-sur-Seulles during the Battle of Normandy, 1944.

By the fighting in Tunisia, more guns were available and the defenders were more concentrated than in the Western Desert. The artillery plan for the British attack at Wadi Akarit in April 1943 involved eight barrages in three phases ahead of the advances of 50th (Northumbrian) and 51st (Highland) Infantry Divisions. They included a standing barrage to mark the start line in the dark and enable the infantry to form up in the right alignment; a barrage that wheeled left during the advance; and an on-call creeping barrage. Nevertheless, attacks rarely relied solely on a barrage for artillery support: at Wadi Akarit pre-arranged concentrations on likely targets were called down by observers in the course of the assault.

Nevertheless, it remained in use in the Italian Campaign. In the assault on the Hitler Line during the Battle of Monte Cassino on 23 May 1944, 810 guns were amassed for the attack of I Canadian Corps. Three hundred of them fired on the first line of a 3,200-yard (2,900 m) wide barrage, beginning three minutes before the infantry moved off and lifting at a rate of 100 yards in five minutes. It was due to pause for an hour at the first objective, then lift at 100 yards per three minutes to the further objectives, but the timing was disrupted by heavy resistance and defensive artillery fire. The operation was later criticised for concentrating on too narrow a front, constrained by the need for enough guns to produce a dense barrage.

In the assault crossing of the Senio during the final offensive in Italy in 1945, dummy barrages were used to confuse the enemy, either misleading them as to the line of attack or drawing them out of shelters as the barrage passed, expecting an infantry assault, only to catch them with a renewed barrage or air attacks. On Monte Sole, U.S. artillery fired probably its heaviest barrage of the war, 75,000 shells in a half-hour to clear the advance of the South Africans.

During the Battle of Normandy, a creeping barrage fired from 344 guns preceded the opening attacks of 15th (Scottish) Infantry Division in Operation Epsom on 26 June 1944.

For the opening of Operation Veritable, the push to the Rhine, the fire of 1,050 field and heavy guns was supplemented by 850 barrels of pepper-pot barrage: other weapons – mortars, machine guns, tanks, anti-tank guns, anti-aircraft guns and rockets – supplementing the field guns. The true barrage of the British XXX Corps began at 09:20, building in intensity over the next hour, 500 guns shooting at a line 500 yards deep. The barrage included smoke shells to screen the attackers forming up behind the barrage. From 10.30 the barrage was pure high explosive and began to roll forward. A 300-yard lift was made every 12 minutes, the lifts being signalled to the infantry by yellow smoke shells, and the barrage paused for ½ hour at each defensive line. 2,500 shells were fired per square kilometre per hour until the barrage stopped at 16:30.

The barrage remained in Soviet doctrine in World War II, where the creeping barrage by massed guns was the standard accompaniment to an infantry assault. The Soviet artillery had plenty of guns. Some 7,000 guns and mortars were massed for the counter-attack at the battle of Stalingrad, and huge bombardments remained standard for the rest of the war. During the Soviet advances in 1944–45, the tactic was used extensively throughout the Eastern Front such as the Vyborg–Petrozavodsk Offensive, the Battle of the Seelow Heights, and the Battle of Berlin.

== Korean War and after ==
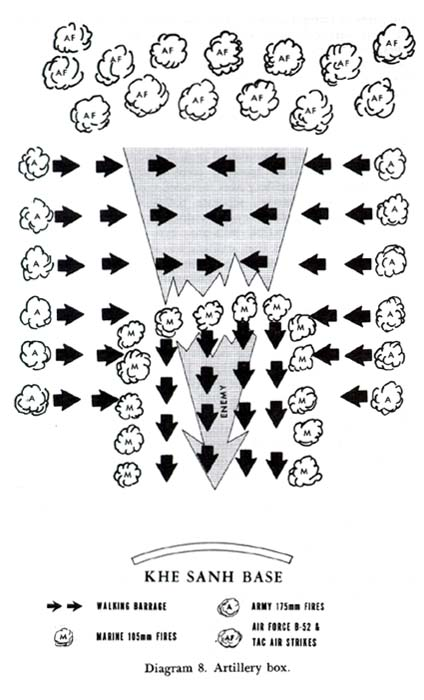
Illustration of a complex walking barrage, used during defence of Khe Sanh, Vietnam.

The barrage continued in use into the Korean War. At the Battle of Pork Chop Hill, UN forces employed on-call, pre-registered defensive fires called flash fire to defend its outposts, in which artillery laid down a box barrage in a horseshoe-shaped pattern around the outpost. It was still in use in the Vietnam War.

In the 1982 Falklands War, the assault of 42 Commando Royal Marines on Mount Harriet was preceded by a moving concentration from supporting artillery, firing some 100 yards ahead of the advancing Marines. Later phases of the attack used a pepperpot fire, including Milan anti-tank missiles. However, neither of these were true barrages with fire aimed at successive lines to a strict timetable. The term Barrage as a method of fire control was not included in the 1965 ABCA artillery agreement nor its successor NATO STANAG.

== General use of the word ==
The word barrage, imported from the French for "barrier" around 1915, means a coordinated bombardment as a static or moving barrier, as described in this article. The word has also entered general language, where it has come to mean any intense sequence of words or missiles – such as a barrage of questions. Nowadays, any form of artillery fire of more than one round may be described as a barrage in general language. Even military historians use it in a non-technical sense, referring to any intense artillery fire.

== See also ==
- Broadside
- Salvo
- Fusillade
- Saturation fire
- Time On Target
- Barrage balloon
