= Saturation fire =

Military strategy

Saturation fire is a saturation attack using an intense level of artillery bombardment or rapid direct fire (from automatic weapons such as machine guns, autocannons or rotary guns) that is designed to overwhelm a target area with lethal firepower, for the purpose of suppression, area denial or mass destruction of the enemy.

== Artillery ==
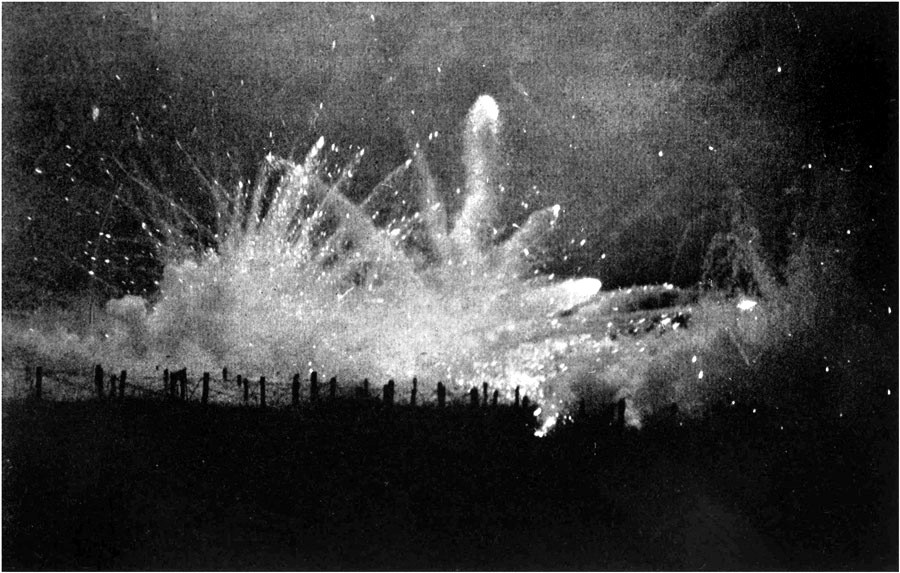
A German barrage falling on Allied trenches at Ypres, probably during the second battle in 1915.

Saturational indirect fire might be used to bombard an area just before an offensive. Another kind of intensity used to bombard an area during an offensive is a barrage. Saturation bombardment is used most of the time to shock enemy forces and lower their morale and ability to fight.

In the Battle of the Bulge, German troops used Werfer rocket batteries to do saturation fire on Allied positions, particularly prior to an attack. Benjamin Colby claims that the U.S. did saturation fire-bombing of Dresden in 1945.

During the Vietnam War, the US military used saturation fire against the Vietnamese forces. In one example in 1972, US Air Force did saturation fire around a bunker where seven US advisers alongside a number of South Vietnamese ARVN soldiers were surrounded by NVA forces which had been subjecting the bunker to a withering attack for days.

== Machine guns and small arms ==
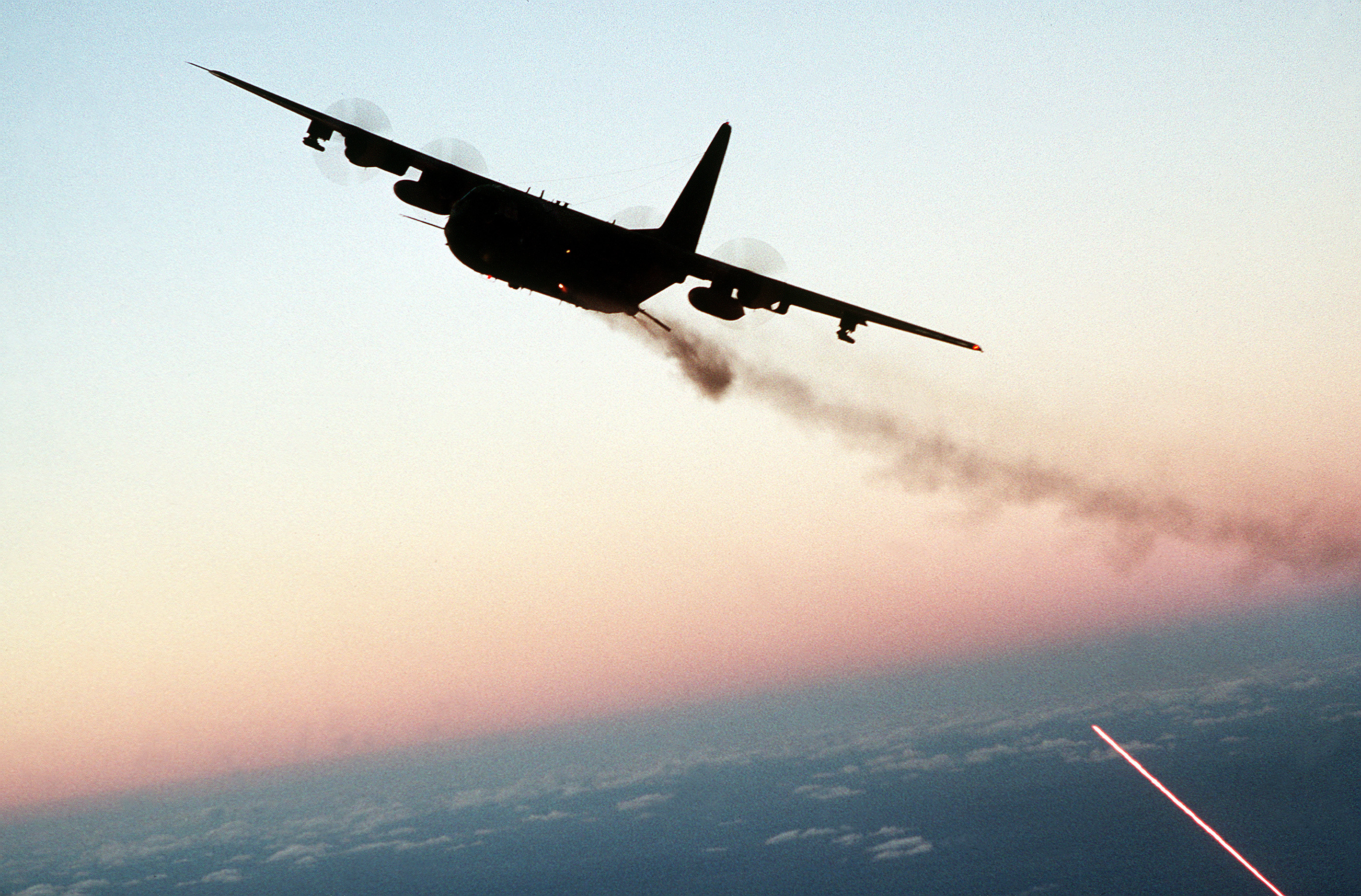
Smoke is visible as an AC-130 fires its rotary guns during twilight operations in 1988

High-rate of fire automatic weapons, especially belt-fed, crew-served medium/heavy machine guns, can be used to deliver a dense volume of direct fire at enemy positions. A history of German military doctrine states that "...laying down saturation fire [with small arms] will keep your enemy's head down while allowing you to get on with the approach to the objective. During the Vietnam War, AC-130 gunships incorporated side-firing 20 mm Gatling-style rotary cannons which allowed them to provide area-saturation fire as the aircraft circled over a target. Another use of saturation fire in the Vietnam War was with "guntrucks" in convoys. These "2 1/2-ton cargo vehicles" with "two M-60 machine gunners" would "... provide a rapid, retaliatory saturation fire within the critical first 3 minutes of an enemy attack [e.g., an ambush of the convoy]".

The use of automatic weapons for saturation fire has been criticized by a major US gun maker. The president of ArmaLite stated that using an automatic rifle such as his company's AR-15 for saturation fire can waste ammunition, a situation which is particularly problematic in cases where soldiers have to carry their own ammunition. He argued that using carefully aimed semi-automatic fire can be more effective than sweeping enemy positions with random, full-automatic fire.

US soldier Paul Howe supports this view in his statement that "volume [of full-automatic fire] in the wrong place is useless". An author argues that the widespread use of automatic rifles such as the M16 by the US Army in Vietnam, Cambodia and Laos, along with the "... concept of saturation fire and general abandonment of the principles of individual marksmanship and weapon performance" led to military failures; he argues that "...there must be a balance between accuracy and firepower in the general application".
