= Gryazev-Shipunov GSh-6-30 =

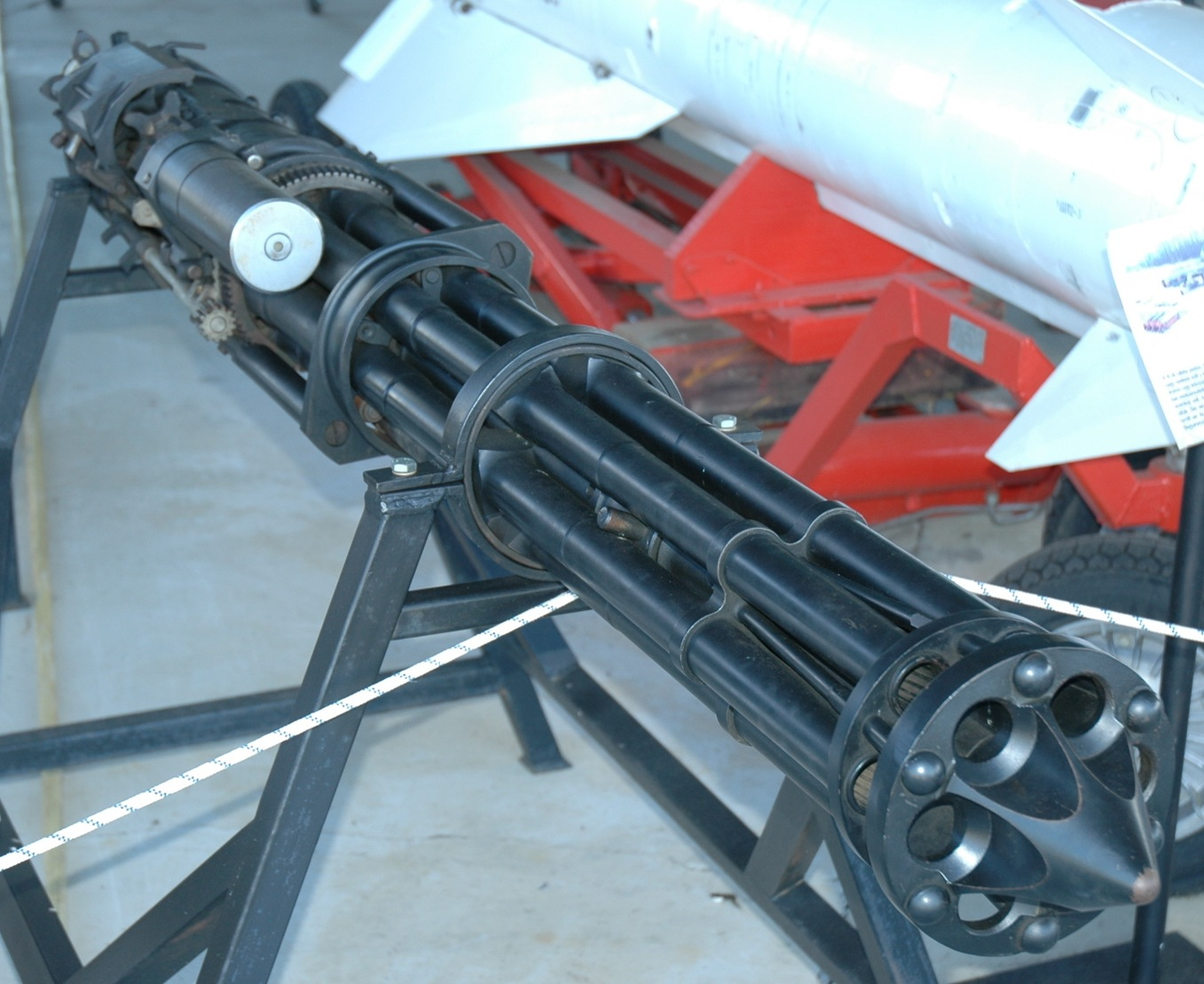
- Type: Rotary cannon
- Place of origin: Soviet Union

Service history
- In service: 1975–present

Production history
- Designer: KBP
- Manufacturer: KBP

Specifications
- Mass: 149 kg (328 lb); Projectile: 390 g (13¾ oz)
- Length: 2,040 millimetres (6.69 ft)
- Shell: 30×165mm
- Caliber: 30 mm (1.2 in)
- Barrels: 6
- Action: Gas actuated, electrically fired
- Rate of fire: 4,000–6,000 rounds/min
- Muzzle velocity: 845 m/s (2,770 ft/s)

The Gryazev-Shipunov GSh-6-30 (Russian: Грязев-Шипунов ГШ-6-30) is a Russian 30 mm rotary cannon aircraft-mounted and naval autocannon used by Soviet and later CIS military aircraft. The GSh-6-30 fires a 30×165mm, 390 g (13 3/4 oz) projectile.

== Description ==
The GSh-6-30, designed in the early 1970s and entering service in 1975, has a six barrel design that is similar to the Gryazev-Shipunov GSh-6-23. It was based on the naval AO-18 used in the AK-630 system. Unlike most modern rotary cannons, it is gas-operated rather than hydraulically driven, allowing it to "spin up" to maximum rate of fire more quickly, allowing more rounds to be placed on target in a short-duration burst. This makes the weapon advantageous in dogfights, where pilots often have a very small window for engaging the enemy. Ignition is electrical, as with the smaller GSh-6-23.

On the MiG-27 "Flogger" the GSh-6-30 had to be mounted obliquely to absorb recoil. The gun was noted for its high (often uncomfortable) vibration and extreme noise. The airframe vibration led to fatigue cracks in fuel tanks, numerous radio and avionics failures, the necessity of using runways with floodlights for night flights (as the landing lights on the plane would often be destroyed), tearing or jamming of the forward landing gear doors (leading to at least three crash landings), cracking of the reflector gunsight, an accidental jettisoning of the cockpit canopy and at least one case of the instrument panel falling off in flight. The weapons also dealt extensive collateral damage, as the sheer numbers of fragments from detonating shells was sufficient to damage aircraft flying within a 200-meter radius from the impact center, including the aircraft firing.

The principal application for the GSh-6-30 is the MiG-27, which carries the weapon in a gondola under the fuselage, primarily for strafing and ground attack. It was fitted to some Su-25TM aircraft, but subsequently replaced with the GSh-30-2 twin-barreled autocannon of the original Su-25. It is also used as the gun component of the CADS-N-1 Kashtan close-in weapon system.

== History ==
While the GSh-6-30K was designed for use on aircraft, the gun was repurposed for use on armoured cars during the Yemeni Civil War.

== Variants ==
- GSh-6-30M;
- AO-18L; version used by ABM-BCM30 remote weapon station.
- GSh-6-30K; Naval variant of GSh-6-30, also known as AO-18 used in AK-630 CIWS system.
- AO-18K; Modernized AO-18 used by Kashtan CIWS.
- AO-18KD; Further improved AO-18K with a higher rate of fire and extended range used in AK-630M2, Palma/Palash and Pantsir-M CIWS systems.

== Users ==
- China
- India
- Russian Federation
- Ukraine
- Vietnam
- Yemen

=== Former user ===
- Soviet Union

== See also ==
- GAU-8 Avenger
- Gryazev-Shipunov GSh-30-1
- Gryazev-Shipunov GSh-30-2
- Gryazev-Shipunov GSh-6-23
- Gryazev-Shipunov GSh-23
- Yakushev-Borzov YakB-12.7mm machine gun
- Glagolev-Shipunov-Gryazev GShG-7.62
- Nudelman-Rikhter NR-30
- Rikhter R-23
- Shipunov 2A42
- List of Russian weaponry
- List of multiple-barrel firearms
