= T249 Vigilante =

Self-propelled anti-aircraft gun

37mm T250 Vigilante
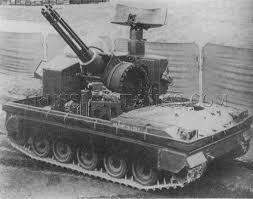
- The T250 on M113 chassis as T249 Vigilante B
- Type: Autocannon
- Place of origin: United States

Production history
- Designer: Springfield Armory
- Designed: 1956–1962
- No. built: 6

Specifications
- Length: 130 in (3.3 m)
- Barrel length: 100 in (2.5 m)
- Cartridge: 37×219mmSR T68
- Barrels: 6
- Action: rotary
- Rate of fire: Maximum 3,000 rpm in anti-aircraft use, decreased to 120 rpm for ground targets
- Muzzle velocity: 915 m/s (3,000 ft/s)
- Feed system: 192 round rotating magazine

The T249 Vigilante was a prototype 37 mm self-propelled anti-aircraft gun (SPAAG) designed as a replacement for the Bofors 40 mm gun in both towed and self-propelled (M42 Duster) forms in US Army service. The system consisted of a 37 mm T250 six-barrel rotary cannon mounted on a modified M113 armored personnel carrier chassis, with an alternate trailer-mounted variant designated T248 Vigilante A.

By the early 1960s, the US Army declared that gun-based systems were outdated, and canceled further development in favor of the MIM-46 Mauler missile system that also failed to enter service. In the end the M163, a M61 Vulcan mounted on an M113, was used.

The designer, the Sperry Utah Engineering Laboratory, later revived the Vigilante, rechambering it for NATO-standard 35×228mm rounds and mounting it on an M48 Patton tank chassis for the Division Air Defense (DIVAD) contest. However, it ultimately lost to Ford's M247 Sergeant York (twin 40mm Bofors) that also failed to enter service.

== Development ==
Very little information exists of the T249 Vigilante and its T250 cannon. The conceptual design for the T250 cannon was initiated in 1956. While the design of cannon of this caliber would ordinarily be handled by Watervliet Arsenal, it was decided that Springfield Armory would take responsibility due to their previous development experience with smaller caliber rotary cannon such the 20mm T171. The T250 was the largest Gatling gun ever assembled. Its 37×219mmSR round was based upon a shortened and necked-down 40×311mmR Bofors cartridge case. Hydraulically powered, the gun was able to vary between 120 rpm for (especially stationary) ground targets and 3,000 rpm for air targets.

It had a 192-round drum magazine, which in the maximum 3,000 rpm mode would have equated to approximately 4 seconds of fire. When Springfield engineers finished their work in 1962, the design was handed over to Watervliet for production. The Sperry Utah Engineering Laboratory was selected to handle the integration of the T250 gun with the modified M113 chassis to create the T249.

== Surviving Examples ==
One T249 Vigilante is currently displayed at the Air Defense Artillery Training Support Facility, at Ft. Sill, OK. This example was previously located at the US Army Ordnance Museum in Aberdeen, MD. A T250 rotary cannon is also on display next to the T249 as of July 2023. A T250 rotary cannon is on display in Wehrtechnische Studiensammlung in Koblenz, Germany.

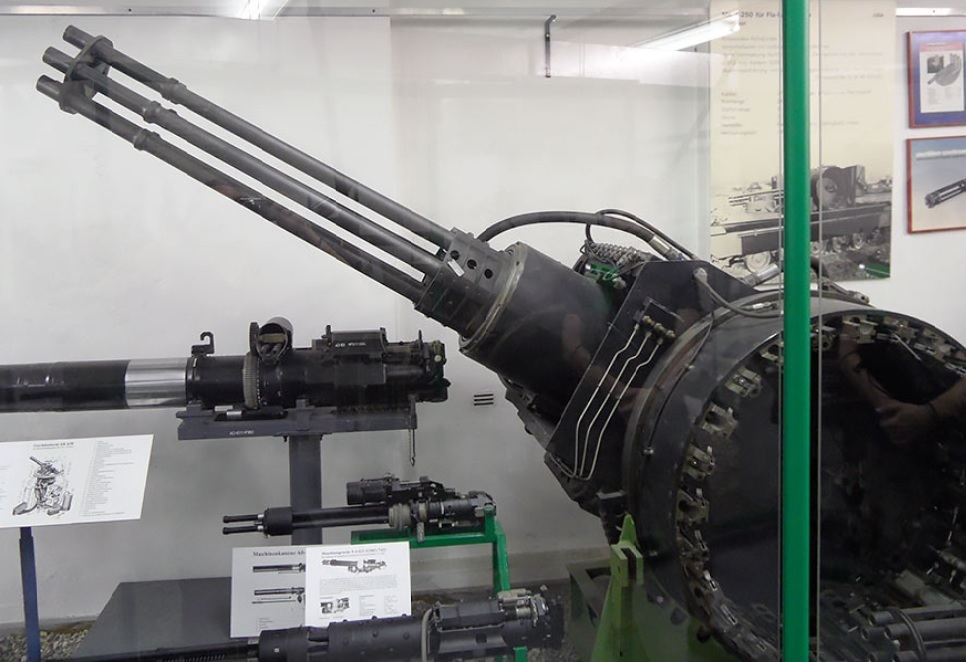
A preserved T250 rotary cannon at the Bundeswehr Museum of German Defense Technology
