= Rotary barrel =

Multiple barreled automatic firearm

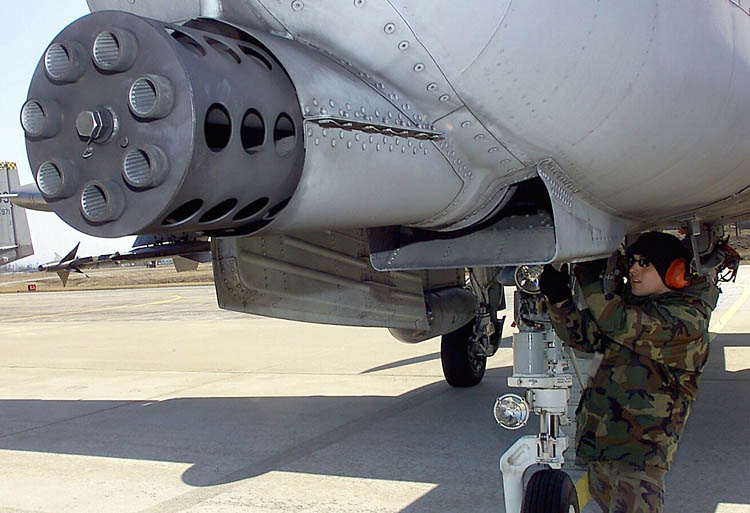
The GAU-8 Avenger seven-barrelled 30 mm rotary cannon of an A-10 Thunderbolt II

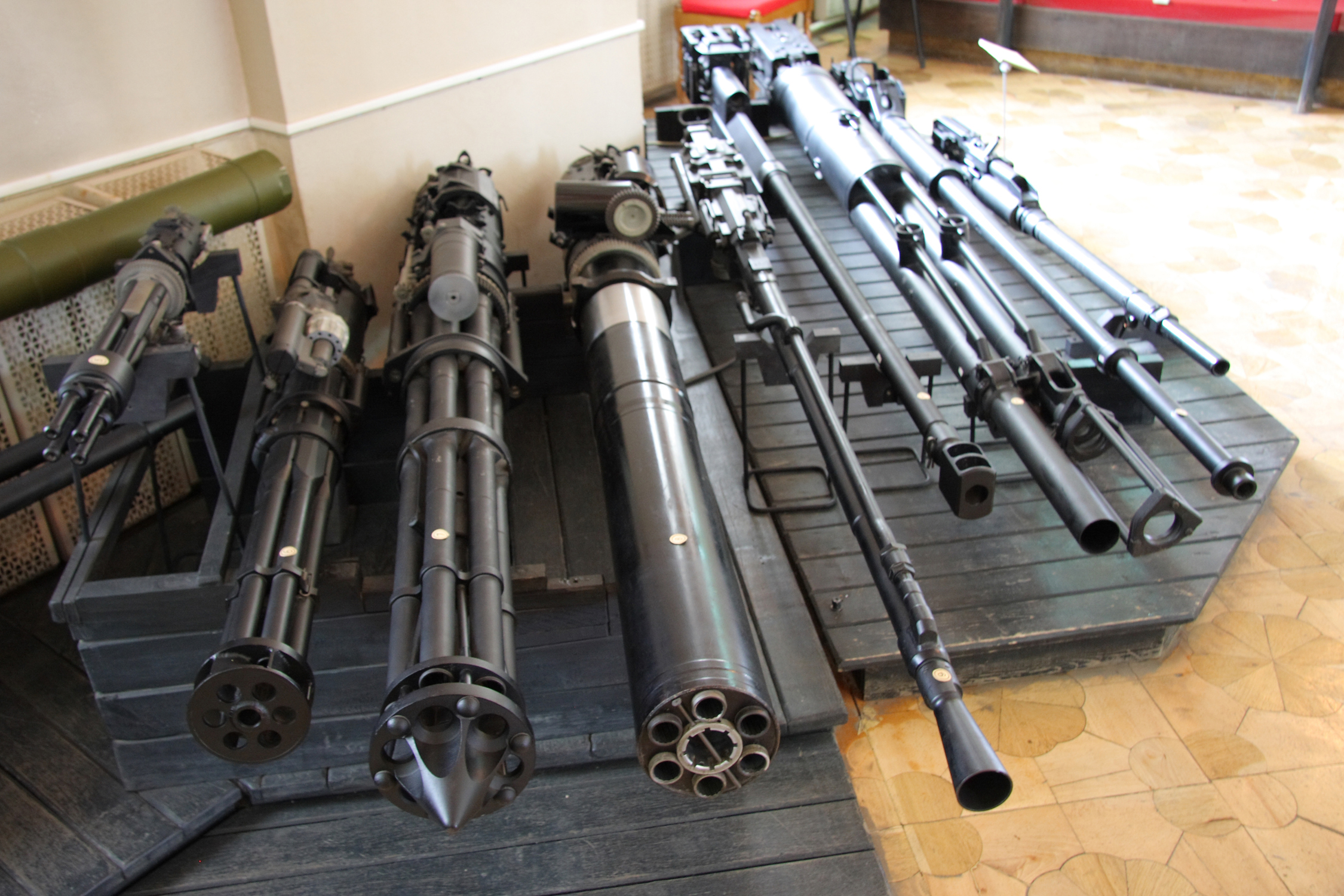
Four Soviet/Russian rotary cannons arranged in ascending caliber, from the left: GShG-7.62, GSh-6-23, GSh-6-30, AO-18

In automatic firearm design, a rotary barrel, or gatling barrel, is a multiple-barrel assembly which rotates around an axle to deliver a sustained saturation fire at much greater rates of fire than single-barreled autocannons of the same caliber. The loading, firing and ejection functions are performed simultaneously in different barrels as the whole assembly rotates, and the rotation also permits the barrels some time to cool.

Such weapons may be called rotary cannon or rotary machine gun depending on caliber, as well as gatling cannon etc, from the Gatling gun, the first rotary barrel machine gun. Other names includes minigun, from the General Electric rotary machine gun M134 Minigun.

External and self-driven rotary cannons are used in aircraft over reciprocating bolt autocannons which are more prone to jamming in high g environments. The rotating barrels on nearly all modern Gatling-type guns are powered by an external force such as an electric motor, although internally powered gas-operated versions have also been developed.

The cyclic multi-barrel design synchronizes the firing/reloading sequence. Each barrel fires a single cartridge when it reaches a certain position in the rotation, after which the spent casing is ejected at a different position and then a new round is loaded at another position. During the cycle, the barrel has more time to dissipate some heat away to the surrounding air.

Due to the usually cumbersome size and weight of rotary cannons, they are typically mounted on weapons platforms such as vehicles, aircraft, or ships, where they are often used in close-in weapon systems.

== History ==
In 1852 a revolving barrel gun with a unique method of ignition was proposed by an Irish immigrant to America by the name of Delany.

The Gatling gun was another gun to use rotating barrels. It was designed by the American inventor Dr. Richard J. Gatling in 1861 and patented in 1862. Hand cranked and hopper fed, it could fire at a rate of 200 rounds per minute. The Gatling gun was a field weapon, first used in warfare during the American Civil War and subsequently by European and Russian armies.

The design was steadily improved; by 1876 the Gatling gun had a theoretical rate of fire of 1,200 rounds per minute, although 400 rounds per minute was more readily achievable in combat. By 1893, the M1893 Gatling gun could fire 800 to 900 rounds per minute. Gatling also developed examples of the M1893 powered by an electric motor driving the crank with a belt. Tests demonstrated the electric Gatling could fire up to 1,500 rpm in bursts.

Ultimately, the Gatling's weight and cumbersome artillery carriage hindered its ability to keep up with infantry forces over difficult ground. It was eventually superseded by lighter and more mobile machine guns such as the Maxim gun. All models of Gatling guns were declared obsolete by the U.S. Army in 1911, after 45 years of service.

== Development of modern Gatling-type guns ==
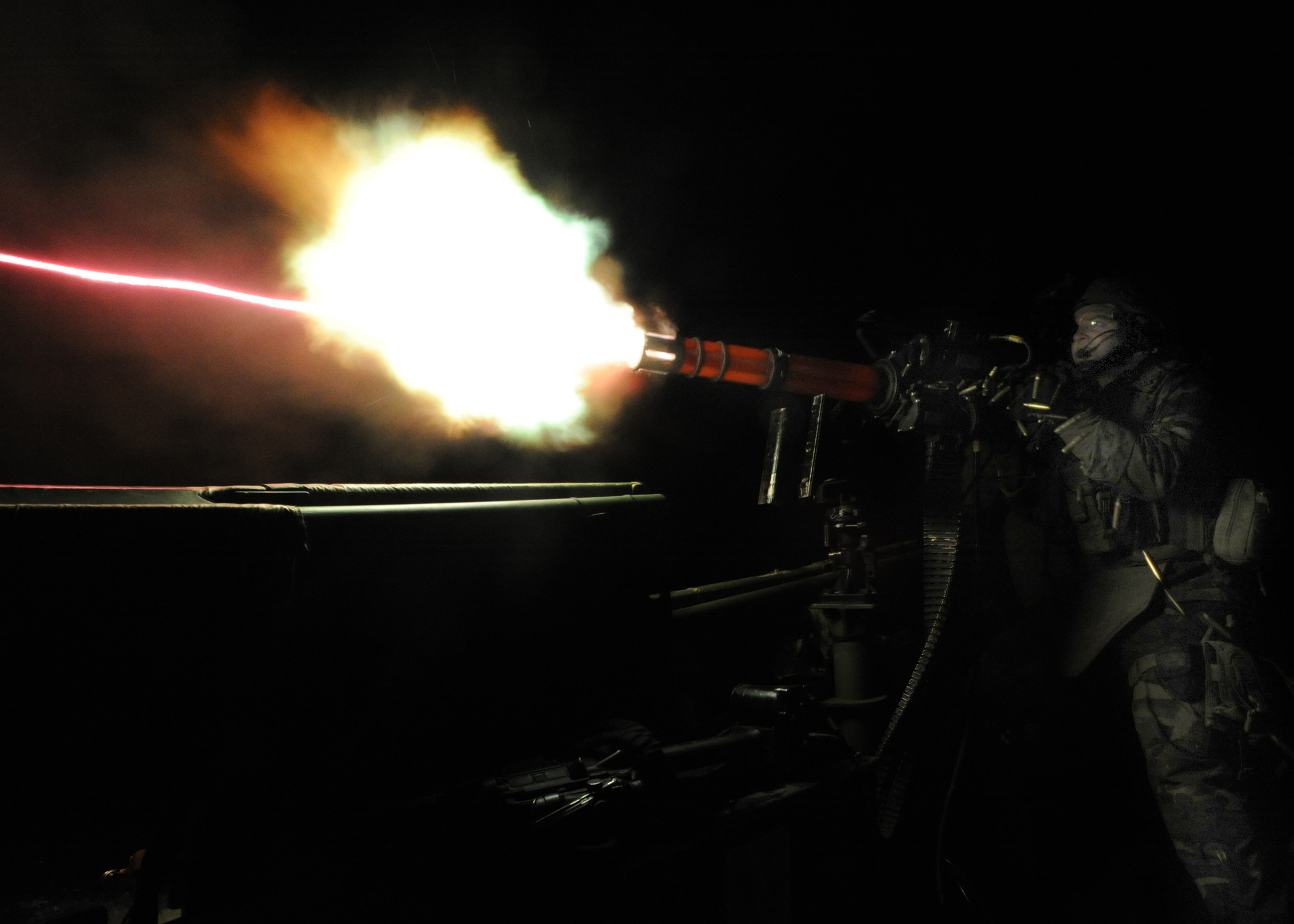
Barrel heating in a 7.62mm NATO GAU-17

After the Gatling gun was replaced in service by newer non-rotating, recoil- or gas-operated machine guns, the approach of using multiple rotating barrels fell into disuse for many decades. Some examples were developed during the interwar years but only existed as prototypes or were rarely used. During World War I, Imperial Germany worked on the Fokker-Leimberger, an externally powered 12-barrel Gatling gun that could fire more than 7,200 7.92×57mm rounds per minute.

After World War II, the U.S. Army Air Force determined that an automatic cannon of improved design with an extremely high rate of fire was required to achieve a sufficient number of large-caliber hits on fast-moving enemy jet aircraft. A larger-caliber cannon shell was deemed desirable as it could contain more explosives—compared to .30 and .50 caliber ammunition previously used—and thus able to destroy aircraft with only a few hits on target. However, autocannons suffered from a lower rate of fire than machine guns; a possible solution, the M39 revolver cannon, had problems with overheating and excessive barrel wear.

In June 1946, the General Electric Company was awarded a U.S. military defense contract to develop an aircraft gun with a high rate of fire which GE termed Project Vulcan. While researching prior work, ordnance engineers recalled the experimental electrically driven Gatling weapons of the turn of the 20th century. In 1946, a Model 1903 Gatling gun was borrowed from a museum and set up with an electric motor drive by General Electric engineers. During test firing, the 40-year-old design briefly managed a rate of fire of 5,000 rounds per minute.

In 1949 General Electric began testing the first model of its modified Gatling design, now called the Vulcan Gun. The first prototype was designated the T45 (Model A). It fired .60 in (15 mm) ammunition at about 2,500 rounds per minute from six barrels driven by an electric motor. In 1950, GE delivered ten initial model A T45 guns for evaluation. Thirty-three model C T45 guns were delivered in 1952 in three calibers: .60 cal., 20mm, and 27mm, for additional testing. After extensive testing, the T171 20mm gun was selected for further development. In 1956, the T171 20mm gun was standardized by the U.S. Army and U.S. Air Force as the M61 20mm Vulcan aircraft gun.

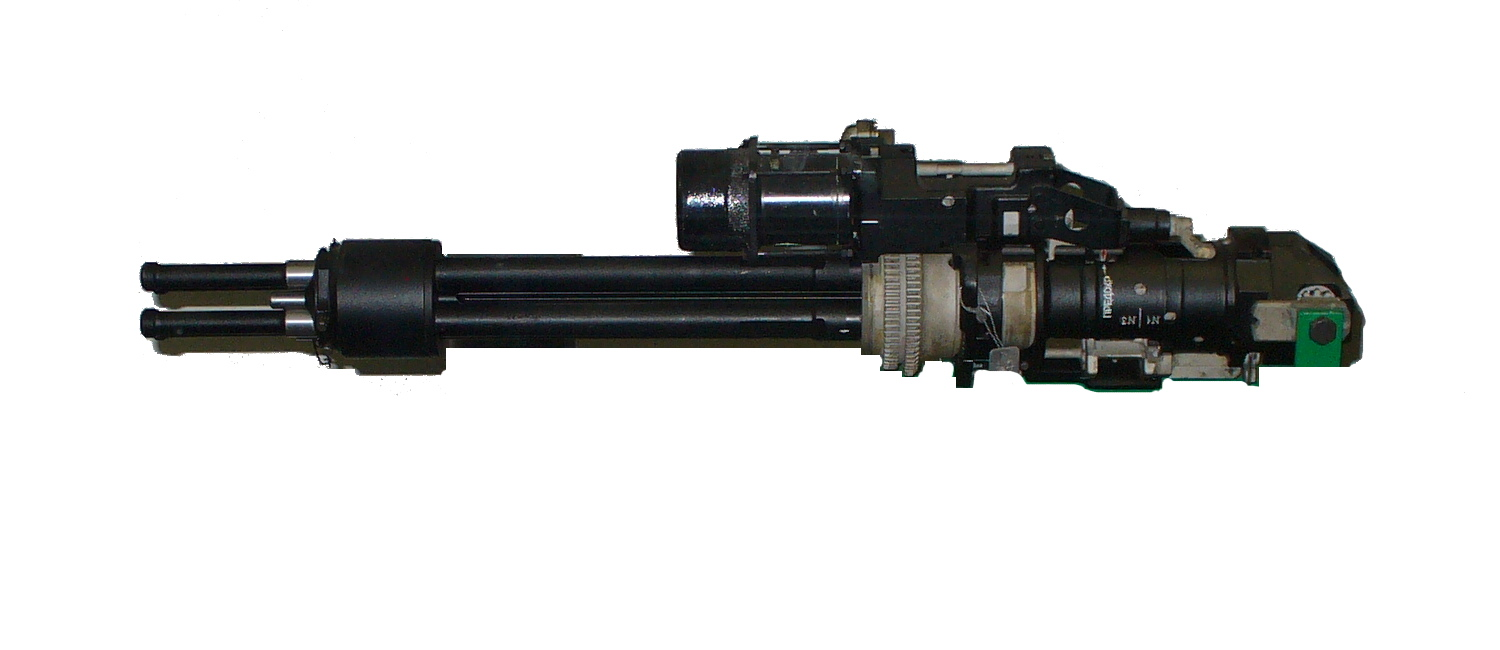
GShG-7.62, one of the few self-driven Gatlings.

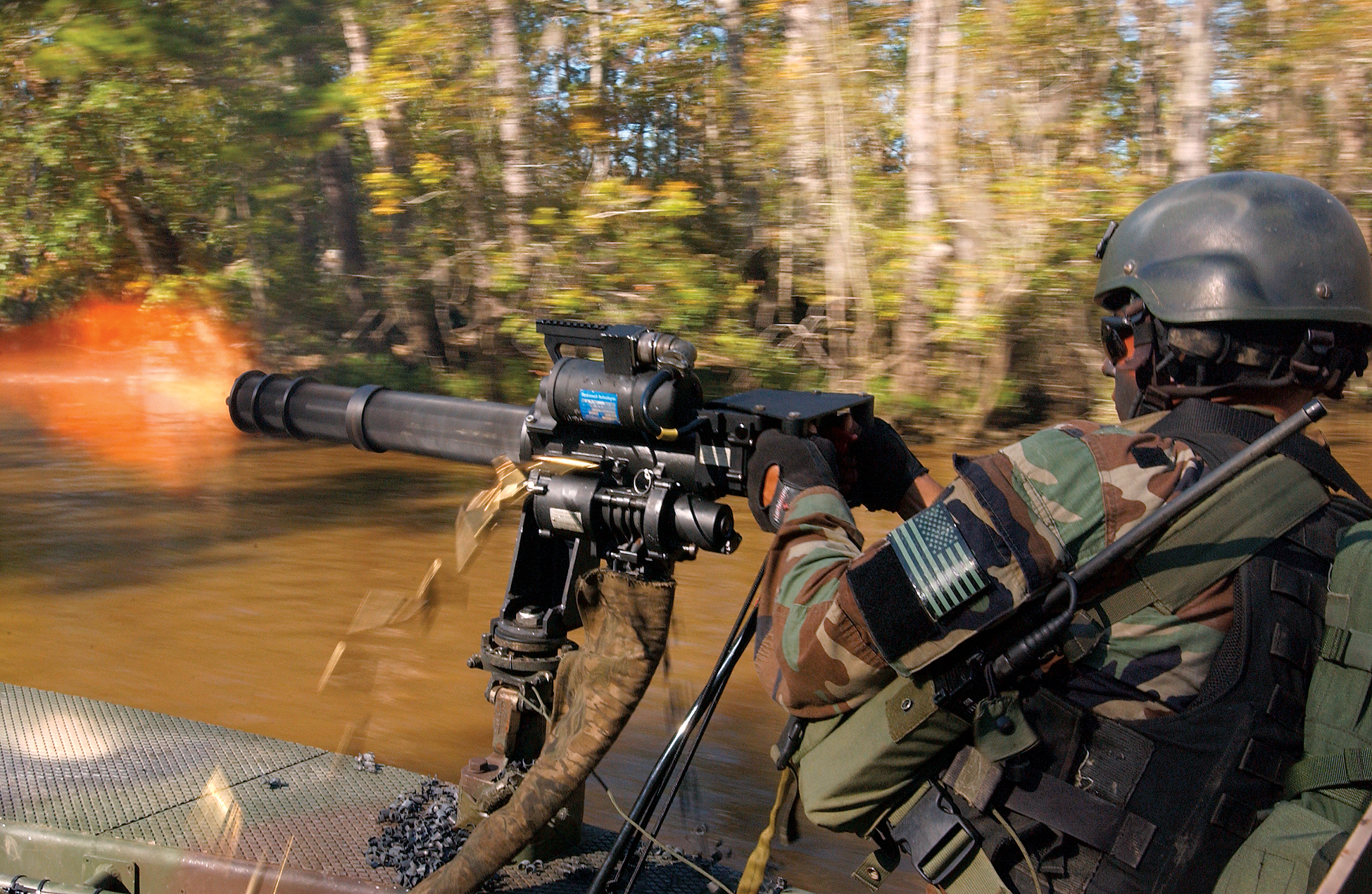
U.S. Special Warfare combatant-craft crewmen use a Gatling gun to lay down suppressing fire during a practice "hot" extraction of forces on a beach.

One of the main reasons for the resurgence of the electrically or hydraulically powered multiple-barrel design is the weapon's tolerance for continuously high rates of fire. For example, 1000 rounds per minute of continuous fire from a conventional single-barreled weapon ordinarily results in rapid barrel heating followed by stoppages caused by overheating. In contrast, a five-barreled rotary gun firing 1000 rounds per minute fires only 200 rounds per barrel per minute, an acceptable rate of fire for continuous use. A multiple-barrel design also overcomes the limiting factor of the loading and extraction sequence. In a single-barrel design, these tasks must alternate, limiting the rate of fire. A multiple-barrel design allows loading and extraction to occur simultaneously on different barrels as they rotate. The design is also resistant to defective ammunition, which can cause normal machine guns to malfunction when a cartridge fails to load, fire, or eject from the weapon. Since the power source of a multiple-barrel design is external, it can simply extract defective rounds as it would a regular, spent cartridge.

== Models ==
=== M61 Vulcan and other designs ===
The M61 Vulcan 20 mm autocannon is the best-known of a family of weapons designed by General Electric and currently manufactured by General Dynamics. The M61 is a six-barreled 20mm rotary cannon that fires at up to 6,600 rounds per minute. Similar systems are available in calibers ranging from 5.56 mm to 30 mm (the prototype T249 Vigilante AA platform featured a 37 mm chambering).

Another multi-barrel design is the hydraulically driven GAU-8 Avenger 30 mm autocannon, carried on the A-10 Thunderbolt II (Warthog) attack aircraft, a heavily armored close air-support aircraft. It is a seven-barreled cannon designed for tank-killing and is currently the largest bore multi-barrel weapon active in the U.S. arsenal, and heaviest autocannon ever mounted into an aircraft, outweighing the WW II German Bordkanone BK 7,5 75mm aircraft-mount, tank-killing single barrel autocannon by some 630 kg (1,389 lb), with ammunition.

The Gryazev-Shipunov GSh-6-23 and GSh-6-30 are Russian gas-powered rotary cannon with maximum cyclic rates of 9,000 to 10,000 rounds per minute.

=== Self-driven examples ===
While electric motors were used to rotate the Vulcan barrels, a few examples of self-operated Gatling-derived weapons use the blow-forward, recoil or gas impulse from their ammunition. The Bangerter machine gun uses a blow-forward operation and is the most complex example. The Slostin machine gun uses a similar operation but with gas pistons on each barrels. The GShG-7.62 machine gun and GSh-6-23, both use a more effective, simpler gas piston drive in the center of the barrel cluster.

=== Minigun ===
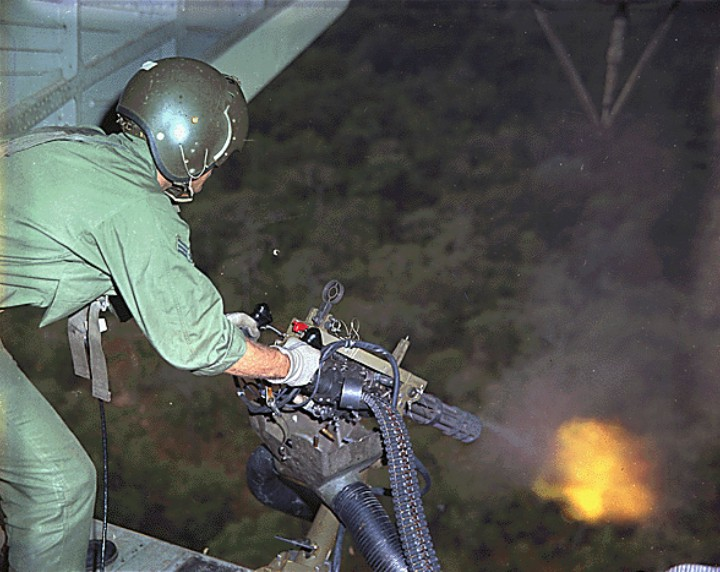
A rotating-barrel Minigun being fired from a combat rescue helicopter during the Vietnam War

During the Vietnam War, the 7.62 mm caliber M134 Minigun was originally created to arm rotary-wing aircraft, and could be fitted to various helicopters as either a crew-served or a remotely operated weapon. It has a rate of fire from 2,000 to 6,000 rounds per minute from a 4,000-round linked belt.

As the GAU-2B/A, the Minigun was also used on the U.S. Air Force AC-47, AC-119 and Lockheed AC-130 gunships. The AC-47 was known during the Vietnam War as "Puff the Magic Dragon" and was said to be "the only thing that scared the VC". This weapon was also used on selected USAF helicopters. With sophisticated navigation and target identification tools, Miniguns can be used effectively even against concealed targets. The crew's ability to concentrate the Minigun's fire very tightly produces the appearance of the 'Red Tornado' from the light of the tracers, as the gun platform circles a target at night.

== See also ==
- Revolver cannon
- Gast gun
- Chain gun
- AAI In-Line
- List of multiple-barrel firearms
