= Minigun (disambiguation) =

The M134 Minigun is an American six-barrel rotary machine gun.

Minigun may also refer to:

- XM133 Minigun, an American rotary machine gun

== See also ==
- GAU-19
- Glagolev-Shipunov-Gryazev GShG-7.62
- XM214 Microgun
