= Douglas AC-47 Spooky =

American fixed-wing gunship aircraft

AC-47 Spooky
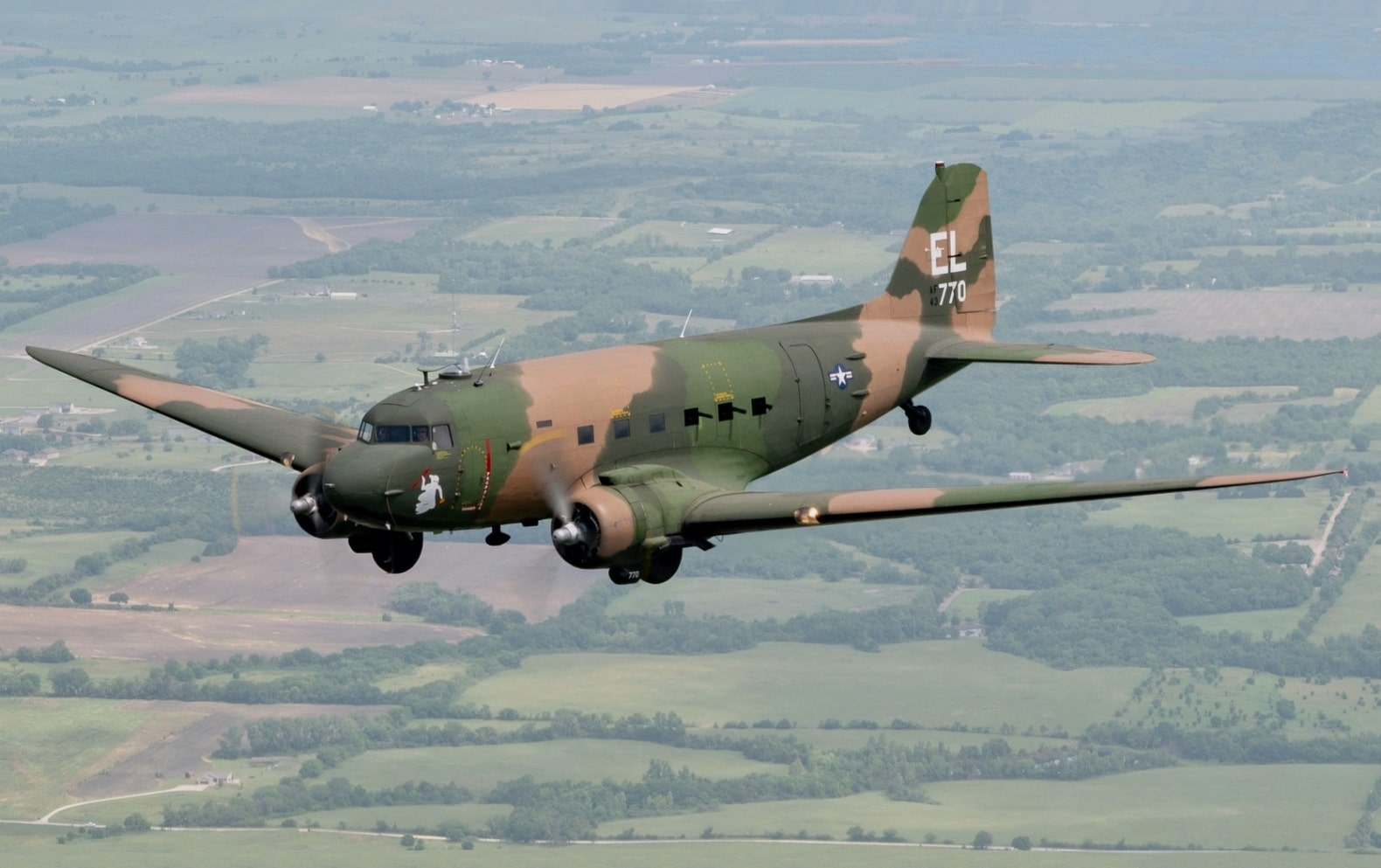
- A restored AC-47 in flight

General information
- Type: Ground-attack aircraft and close air support gunship
- Manufacturer: Douglas Aircraft Company
- Status: In service within the Colombian Aerospace Force
- Primary users: United States Air Force (former): Philippine Air Force (historical); Royal Lao Air Force (historical); Khmer Air Force (historical); Colombian Aerospace Force
- Number built: 53

History
- Manufactured: 1963–1965 (US military conversions); 1987 and 1993 (Colombian conversions)
- Introduction date: 1965
- First flight: 1964
- Developed from: C-47 Skytrain

The Douglas AC-47 Spooky (also nicknamed "Puff, the Magic Dragon") was the first in a series of fixed-wing gunships developed by the United States Air Force during the Vietnam War. It was designed to provide more firepower than light and medium ground-attack aircraft in certain situations when ground forces called for close air support.

== Design and development ==
The AC-47 was a United States Air Force (USAF) C-47 (the military version of the DC-3) that had been modified by mounting three 7.62 mm General Electric miniguns to fire through two rear window openings and the side cargo door, all on the left (pilot's) side of the aircraft, to provide close air support for ground troops. Other armament configurations could also be found on similar C-47-based aircraft around the world. The guns were actuated by a control on the pilot's yoke. The guns to be active for firing would be selected by an aerial gunner on a control panel on the right side of the cargo bay. Normally, two aerial gunners would be part of a normal crew. They would load the guns, clear malfunctions, and do inflight repair as well as select which gun(s) were online for the pilot to fire. It could orbit the target for hours, providing suppressing fire over an elliptical area about 52 yd (47.5 m) in diameter, placing a round every 2.4 yd (2.2 m) during a three-second burst. The aircraft also carried MK-24 Mod 3 parachute flares it could drop to illuminate the battleground.

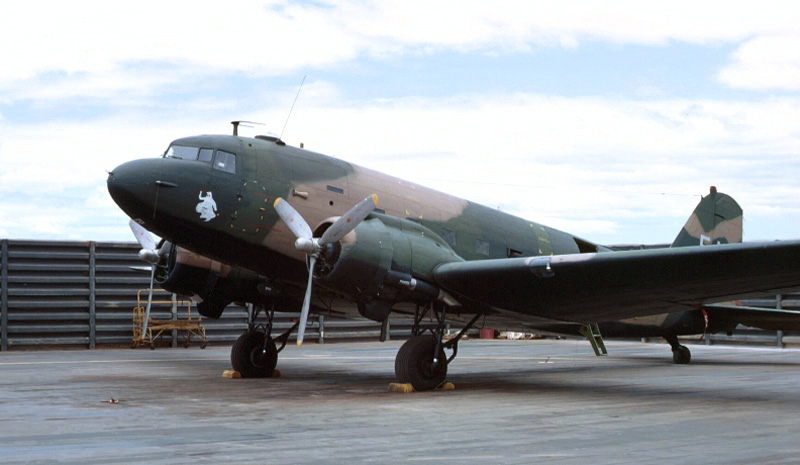
AC-47

The AC-47 had no previous design to gauge how successful it would be, because it was the first of its kind. The USAF found itself in a precarious situation when requests for additional gunships began to come in because it simply lacked miniguns to fit additional aircraft after the first two conversions. The next four aircraft were equipped with ten .30 caliber AN/M2 machine guns. These weapons, using World War II and Korean War ammunition stocks, were quickly discovered to jam easily, produce large amounts of gases from firing, and, even in ten-gun groups, provide the density of fire of only a single minigun. All four of these aircraft were retrofitted to the standard armament configuration when additional miniguns arrived.

The AC-47 initially used SUU-11/A gun pods that were installed on locally fabricated mounts for the gunship application. General Electric eventually developed the MXU-470/A to replace the gun pods, which were also used on later gunships.

== Operational history ==
=== United States Air Force ===
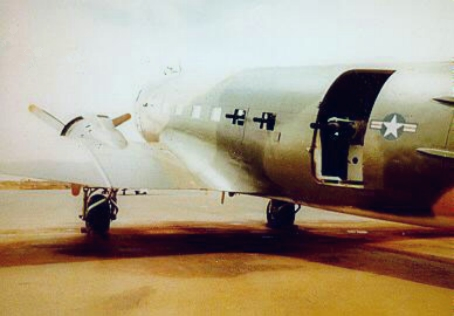
AC-47 at Nha Trang Air Base in South Vietnam

In August 1964, years of fixed-wing gunship experimentation reached a new peak with Project Tailchaser under the direction of Captain John C. Simons. This test involved the conversion of a single Convair C-131B to be capable of firing a single GAU-2/A Minigun at a downward angle out of the left side of the aircraft. Even crude grease pencil crosshairs were quickly discovered to enable a pilot flying in a pylon turn to hit a stationary area target with relative accuracy and ease. The Armament Development and Test Center tested the craft at Eglin Air Force Base, Florida, but lack of funding soon suspended the tests. In 1964, Captain Ron W. Terry returned from temporary duty in South Vietnam as part of an Air Force Systems Command team reviewing all aspects of air operations in counter-insurgency warfare, where he had noted the usefulness of C-47s and C-123s orbiting as flare ships during night attacks on fortified hamlets. He received permission to conduct a live-fire test using the C-131 and revived the side-firing gunship program.

By October, Terry's team under Project Gunship provided a C-47D, which was converted to a similar standard as the Project Tailchaser aircraft and armed with three miniguns, which were initially mounted on locally fabricated mounts—essentially strapped gun pods intended for fixed-wing aircraft (SUU-11/A) onto a mount allowing them to be fired remotely out the port side. Terry and a testing team arrived at Bien Hoa Air Base, South Vietnam, on 2 December 1964, with equipment needed to modify two C-47s. The first test aircraft (43–48579, a C-47B-5-DK mail courier converted to C-47D standard by removal of its superchargers) was ready by 11 December, the second by 15 December, and both were allocated to the 1st Air Commando Squadron for combat testing. The newly dubbed "FC-47" often operated under the radio call sign "Puff". Its primary mission involved protecting villages, hamlets, and personnel from mass attacks by Vietcong (VC) guerrilla units.

Puff's first significant success occurred on the night of 23–24 December 1964. An FC-47 arrived over the Special Forces outpost at Tranh Yend in the Mekong Delta just 37 minutes after an air support request, fired 4,500 rounds of ammunition, and broke the VC attack. The FC-47 was then called to support a second outpost at Trung Hung, about 20 miles (32 km) away. The aircraft again blunted the VC attack and forced a retreat. Between 15 and 26 December, all the FC-47's 16 combat sorties were successful. On 8 February 1965, an FC-47 flying over the Bồng Sơn area demonstrated its capabilities in the process of blunting a VC offensive. For over four hours, it fired 20,500 rounds into a VC hilltop position, killing an estimated 300 VC troops.

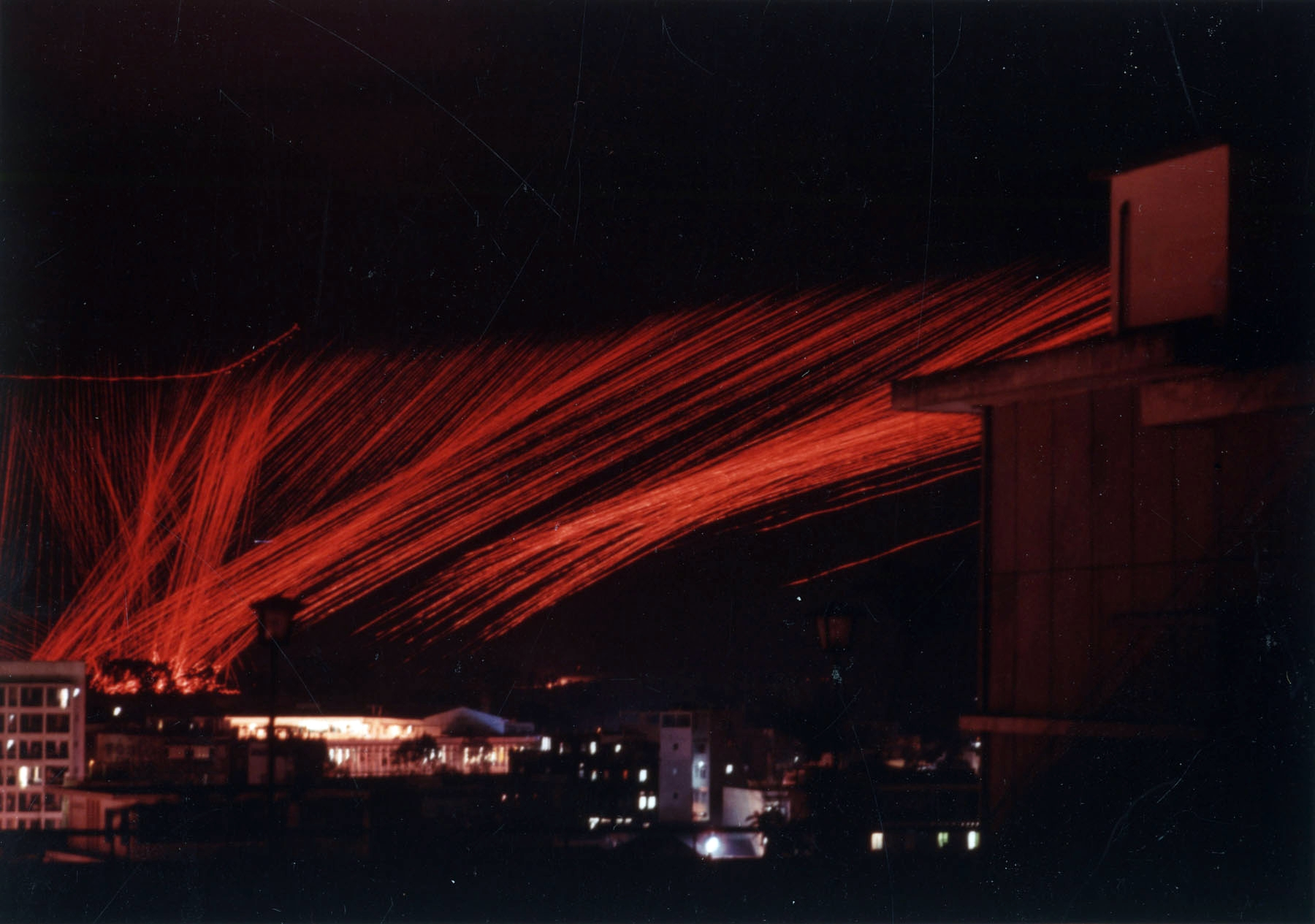
Timelapse photo showing tracer rounds visible at night while converging on the target of an AC-47D performing a pylon turn in Saigon in 1968

The early gunship trials were so successful, the second aircraft was returned to the United States early in 1965 to provide crew training. In July 1965, Headquarters USAF ordered TAC to establish an AC-47 squadron. By November 1965, a total of five aircraft were operating with the 4th Air Commando Squadron, activated in August as the first operational unit, and by the end of 1965, a total of 26 had been converted. Training Detachment 8, 1st Air Commando Wing, was subsequently established at Forbes AFB, Kansas. In Operation Big Shoot, the 4th ACS in Vietnam grew to 20 AC-47s (16 aircraft plus four reserves for attrition).

The 4th ACS deployed to Tan Son Nhut Air Base, Vietnam, on 14 November 1965. Now using the call sign Spooky, each of its three 7.62 mm miniguns could selectively fire either 50 or 100 rounds per second. Cruising in an overhead left-hand orbit at 120 knots air speed at an altitude of 3,000 feet (910 m), the gunship could put a bullet or glowing red tracer bullet (every fifth round) into every square yard of a football field-sized target in potentially less than 10 seconds. As long as its 45-flare and 24,000-round basic load of ammunition held out, it could do this intermittently while loitering over the target for hours.

In May 1966, the squadron moved north to Nha Trang Air Base to join the newly activated 14th Air Commando Wing. The 3rd Air Commando Squadron was activated at Nha Trang on 5 April 1968 as a second AC-47 squadron, with both squadrons redesignated as Special Operations Squadrons on 1 August 1968. Flights of both squadrons were stationed at bases throughout South Vietnam, and one flight of the 4th SOS served at Udorn Royal Thai Air Force Base with the 432nd Tactical Reconnaissance Wing. The work of the two AC-47 squadrons, each with 16 AC-47s flown by aircrews younger than the aircraft they flew, was undoubtedly a key contributor to the award of the Presidential Unit Citation to the 14th Air Commando Wing in June 1968.

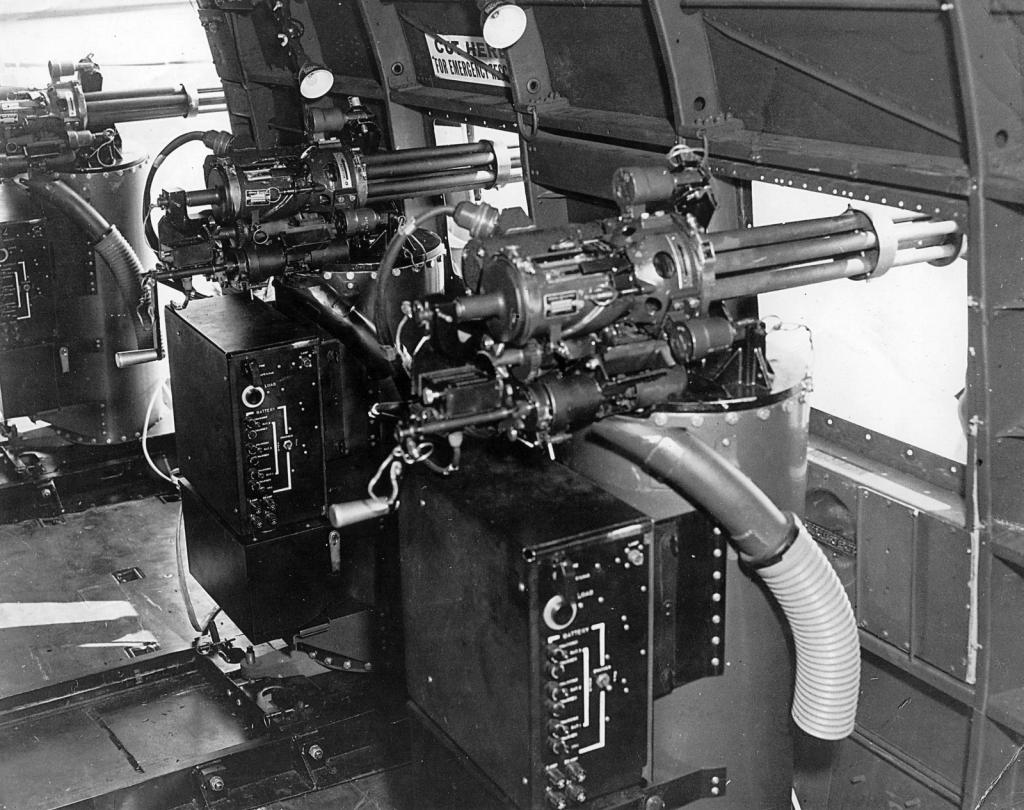
MXU-470/A minigun modules in an AC-47

One of the most publicized battles of the Vietnam War was the Battle of Khe Sanh in early 1968. More than 24,000 tactical and 2,700 B-52 strikes dropped 110,000 tons of ordnance in attacks that averaged over 300 sorties per day. During the two and a half months of combat, fighters were in the air day and night. At night, AC-47 gunships kept up constant fire against enemy troops and provided illumination for the base.

The AC-47D gunship should not be confused with a small number of C-47s that were fitted with electronic equipment in the 1950s. Prior to 1962, these aircraft were designated AC-47D. When a new designation system was adopted in 1962, these became EC-47Ds. The original gunships had been designated FC-47D by the USAF, but with protests from fighter pilots, this designation was changed to AC-47D during 1965. Of the 53 aircraft converted to AC-47 configuration, 41 served in Vietnam and 19 were lost to all causes, 12 in combat. Combat reports indicate that no village or hamlet under Spooky protection was ever lost, and a plethora of reports from civilians and military personnel were made about AC-47s coming to the rescue and saving their lives.

As the United States began Project Gunship II and Project Gunship III, many of the remaining AC-47Ds were transferred to the Republic of Vietnam Air Force, the Royal Lao Air Force, and Cambodia's Khmer Air Force, after Prince Norodom Sihanouk was deposed in a coup by General Lon Nol.

Airman First Class John L. Levitow, an AC-47 loadmaster with the 3rd SOS, received the Medal of Honor for saving his aircraft, Spooky 71, from destruction on 24 February 1969 during a fire-support mission at Long Binh. The aircraft was struck by an 82-mm mortar round that inflicted 3,500 shrapnel holes, wounding Levitow 40 times, but he used his body to jettison an armed magnesium flare, which ignited shortly after Levitow ejected it from the aircraft, allowing the AC-47 to return to base.

=== Other air forces ===
By the end of 1969 most AC-47Ds were transferred to the Republic of Vietnam Air Force. The RVNAF kept using them until 1975 when most of them were destroyed or captured by North Vietnam at the end of the war.

In 1969, Laos received its first AC-47 armed with SUU-11/A minigun pods. These pods ended up being unsatisfactory so later RLAF AC-47s were equipped with .50 cal machine guns or the MXU-470/A minigun modules.

The Khmer Air Force received some AC-47Ds from the USAF between 1973 and 1974 and also converted some with .50 cal machine guns. Several of them were given to Thailand after the end of the Cambodian Civil War.

In December 1984 and January 1985, the United States supplied two AC-47D gunships to the Salvadoran Air Force (FAS) and trained aircrews to operate the system. The AC-47 gunship carried three .50 cal machine guns and could loiter and provide heavy firepower for army operations. As the FAS had long operated C-47s, training pilots and crew to operate the aircraft as a weapons platform was easy for the United States. By all accounts, the AC-47 soon became probably the most effective weapon in the FAS arsenal.

In 2006, Colombia started operating five armed Basler BT-67 (Colombian Air Force designation : AC-47T), known by civilians as avion fantasma (ghost plane), on counter-insurgency operations in conjunction with Sikorsky AH-60 Arpia armed helicopters and Cessna A-37 Dragonflys against local illegally armed groups. The BT-67s are armed with .50 cal (12.7 mm) GAU-19/A machine guns slaved to a forward looking infrared system. They also have the ability to carry bombs. At least one has been seen fitted with one GAU-19/A and a 20 mm cannon, most likely a French-made M621. The BT-67s are C-47/DC-3s modified by the Basler Corporation of Oshkosh, Wisconsin, and are not variants of the Douglas AC-47.

In 1970, the Indonesian Air Force converted a former civilian DC-3. The converted aircraft was armed with three .50 cal machine guns. During 1975, the Indonesian Air Force used its "AC-47" in the Indonesian invasion of East Timor to attack the city of Dili. Later, the aircraft was used in Indonesian military close air support missions in East Timor. Its retirement date is unknown.

South Africa converted some C-47s to gunships by installing gun mounts on a rotating platform on the rear of the aircraft and used them similarly to a helicopter gunner. South African "Dragon Daks" were known to fit 20 mm cannons

Between 1980 and 1981 Uruguay converted C-47 T-508 into a gunship for COIN missions by installing three .50 cal machine guns to the last two rear windows.

The Philippines also converted some C-47s by mounting .50 cal machine guns and used them against Muslim guerrillas in the Battle of Jolo in 1974

In 1967, Thailand converted its first AC-47D installing it the SUU-11/A minigun pods. It kept converting a few more airframes and also received some former Khmer Air Force AC-47Ds from Cambodia in late 1975. Thai AC-47s also were equipped with a combination of two .50 cal machine guns and an M197 20mm Electric cannon.

== Variants ==
FC-47
Early version with 10 .30 cal machine guns (later replaced by minigun modules)
AC-47D
US conversion of C-47 with M134 7.62-mm minigun
AC-47T
Colombian military conversion of civilian DC-3 by Basler Turbo with infrared sensor pod with upgrade PT-6A engines and GAU-19 .50 caliber triple Gatling guns (replacing .50 cal machine guns)
AC-47
With 3 AN-M2 .50 cal machine guns (used by most operators)
B.JL.2
(Thai: บ.จล.๒) Thai variant with 2 .50 cal machine guns and an M197 20mm Electric cannon.
AC-47TP
Salvadorian BT-67 conversion with 3 .50 cal machine guns

== Operators ==
=== Current ===
Colombia

- Colombian Aerospace Force
  - 214th Tactical Air Support Squadron

=== Former ===
Cambodia
Khmer Air Force
Kingdom of Laos
Royal Lao Air Force
South Vietnam
Republic of Vietnam Air Force
El Salvador
Salvadoran Air Force
Thailand
Royal Thai Air Force
Philippines
Philippine Air Force
Indonesia
Indonesian Air Force
South Africa
South African Air Force
Uruguay
Uruguayan Air Force
United States

United States Air Force – Tactical Air Command

14th Special Operations Wing – Nha Trang Air Base, Vietnam (detachments at Danang, Pleiku, Bien Hoa and Binh Thuy)
3rd Air Commando Squadron 1968–69
4th Air Commando Squadron 1964–69

== Aircraft on display ==
Aircraft painted to represent AC-47s are on static display at the Air Commando Park at Hurlburt Field and the Air Force Armament Museum at Eglin Air Force Base. These airframes never were AC-47s and were actually regular unarmed C-47s.

== Specifications (AC-47D) ==
Data from

General characteristics

- Crew: 7: pilot, copilot, navigator, flight engineer, loadmaster and 2 gunners
- Length: 64 ft 5 in (19.63 m)
- Wingspan: 95 ft 0 in (28.96 m)
- Height: 16 ft 11 in (5.16 m)
- Wing area: 987 sq ft (91.7 m^{2})
- Empty weight: 18,080 lb (8,201 kg)
- Gross weight: 33,000 lb (14,969 kg)
- Powerplant: 2 × Pratt & Whitney R-1830 Twin Wasp 14-cylinder air-cooled radial piston engines, 1,200 hp (890 kW) each

Performance

- Maximum speed: 230 mph (370 km/h, 200 kn)
- Cruise speed: 175 mph (282 km/h, 152 kn)
- Range: 2,175 mi (3,500 km, 1,890 nmi)
- Service ceiling: 24,450 ft (7,450 m)
- Wing loading: 33.4 lb/sq ft (163 kg/m^{2})
- Power/mass: 0.15 hp/lb (0.25 kW/kg)

Armament

- Guns:
  - 3 × 7.62 mm General Electric GAU-2/M134 miniguns, 2,000 rpm or
  - 10 × .30 in Browning AN/M2 machine guns
  - 32 × Mk 24 flares

== See also ==
- Pylon turn

Related development

- Douglas C-47 Skytrain
- Douglas DC-3

Aircraft of comparable role, configuration, and era

- Fairchild AC-119
- Lockheed AC-130

Related lists

- List of attack aircraft
- List of military aircraft of the United States
- List of United States attack aircraft
