= Dillon Aero =

American firearms manufacturer

Dillon Aero, Inc. is an armament manufacturer in Scottsdale, Arizona, United States. It is owned by the Dillon family, who also own Dillon Precision, a manufacturer of reloading presses and other reloading equipment, as well as Dillon Optics, a sunglasses manufacturer.

== Minigun ==
Dillon Aero manufactures the Air Force GAU-2B/A (Army M134) 7.62×51mm minigun, which is used primarily by 160th SOAR. The company completely redesigned the weapon and significantly improved its reliability while reducing its weight.
