= GAU-19 =

Electrically-driven heavy machine gun

GAU-19/B
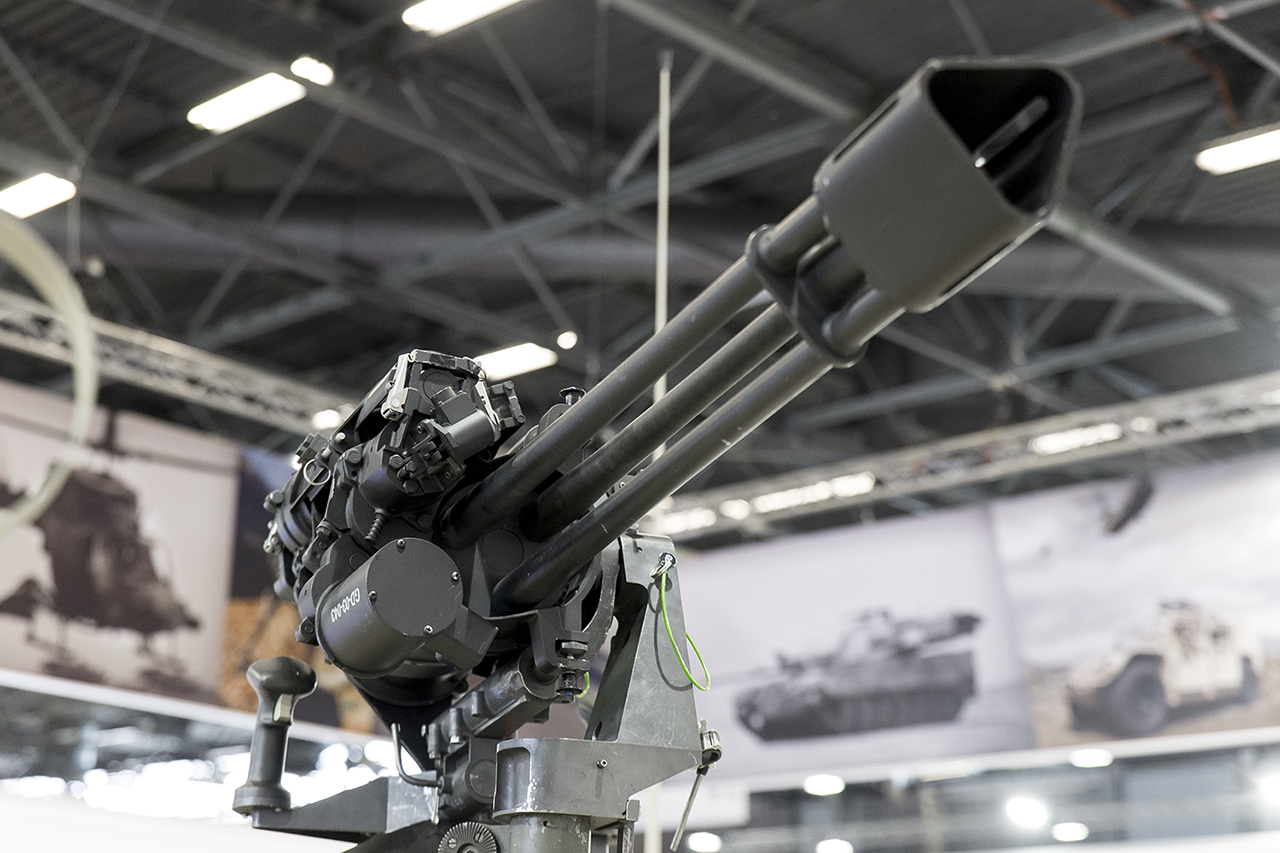
- Type: Rotary heavy machine gun
- Place of origin: United States

Service history
- Used by: See History

Production history
- Designer: General Electric
- Manufacturer: Fulcrum Concepts
- Produced: GAU-19/A: 1983–present GAU-19/B: 2012–present
- Variants: 3-barrel or 6-barrel

Specifications
- Mass: GAU-19/A:138 lbs. (63kg) GAU-19/B:106 lbs. (48kg)
- Length: 53.9 in. (1,369 mm)
- Barrel length: 36 in. (914 mm)
- Width: 13.5 in. (343 mm)
- Height: 15 in. (381 mm)
- Cartridge: .50 BMG (12.7×99mm NATO)
- Barrels: 3 or 6
- Action: Electric
- Rate of fire: 1,000, 1,300 or 2,000 rounds per minute
- Muzzle velocity: 2,910 fps (887 m/s)
- Effective firing range: 1,800 m
- Maximum firing range: 6,000 m
- Feed system: linkless or M9 linked belt

The GAU-19/A (GECAL 50) is an electrically driven, three-barrel rotary heavy machine gun that fires the .50 BMG (12.7×99mm NATO) cartridge.

== Technical specifications ==
The GAU-19/A is designed to accept standard NATO .50 caliber M9-linked ammunition. The rate of fire is selectable to be either 1,000 or 2,000 rounds per minute. The Humvee armament kit version fires at 1,300 rounds per minute. The average recoil force when firing is 382 lb/ft, 495 lb/ft or 629 lb/ft depending on firing rate. In January 2012, General Dynamics announced they would be delivering a new version designated GAU-19/B. It provides the same firepower in a lighter platform, weighing 48 kilograms (106 lb) and optimized for a firing rate of 1,300 rounds per minute and an average recoil force of 562 lb/ft. Both variants can be configured for an ammunition capacity of 500–1,200 rounds. Both variants are reliable to 40,000 mean rounds between failure.

== History ==
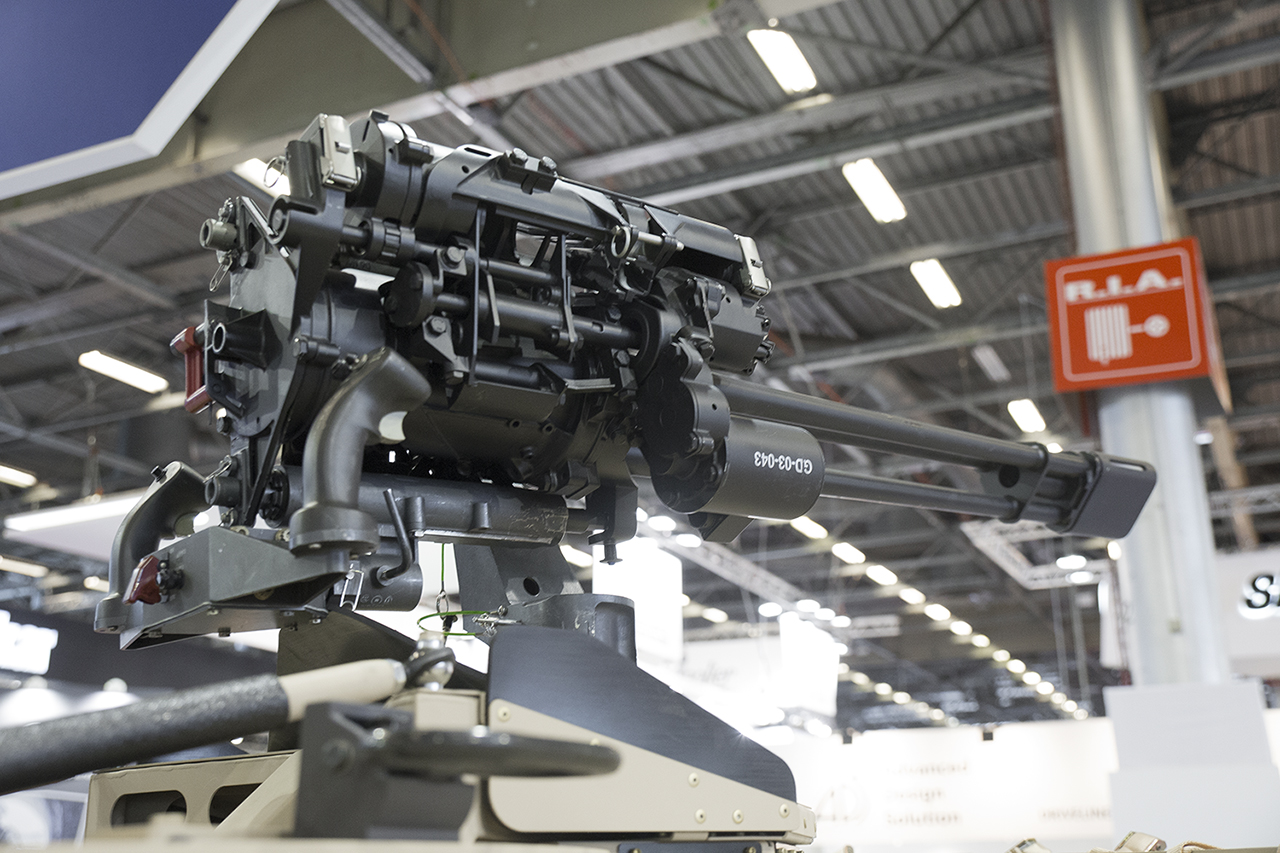
GAU-19/B mounted. Eurosatory Paris, 2016.

The GECAL 50 was first manufactured by General Electric, then by Lockheed Martin, and now by General Dynamics. Design work began in 1982. Early prototypes had six barrels, but a three-barreled configuration is now standard. The GAU-19/A was originally designed as a larger, more potent version of the M134 Minigun. Due to the loss of nine helicopters in Grenada, GE started building prototypes of the weapon in both a three-barreled and a six-barreled configuration. The six-barreled version was designed to fire 4,000 rounds per minute, and could be adapted to fire up to 8,000 rounds per minute. The GAU-19 takes 0.4 seconds to reach maximum firing rate. Soon it was recommended as a potential armament for the V-22 Osprey. The magazine would be located underneath the cabin floor and could be reloaded in-flight. However, plans to mount the gun were later dropped. In December 1992 the US Navy issued a letter of qualification for GAU-19/A integration and use on naval aircraft. In 2005, the GAU-19/A was approved to be mounted on the OH-58D Kiowa helicopter. It also could have been used on the Army's now cancelled ARH-70.

In 1999, the United States sent 28 GAU-19s to Colombia. Oman is known to use the GAU-19/A mounted on their HMMWVs. The Mexican Navy uses MDH MD-902 series helicopters with the GAU-19/A system mounted for anti-narcotics operations.

In October 2010 General Dynamics began developing the lighter weight GAU-19/B in response to an urgent needs statement issued by the Armed Scout Helicopter Program Office. By April 2011 flight testing had begun and by January 2012, the U.S. Army ordered 30 GAU-19/B versions for use on helicopters. All were delivered by the next month. In August 2012 the GAU-19/B received a safety confirmation from the US Army Evaluation Center for use on the OH-58D Kiowa Warrior.

Both GAU-19 variants have been integrated on naval vessels (tripod and remote weapons station), vehicles (turret and remotely operated), and on both rotary and fixed wing aircraft (externally mounted under wing fixed forward and man fired from the aircraft door or cargo ramp). Most recently a self-contained gun pod was developed by Fulcrum Concepts LLC.

== Users ==
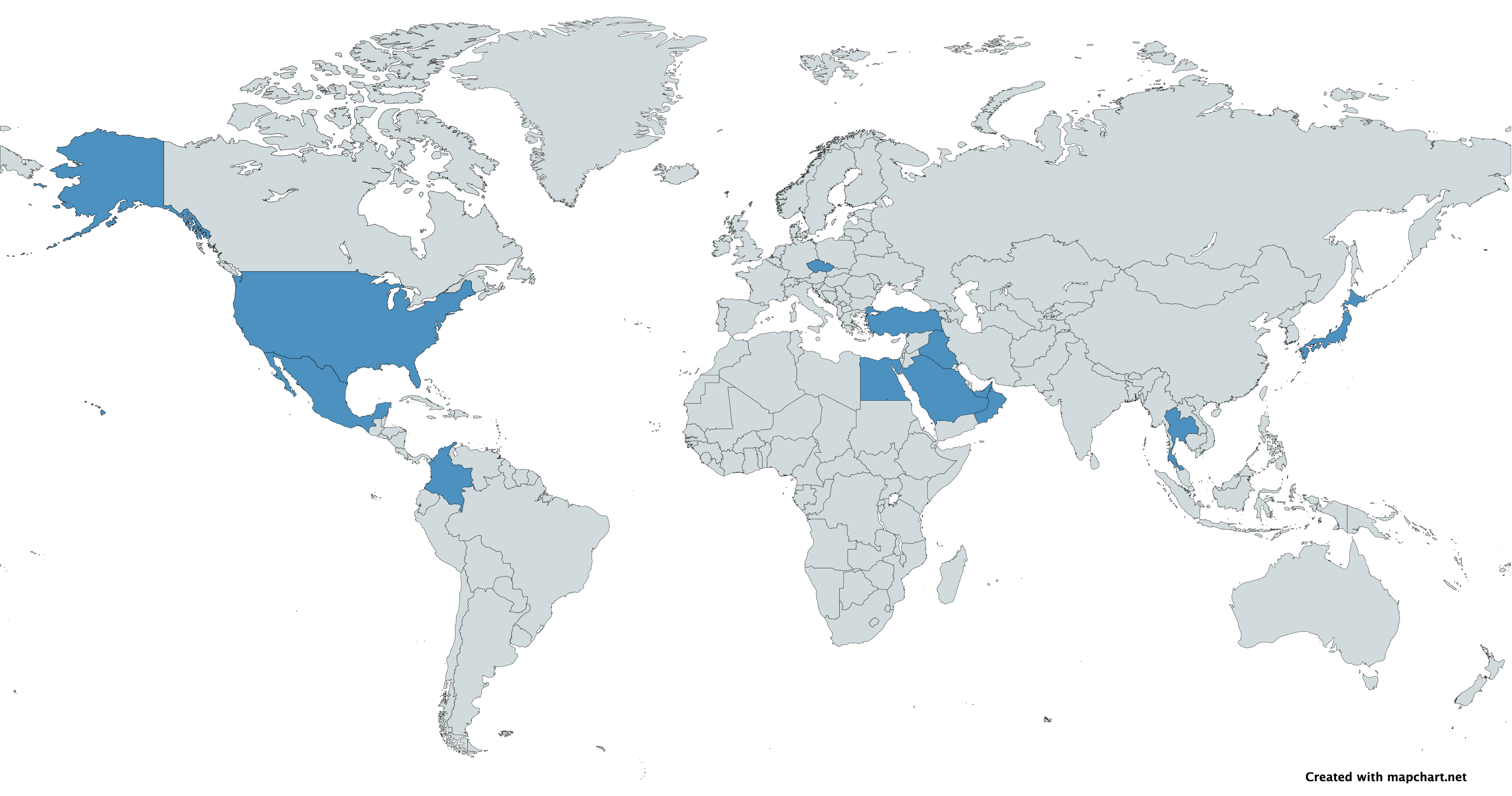
Map with GAU-19 users in blue

- Colombia: Used by Drug Enforcement troops, and the Colombian National Police, AH-60L ARPIA III/IV COIN attack helicopter, AC-47T CAS gunship
- Czechia: 12 GAU-19B
- Egypt
- Iraq
- Japan: Used by Japan Coast Guard, on PC Kagayuki class
- Mexico: Used by the Mexican Air Force and the Mexican Navy on Humvees, UH-60 Black Hawks, and the MD Explorer
- Oman: Used on Army HMMWV.
- Saudi Arabia: Used on AH6i
- Thailand: 4 GAU-19/B for use on AH6i
- Turkey
- UAE: Used on S70M Blackhawks, Bell 407, naval vessels and HMMWVs.
- United States

== See also ==
- M61 Vulcan – 20 mm Gatling-type rotary cannon
- M134 Minigun – American rotary machine gun
- XM214 Microgun – American prototype 5.56 mm rotary-barreled machine gun
- M197 electric cannon – 20 mm Gatling-type rotary cannon
- GAU-12 Equalizer – 25 mm rotary aircraft autocannon
- GAU-8 Avenger – American 30mm autocannon (since 1977)
- Yakushev-Borzov YakB-12.7mm machine gun
- List of multiple-barrel firearms
