= M134 Minigun =

American rotary machine gun

Machine Gun, High Rate, Caliber 7.62-mm, M134
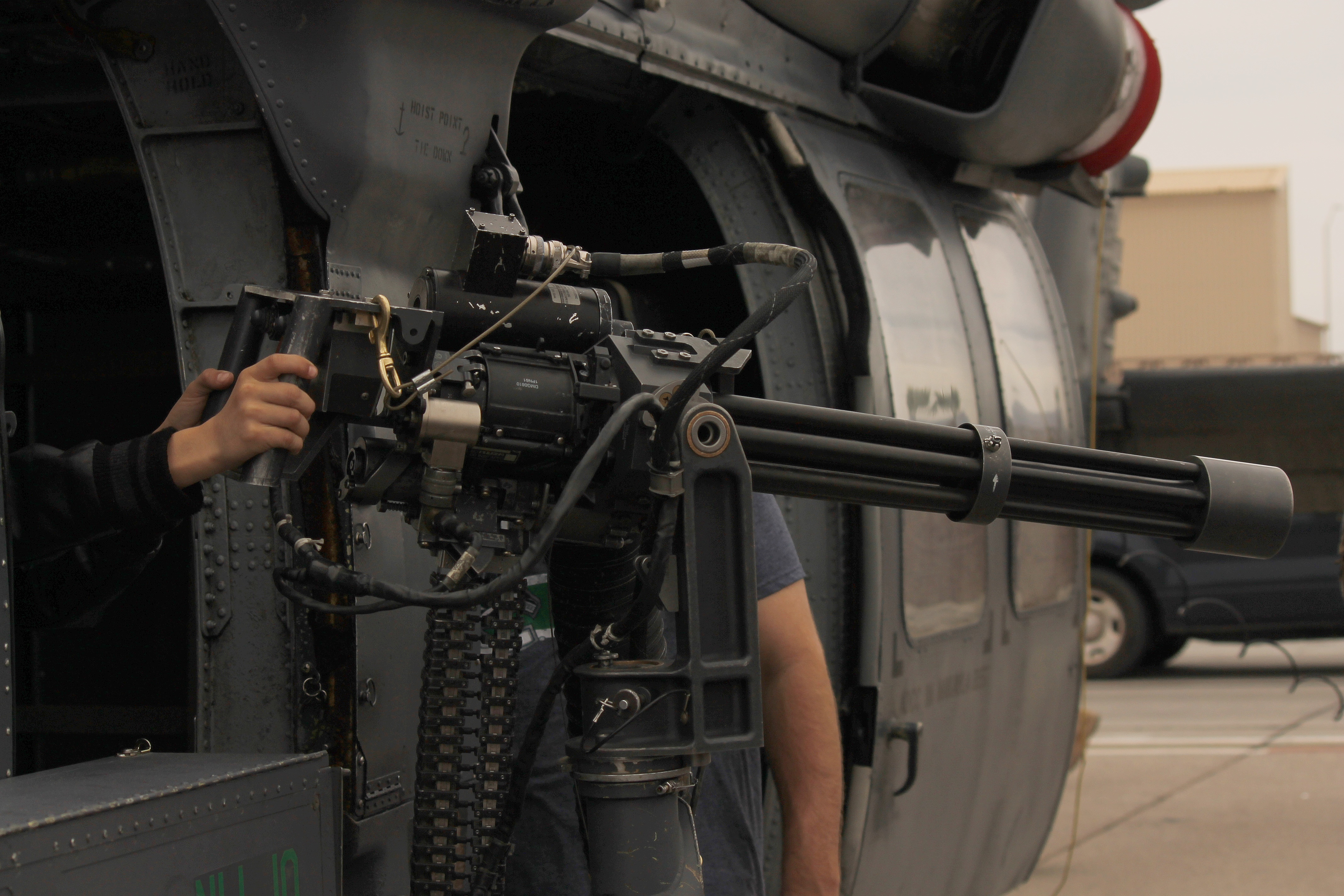
- Mounted on a Sikorsky HH-60G Pave Hawk helicopter
- Type: Rotary medium machine gun
- Place of origin: United States

Service history
- In service: 1963–present
- Used by: See Users
- Wars: Vietnam War; Third Indochina War; United States invasion of Grenada; United States invasion of Panama; Soviet–Afghan War; Falklands War; Gulf War; Operation Restore Hope; War in Afghanistan (2001–2021); Iraq War

Production history
- Designer: General Electric
- Designed: 1960
- Manufacturer: General Electric; Dillon Aero; Garwood Industries; Profense
- Produced: 1962–present
- Variants: See Design and variants

Specifications
- Mass: 85 lb (39 kg), 41 lb (19 kg) lightweight mod.
- Length: 801.6 mm (31.56 in)
- Barrel length: 558.8 mm (22.00 in)
- Cartridge: 7.62×51mm NATO
- Barrels: 6
- Action: Electrically driven rotary breech
- Rate of fire: Variable, 2,000–6,000 rounds/min
- Muzzle velocity: 2,800 ft/s (853 m/s)
- Maximum firing range: 3,280 ft (1,000 m; 1,090 yd)
- Feed system: Disintegrating M13 linked belt or linkless feed; dependent on installation (500–5,000-round belt)
- Sights: Dependent on installation; no fixed sights

The M134 Minigun is an American 7.62×51mm NATO six-barrel rotary machine gun with a high rate of fire (2,000 to 6,000 rounds per minute). It features a rotary barrel assembly with an external power source, normally an electric motor. The "Mini" in the name is in comparison to larger-caliber designs that use a rotary barrel design, such as General Electric's earlier 20 mm M61 Vulcan, and "gun" for the use of rifle ammunition as opposed to autocannon shells.

"Minigun" refers to a specific model of weapon that General Electric originally produced, but the term "minigun" has popularly come to refer to any externally powered rotary gun of rifle caliber. The term is sometimes used loosely to refer to guns of similar rates of fire and configuration, regardless of power source and caliber.

The Minigun is used by several branches of the U.S. military. Versions are designated M134 and XM196 by the United States Army, and GAU-2/A and GAU-17/A by the U.S. Air Force and U.S. Navy.

== History ==
=== Background: electrically driven Gatling gun ===
The ancestor to the modern minigun was the hand cranked mechanical Gatling gun invented in the 1860s by Richard Jordan Gatling. He later replaced the hand-cranked mechanism with an electric motor, a relatively new invention at the time. Even after Gatling slowed the mechanism, the new electrically powered Gatling gun had a theoretical rate of fire of 3,000 rounds per minute, roughly three times the rate of a typical modern, single-barreled machine gun. Gatling's design received U.S. Patent #502,185 on July 25, 1893. Despite his improvements, the Gatling gun fell into disuse after cheaper, lighter-weight, recoil and gas operated machine guns were invented; Gatling himself went bankrupt for a period.

During World War I, several German companies were working on externally powered guns for use in aircraft. One of these designs was the Fokker-Leimberger, an externally powered 12-barrel rotary gun using the 7.92×57mm Mauser round; it was claimed to be capable of firing over 7,000 rpm, but suffered from frequent cartridge-case ruptures due to its "nutcracker" rotary split-breech design, which is different from that of conventional rotary gun designs. None of these German guns went into production during the war, although a competing Siemens prototype (possibly using a different action), which was tried on the Western Front, scored a victory in aerial combat. The British also experimented with this type of split-breech during the 1950s, but they were also unsuccessful.

=== Minigun: 1960s–Vietnam ===
In the 1960s, the United States Armed Forces began exploring modern variants of the electrically powered, rotating barrel Gatling-style weapons for use in the Vietnam War. American forces in the Vietnam War, which used helicopters as one of the primary means of transporting soldiers and equipment through the dense jungle, found that their helicopters were vulnerable to small arms fire and rocket-propelled grenade (RPG) attacks when they slowed to land. Although helicopters had mounted single-barrel machine guns, using them to repel attackers hidden in the dense jungle foliage often led to overheated barrels or cartridge jams.

To develop a more reliable weapon with a higher rate of fire, General Electric designers scaled down the rotary-barrel 20 mm M61 Vulcan cannon for 7.62×51mm NATO ammunition. The resulting weapon, designated M134 and known as the "Minigun", could fire up to 6,000 rounds per minute without overheating. The gun has a variable (i.e. selectable) rate of fire, specified to fire at rates of up to 6,000 rpm with most applications set at rates between 3,000 and 4,000 rounds per minute.

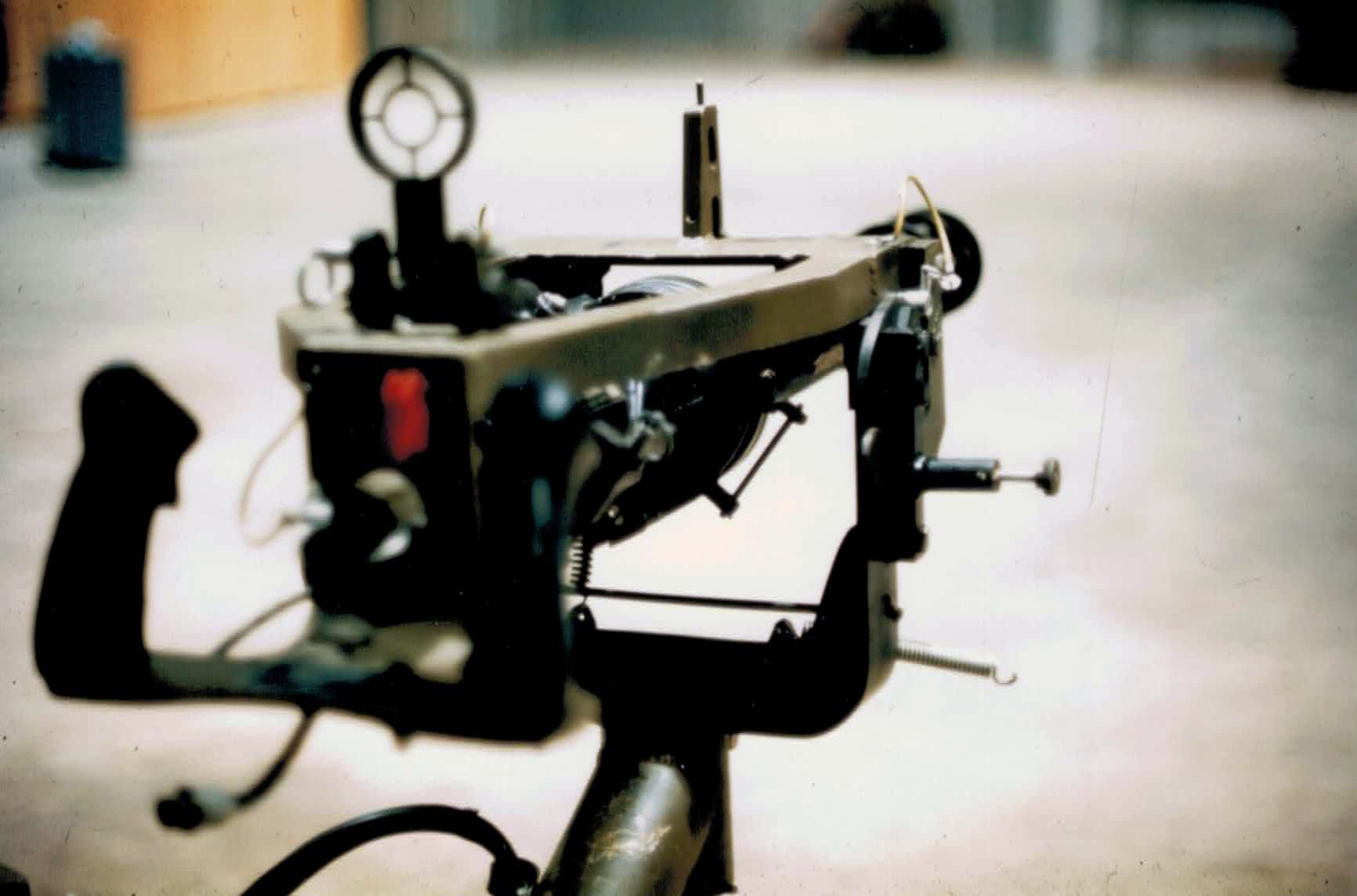
View of M134 from inside a UH-1 Huey, Nha Trang AB, 1967

The Minigun was mounted on Hughes OH-6 Cayuse and Bell OH-58 Kiowa side pods; in the turret and on pylon pods of Bell AH-1 Cobra attack helicopters; and on door, pylon and pod mounts on Bell UH-1 Iroquois transport helicopters. Several larger aircraft were outfitted with miniguns specifically for close air support: the Cessna A-37 Dragonfly with an internal gun and with pods on wing hardpoints; and the Douglas A-1 Skyraider, also with pods on wing hardpoints. Other famous gunship airplanes are the Douglas AC-47 Spooky, the Fairchild AC-119, and the Lockheed AC-130.

=== Dillon Aero minigun ===
The U.S. government had procured some 10,000 Miniguns during the Vietnam War. Around 1990, Dillon Aero acquired a large number of Miniguns and spares from "a foreign user". The guns kept failing to shoot continuously, revealing that they were actually worn-out weapons. The company decided to fix the problems encountered, rather than simply putting the guns into storage. Fixing failure problems ended up improving the Minigun's overall design. Word of Dillon's efforts to improve the Minigun reached the 160th SOAR, and the company was invited to Fort Campbell, Kentucky, to demonstrate its products. A delinker, used to separate cartridges from ammunition belts and feed them into the gun housing, and other parts were tested on Campbell's ranges. The 160th SOAR were impressed by the delinker's performance and began ordering them by 1997. This prompted Dillon to improve other design aspects including the bolt, housing and barrel. From 1997 to 2001, Dillon Aero manufactured 25–30 products per year. In 2001, it was working on a new bolt design that increased performance and service life. By 2002, virtually every component of the minigun had been improved, so Dillon began producing complete weapons with improved components. The guns were purchased quickly by the 160th SOAR as its standardized weapon system. The gun then went through the Army's formal procurement system approval process, and in 2003 the Dillon Aero minigun was certified and designated M134D. Once the Dillon Aero system was approved for general military service, Dillon Aero GAU-17s entered Marine Corps service and were well received in replacing GE's GAU-17s serving on Marine UH-1s.

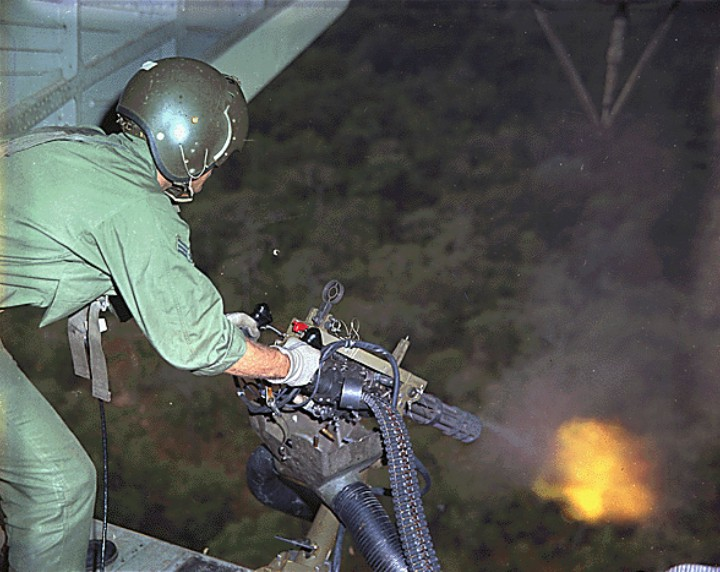
A U.S. Air Force rotary-wing crewman fires a minigun during the Vietnam War.

The core of the M134D was a steel housing and rotor. To focus on weight reduction, a titanium housing and rotor were introduced, creating the M134D-T which had reduced weight from 62 lb (28 kg) to 41 lb (19 kg). The gun housing had a 500,000-round lifespan before it wore out, which was far higher than a conventional machine gun's 40,000-round lifespan but lower than that of other rotary guns. A hybrid of the two weapons resulted in the M134D-H, which had a steel housing and titanium rotor. It was cheaper with the steel component and only 1 lb (0.45 kg) heavier than the M134D-T, and restored its lifespan to 1.5 million rounds. The M134D-H is currently in use on various 160th Regiment platforms.

Dillon also created specialized mounts and ammunition-handling systems. Initially, mounts were made only for aviation systems. Then from 2003 to 2005, the Navy began mounting Dillon miniguns on specialized small boats. In 2005, the Naval Surface Warfare Center Crane Division procured guns to mount on Humvees. In Iraq, US Army Special Forces units on the ground were frequently engaged by opposition forces, so they mounted M134D miniguns on their vehicles for additional firepower. After several engagements the attackers seemed to avoid vehicles with miniguns. Later, the Special Forces units began concealing their weapons so opposition troops would not know they were facing the weapon; the regular Army units did the opposite, creating minigun mock-ups out of painted PVC pipes tied together to resemble barrels to intimidate enemies.

=== Garwood Industries minigun ===
Garwood Industries created the M134G version with several modifications to the original GE system. The optimum rate of fire was determined by Garwood to be around 3,200 rounds per minute (rpm). The M134G is being produced with this firing rate as well as 4,000 rpm and the previous standard 3,000 rpm rate. Garwood Industries made several other modifications to the 1960s Minigun design in order to meet modern-day military and ISO standards. This includes modifications to the drive motor, feeder and barrel clutch assembly.

From 2015 to 2017 Garwood Industries CEO Tracy Garwood collaborated with firearms dealer Michael Fox and weapons smuggler Tyler Carlson to supply miniguns to Mexican drug cartels. Garwood submitted false paperwork to the ATF claiming that some M134G rotor housings had been destroyed when they were actually sold to the gun-running ring. In 2017 federal agents raided Fox's home and recovered two of the rotor housings that Garwood had reported destroyed. A number of the rotor housings were shipped to Mexico and a completed M134G using a reportedly destroyed rotor housing was recovered from a cartel by Mexican law enforcement. Garwood claimed he did not know that the intended buyers were Mexican cartels although he was aware that they were to be used for illegal activity.

== Design and variants ==
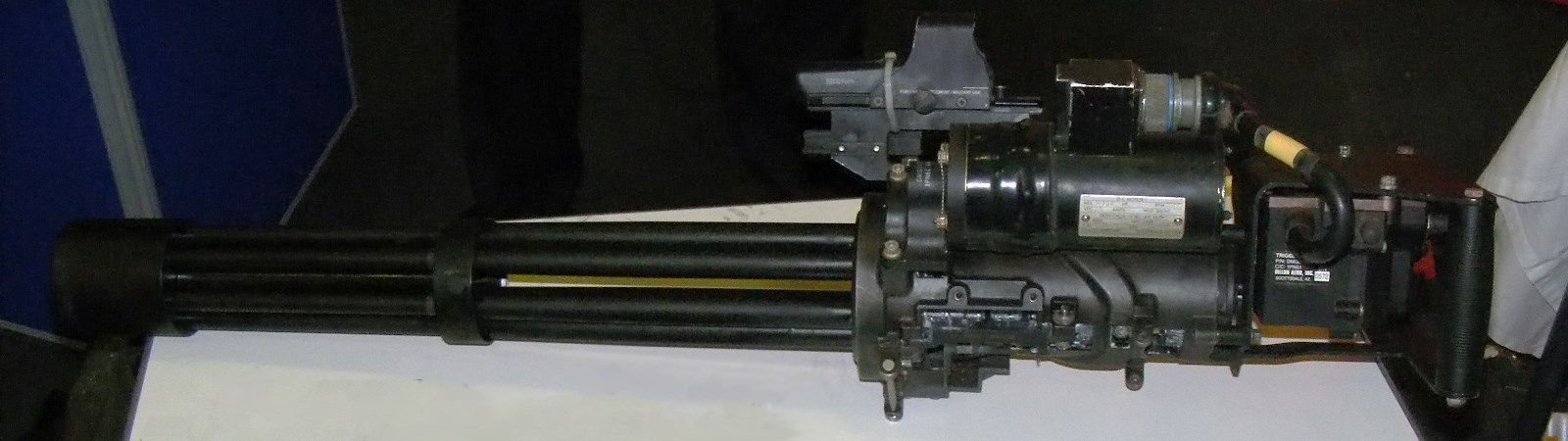
A Royal Navy minigun, separated from mounting and ammunition

The basic minigun is a six-barrel, air-cooled, and electrically driven rotary machine gun. The electric drive rotates the weapon within its housing, with a rotating firing pin assembly and rotary chamber. The minigun's multi-barrel design helps prevent overheating, but also serves other functions. Multiple barrels allow for a greater capacity for a high firing rate, since the serial process of firing, extraction, and loading is taking place in all barrels simultaneously. Thus, as one barrel fires, two others are in different stages of shell extraction and another three are being loaded. The minigun is composed of multiple closed-bolt rifle barrels arranged in a circular housing. The barrels are rotated by an external power source, usually electric, pneumatic, or hydraulic. Other rotating-barrel cannons are powered by the gas pressure or recoil energy of fired cartridges. A gas-operated variant, designated XM133, was also developed, but was not put into production. It was to be nearly identical to the M134 but with ports that aligned with the piston drive in the center of the barrel cluster.

While the weapon can feed from linked ammunition, it requires a delinking feeder to strip the links as the rounds are fed into the chambers. The original feeder unit was designated MAU-56/A, but has since been replaced by an improved MAU-201/A unit.

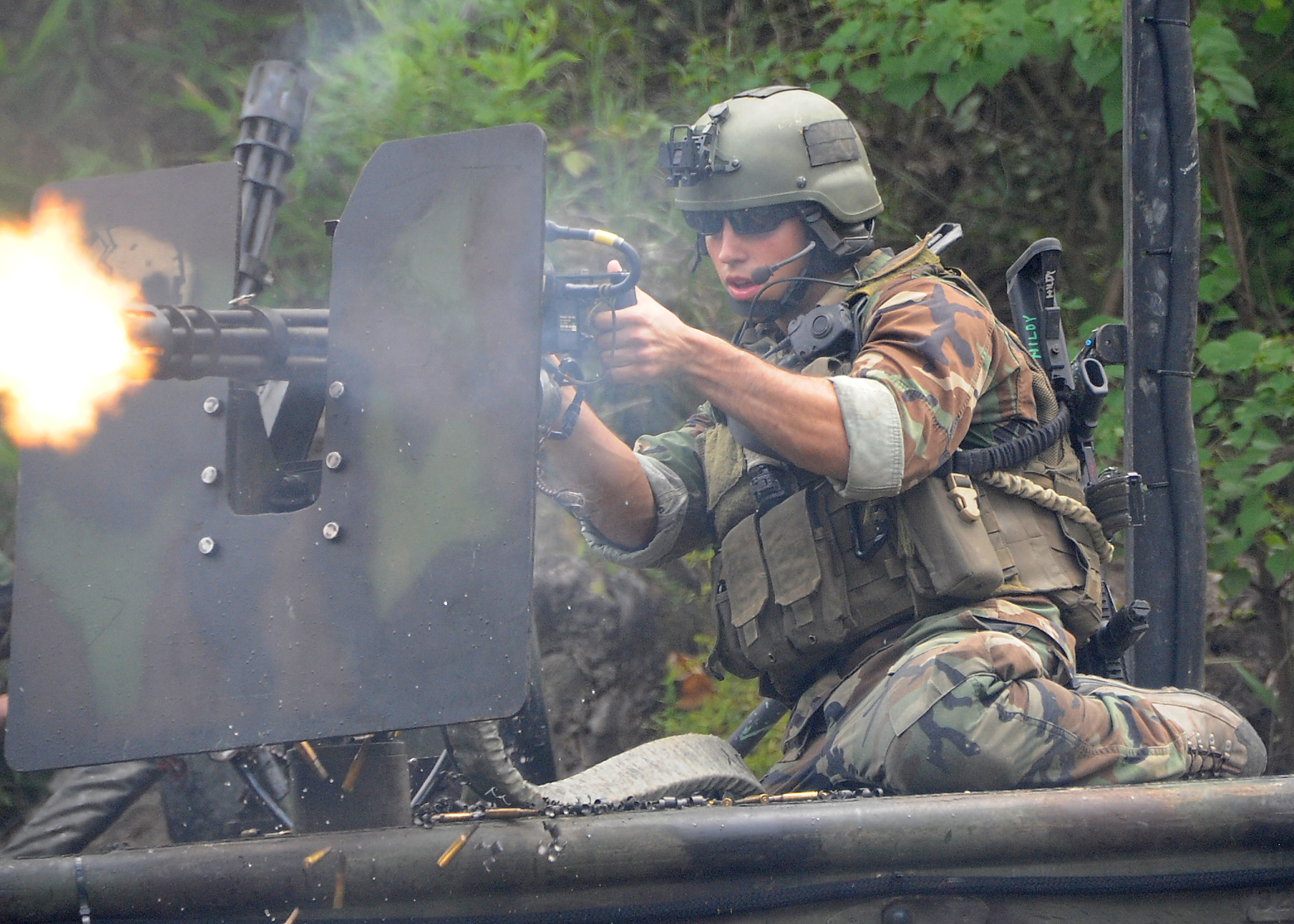
A U.S. Navy Special Warfare Combatant-craft Crewman (SWCC) on a SOC-R firing a Minigun at Stennis Space Center in Mississippi, August 2009.

The General Electric minigun is used in several branches of the U.S. military, under a number of designations. The basic fixed armament version was given the designation M134 by the United States Army, while the same weapon was designated GAU-2/A (on a fixed mount) and GAU-17/A (flexible mount) by the United States Air Force (USAF) and United States Navy (USN). The USAF minigun variant has three versions, while the US Army weapon appears to have incorporated several improvements without a change in designation. The M134D is an improved version of the M134 designed and manufactured by Dillon Aero, while Garwood Industries manufactures the M134G variant. Available sources show a relation between both M134 and GAU-2/A and M134 and GAU-2B/A. A separate variant, designated XM196, with an added ejection sprocket was developed specifically for the XM53 Armament Subsystem on the Lockheed AH-56 Cheyenne helicopter.

Another variant was developed by the USAF specifically for flexible installations, beginning primarily with the Bell UH-1N Twin Huey helicopter, as the GAU-17/A. Produced by General Dynamics, this version has a slotted flash hider. The primary end users of the GAU-17/A have been the USN and the United States Marine Corps (USMC), which mount the gun as defensive armament on a number of helicopters and surface ships. GAU-17/As from helicopters were rushed into service for ships on pintle mountings taken from Mk16 20 mm guns for anti-swarm protection in the Gulf ahead of the 2003 Iraq War - 59 systems were installed in 30 days. The GAU-17/A is designated Mk 44 in the machine gun series and is generally known as the Mk 44 when installed on British warships.

The weapon is part of both the A/A49E-11 armament system on the UH-1N; and of the A/A49E-13 armament subsystem on the USAF Sikorsky HH-60H Pave Hawk helicopter. The weapons on these systems feature a selectable fire rate of either 2,000 or 4,000 rpm. There is mention of a possible GAUSE-17 designation (GAU-Shipboard Equipment-17), in reference to the system when mounted on surface ships, though this would not follow the official ASETDS designation system's format.

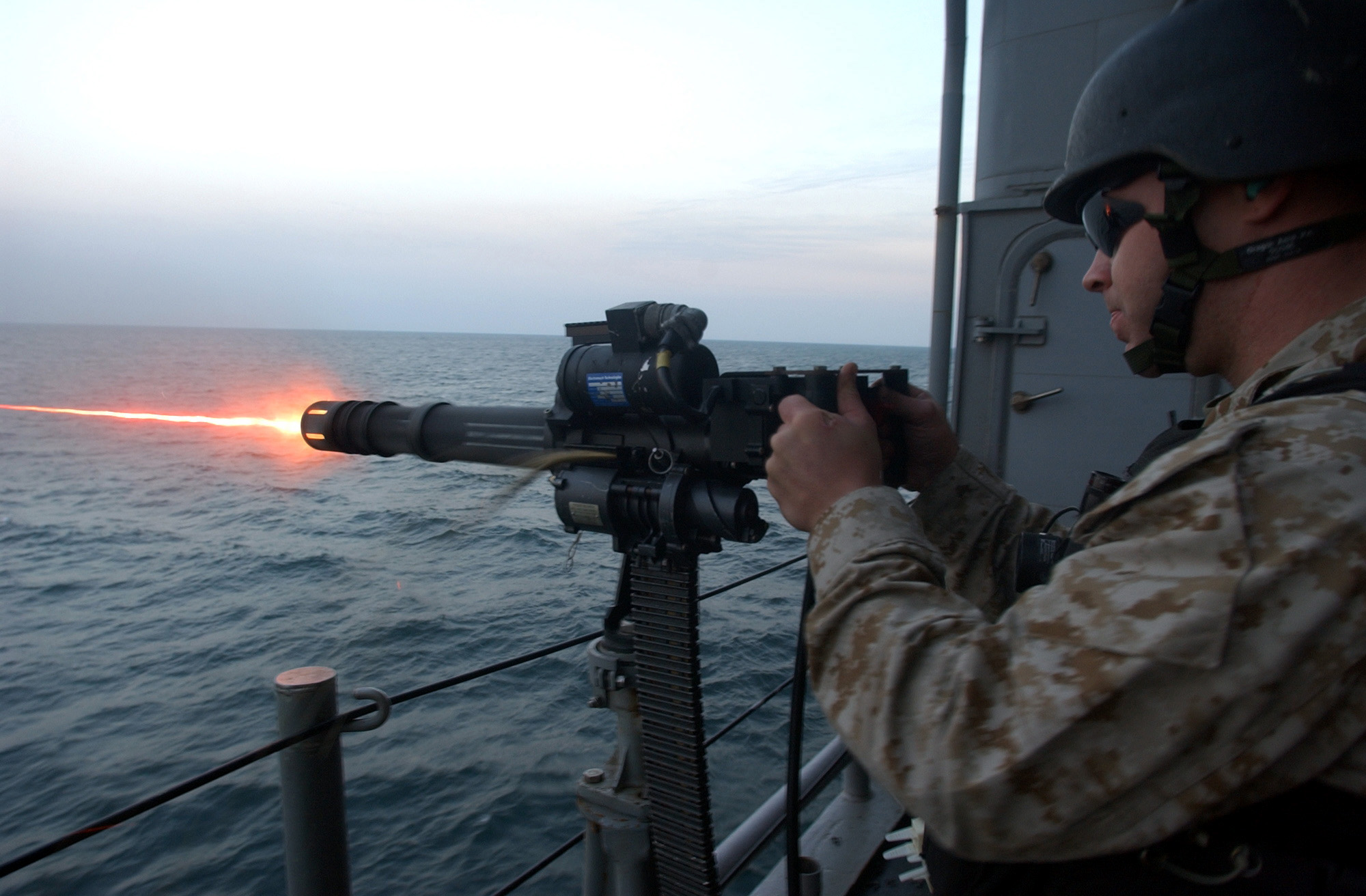
FAST Marine firing a GAU-17/A minigun

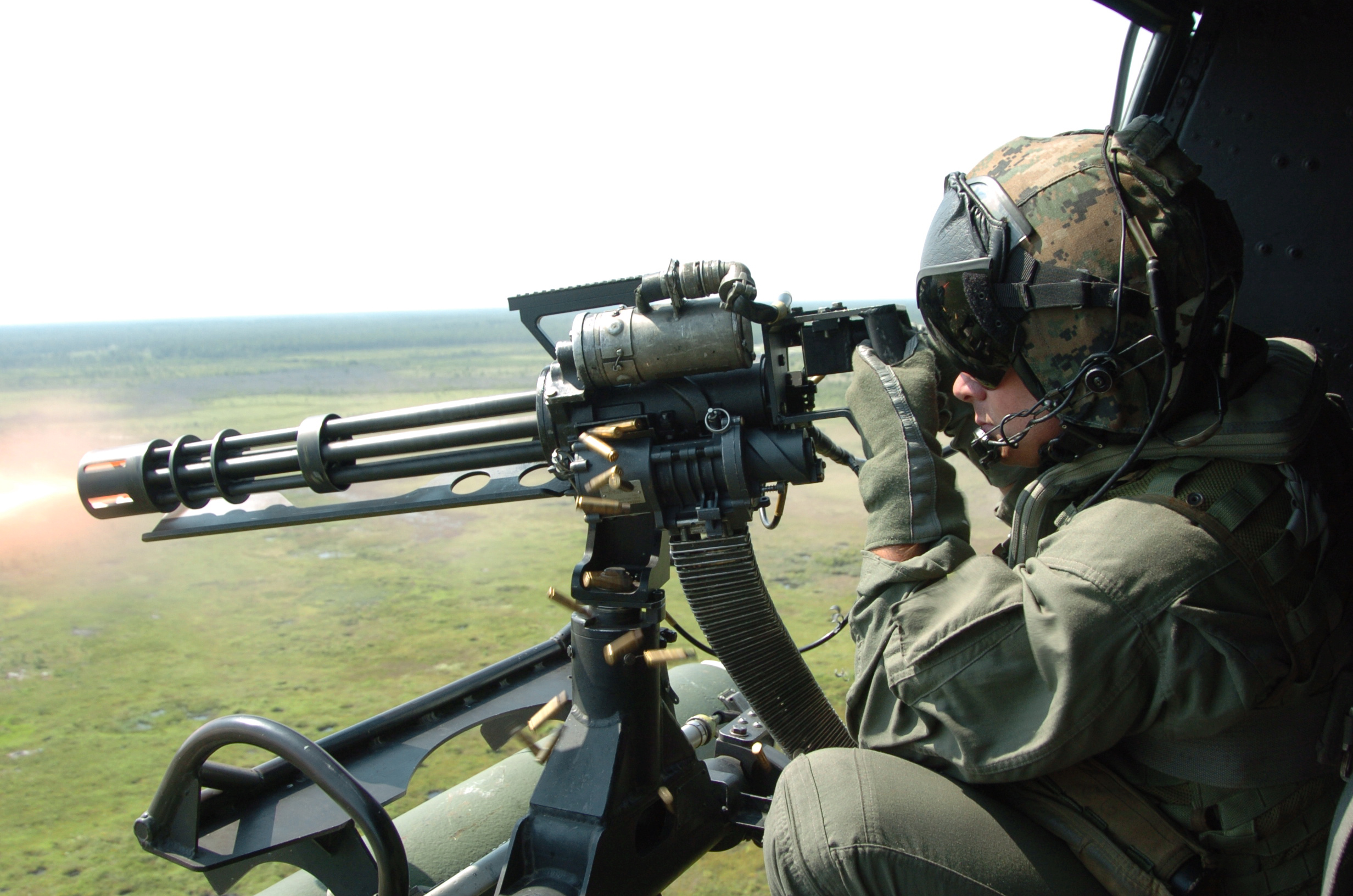
GAU-17/A

Designation			Description
US Army	US Air Force	US Navy	Description
XM134/M134	GAU-2/A	—N/a	7.62×51mm NATO GE "Minigun" 6-barreled machine gun
—N/a	GAU-2A/A	—N/a	GAU-2/A variant; unknown differences
M134	GAU-2B/A	Mk 25 MOD0	GAU-2A/A variant; unknown differences
—N/a	GAU-17/A	—N/a	GAU-2B/A variant; can be mounted to a variety of different craft, uses either an MAU-201/A or MAU-56/A delinking feeder.
—N/a	—N/a	Mk 44	Unknown differences
XM214 Microgun	—N/a	—N/a	Scaled-down variant of the XM134 firing the 5.56×45mm NATO round. The U.S. military lost interest in the project, and it never entered mass production.
XM196	—N/a	—N/a	M134/GAU-2B/A variant; housing modified by addition of an ejection sprocket; for use in the XM53 armament subsystem on the AH-56 helicopter

=== Gun pods and other mounting systems ===
One of the first applications of the weapon was in aircraft armament pods. These gun pods were used by a wide variety of fixed- and rotary-wing aircraft mainly during the Vietnam War, remaining in inventory for a period afterward. The standard pod, designated SUU-11/A by the Air Force and M18 by the U.S. Army, was a relatively simple unit, completely self-contained, with a 1,500-round magazine directly feeding delinked ammunition into the weapon. This means the Minigun fitted to the pod does not require the standard MAU-56/A delinking feeder unit. A number of variants of this pod exist.

Initially, on fixed-wing gunships such as the Douglas AC-47 Spooky and Fairchild AC-119, the side-firing armament was fitted by combining SUU-11/A aircraft pods, often with their aerodynamic front fairings removed, with a locally fabricated mount. These pods were essentially unmodified, required no external power, and were linked to the aircraft's fire controls. The need for those pods for other missions led to the development and fielding of a purpose-built "Minigun module" for gunship use, designated the MXU-470/A. These units first arrived in January 1967 with features such as an improved 2,000-round drum and an electric feeder allowing simplified reloading in flight. The initial units were unreliable and were withdrawn almost immediately. By the end of the year, the difficulties had been worked out and the units were again being fitted to AC-47s, AC-119s, and AC-130s, with a specific ammunition load that replaced every fifth 'ball' round with a tracer round to enable better accuracy by the gunners, and also earning these airborne gunships the nickname 'Puff the Magic Dragon' by the Viet Cong due to their apparent ability of spitting fire and making everything they hit disappear or die. The AC-47 had three side-mounted MXU-470/As (four were mounted on its replacement, the AC-119) and when all firing at once created a devastating image in the eyes of the enemy. The first AC-130A Gunship IIs did away with the MXU-470/A mounts and instead used GAU-2/As, and not only had four 7.62mm GAU-2/A minigun mounts, but added four 20mm M61 Vulcan 6-barrel rotary cannons; this configuration was upgraded two years later in 1969 by removing two each of the GAU-2/As and M61s and adding two 40 mm (1.58 in) L/60 Bofors cannons in the aptly named AC-130A 'Surprise Package'. This configuration lasted two more years until, in late 1971, the AC-130E Pave Aegis arrived, which did away with the miniguns altogether and one of the 40mm Bofors and instead went to the configuration of two 20mm M61 Vulcan, one 40mm L/60 Bofors and one 105 mm (4.13 in) M102 howitzer, a configuration that lasted until the early 2000s when the AC-130Hs (the AC-130Es had had an avionics upgrade and redesignated to H models) underwent a refit and the two M61 Vulcans were removed and replaced with one General Dynamics 25 mm (0.984 in) GAU-12/U Equalizer 5-barrel rotary cannon (while still retaining the H suffix).

The improved MXU-470/As were even being proposed for lighter aircraft such as the Cessna O-2 Skymaster used by Forward Air Controllers but proved too heavy and cumbersome. A fit of two MXU-470/As was also tested on the Fairchild AU-23A Peacemaker, though the Royal Thai Air Force later elected to use another configuration with the M197 20 mm cannon.

In September 2013, Dillon Aero released the DGP2300 gun pod for the M134D-H. It contains 3,000 rounds, enough ammunition to fire the minigun for a full minute. The system is entirely self-contained, so it can be mounted on any aircraft that can handle the weight, rotational torque, and recoil force (190 lbf (850 N)) of the gun. The pod has its own battery, which can be wired into the aircraft's electrical system to maintain a charge.

Designation		Description
US Army	US Air Force	Description
XM18	SUU-11/A	Gun pod fitted with the GAU-2/A/M134 7.62 mm machine gun and fixed rate of fire of 4,000 RPM
XM18E1/M18	SUU-11A/A	SUU-11/A/XM18 variant; various improvements including additional auxiliary power and selectable fire-rate capability (2,000 or 4,000 RPM)
M18E1/A1	SUU-11B/A	SUU-11A/A/M18 variant; differences modified selectable fire-rate capability (3,000 or 6,000 RPM)
N/A	MXU-470/A	Emerson Electric module for mounting a GAU-2B/A minigun; used in AC-47, AC-119G/K, and AC-130A/E/H aircraft

Various iterations of the minigun have also been used in a number of armament subsystems for helicopters, with most of these subsystems being created by the United States. The first systems utilized the weapon in a forward firing role for a variety of helicopters, some of the most prominent examples being the M21 armament subsystem for the UH-1 and the M27 for the OH-6. It also formed the primary turret-mounted armament for a number of members of the Bell AH-1 Cobra family. The weapon was also used as a pintle-mounted door gun on a wide variety of transport helicopters, a role it continues to fulfill today.

US Navy designation	Description
Mk 77 MOD0	Machine gun mount for the GAU-2/Mk 25 MOD0/GAU-17 series of machine guns; deck mount applications
Mk 16 MOD8, MOD9, or MOD11	Mount for medium and heavy machine guns onto naval, ground, or air vehicles
Mk 49 MOD0 and MOD1	Remote weapon station mount

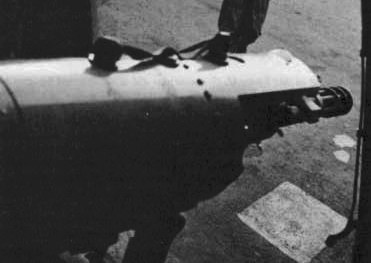
SUU-11/A pod in the cargo door of an AC-47

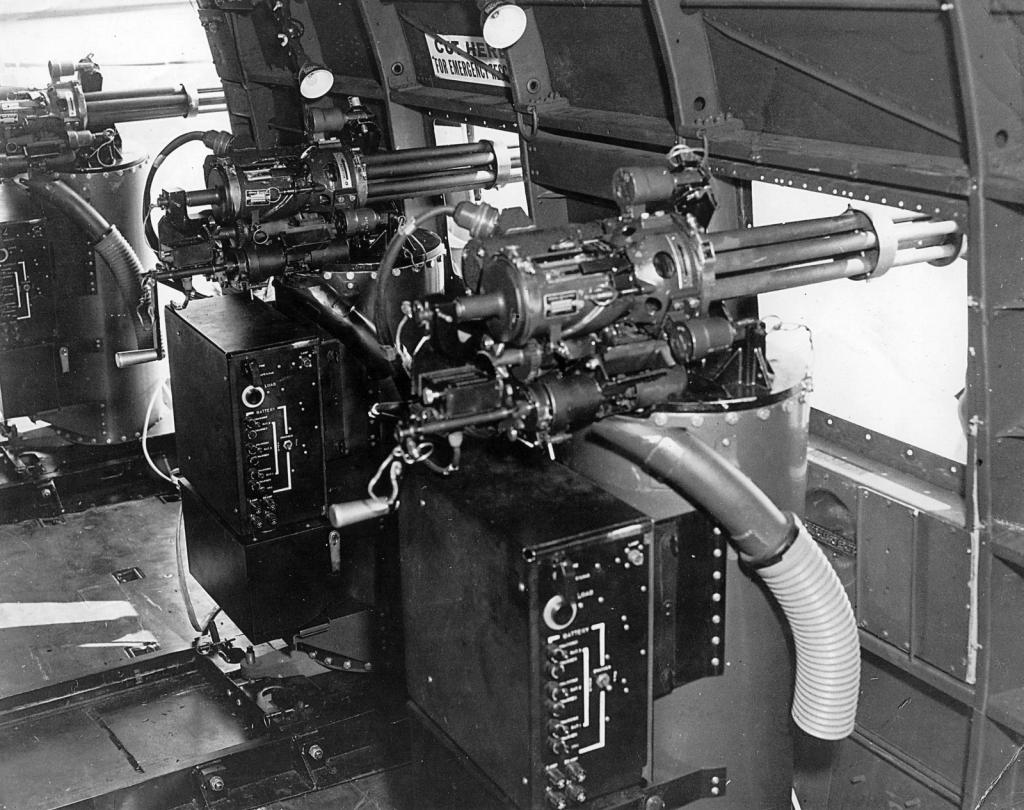
MXU-470/A modules in an AC-47

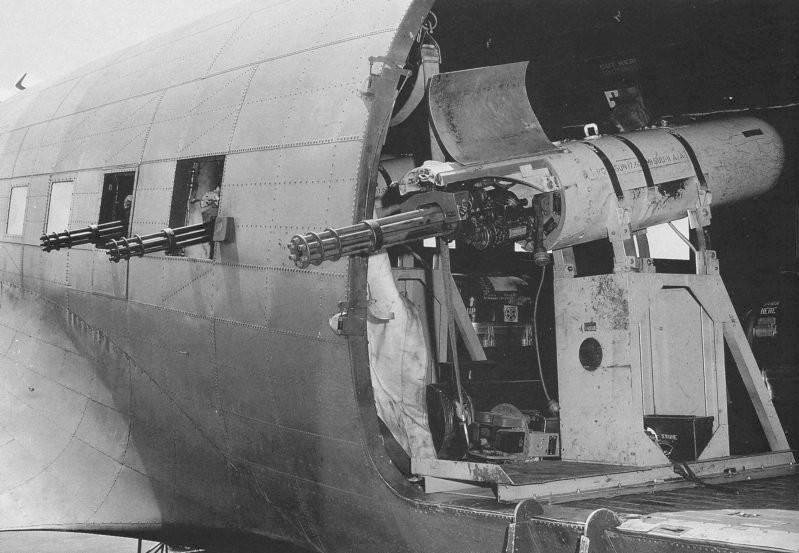
Douglas AC-47 Spooky with SUU-11/A pods

== Users ==
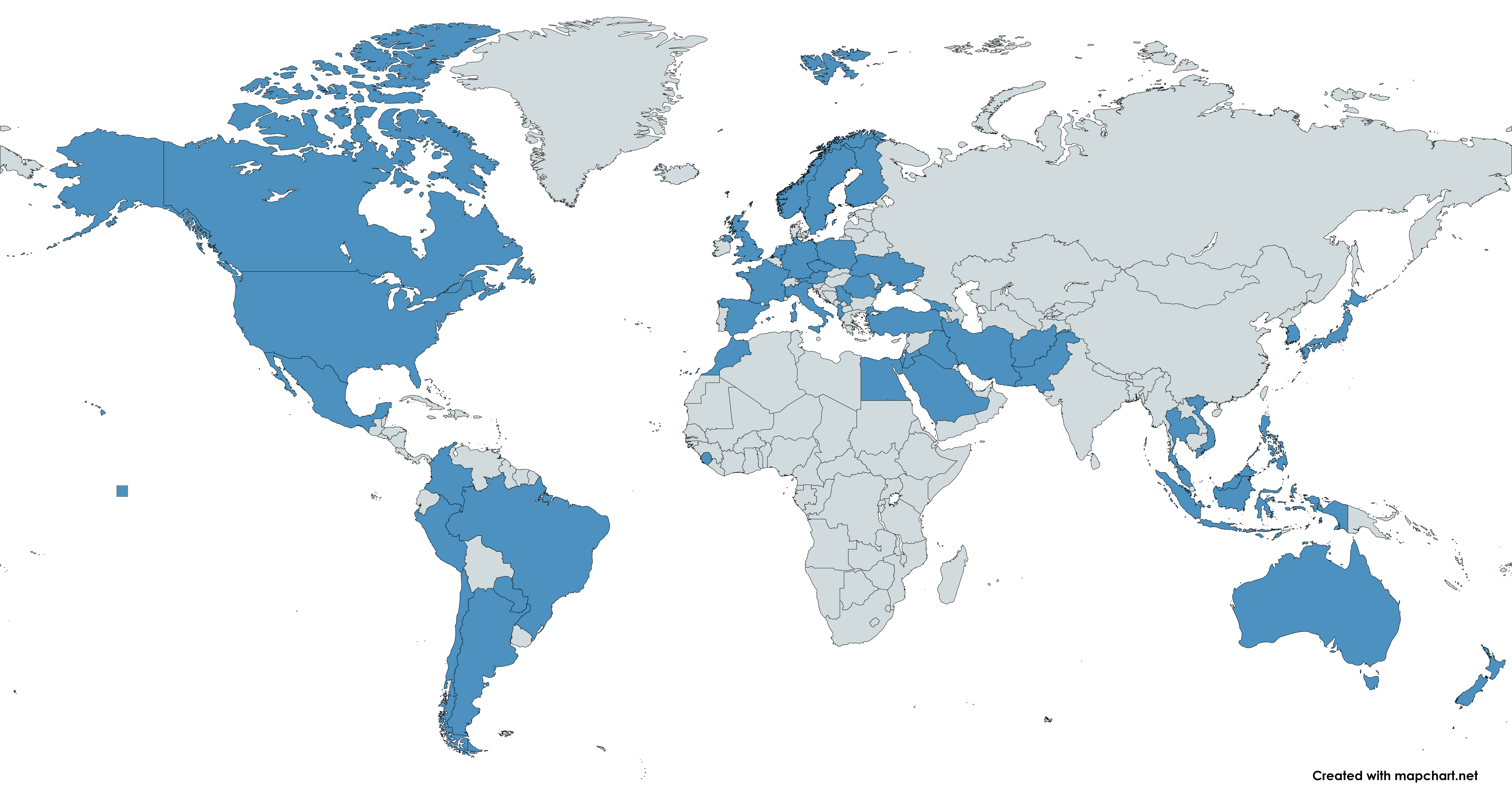
Map with M134 Minigun users in blue

- Afghanistan
- Argentina
- Australia
- Austria
- Brazil
- Brunei
- Canada
- Chile
- Colombia – Used on UH-60L, Mi-17, and UH-1N helicopters.
- Czech Republic
- Egypt
- France
- Finland
- Georgia
- Germany
- India
- Indonesia
- Iraq
- Iran
- Israel
- Italy
- Japan
- Jordan
- Malaysia
- Mexico
- Morocco
- Netherlands
- New Zealand (testing)
- Norway
- Pakistan
- Paraguay
- Peru
- Philippines
- Poland
- South Korea
- Romania – Used on IAR 330 helicopters
- Saudi Arabia
- Serbia
- Sierra Leone
- Spain
- Sweden
- Thailand
- Turkey
- Ukraine
- United Kingdom
- United States
- Vietnam

== Fiction and popular culture ==
A distinctive invention of fiction is the hand-held M134 minigun, often utilizing a rig similar to a chainsaw grip, a concept which was popularized by the 1980s-90s films Predator and Terminator 2: Judgment Day, wielded by Jesse Ventura/Bill Duke and Arnold Schwarzenegger, respectively. Decades later, the man-portable minigun appears in video games and films such as Captain America: The Winter Soldier, Grand Theft Auto, Team Fortress 2, and Furious 7 (the latter where it is fired by Dwayne Johnson). Generally, such depictions ignore the weapon's need for external power, and sometimes even forget it requires a source of ammunition. In actuality, a man-portable M134 minigun would be near impossible, and highly impractical for a human being to either carry or operate (a down-scaled version of the M134, the XM214 Microgun, never reached production status for such reasons). Behind the scenes, the armorers slowed down the M134 minigun's rate of fire to conserve ammo (as well as making the spinning barrels visible to the movie audience), with a hidden power cable for the firing scenes, and used blank ammo to ease recoil. Nonetheless the resultant prop is still extremely demanding, hence the actors wielding it were physically imposing and often had bodybuilding backgrounds.

== See also ==
- List of multiple barrel firearms
- AAI In-Line
- EX-17 Heligun – Two-barrel 7.62 mm calibre machine gun
- GAU-19 – Electrically-driven heavy machine gun
- GShG-7.62 machine gun
- Komodo Armament Eli gun – Indonesian six-barrel rotary machine gun
- Multiple-barrel firearm – Type of firearm with more than one barrel
- YakB-12.7 machine gun
- XM133 Minigun – American rotary machine gun
- XM214 Microgun – American prototype 5.56 mm rotary-barreled machine gun

== Sources ==
- Ballad, Jack S. (1982). Development and Employment of Fixed-Wing Gunships, 1962–1972. Washington, D.C.: Office of Air Force History, United States Air Force.
- Davis, Larry (1982). Gunships: A Pictorial History of Spooky. TX: Squadron/Signal Publications. ISBN 978-0-89747-123-7.
- Gervasi, Tom (1984). Arsenal of Democracy III: America's War Machine, the Pursuit of Global Dominance. New York: Grove Press, Inc. ISBN 978-0-394-54102-0.
- Gunston, Bill (1988). The Illustrated Encyclopedia of Aircraft Armament. New York: Orion Books. ISBN 978-0-517-56607-7.
- Headquarters, Department of the Army (1969). FM 1-40 Attack Helicopter Gunnery. Washington, D.C.: Headquarters, Department of the Army.
- Pretty, Ronald T., ed. (1986). Jane's Weapon Systems, 1986–1987. London: Jane's Publishing Company, Ltd. ISBN 978-0-7106-0832-1.
