= GShG-7.62 machine gun =

Glagolev-Shipunov-Gryazev GShG-7.62 rotary machine gun
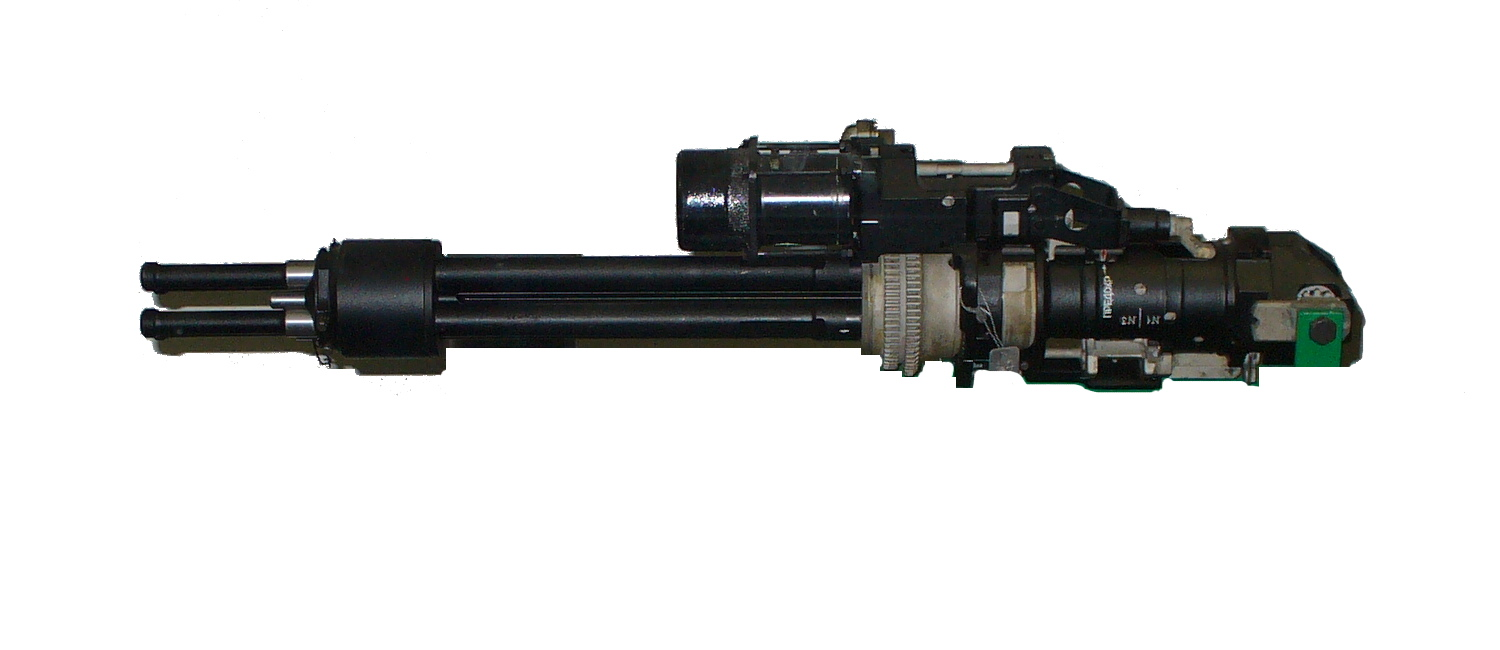
- GShG-7.62
- Type: Gatling-type Multiple-barrel firearm
- Place of origin: Soviet Union

Service history
- In service: 1970–present
- Used by: Soviet Union, Russia

Production history
- Designer: KBP Instrument Design Bureau
- Designed: 1968–1970
- Manufacturer: KBP Instrument Design Bureau
- Produced: 1970–present

Specifications
- Mass: 19 kg (42 lb)
- Length: 800 mm (31 in)
- Barrel length: 605 mm (23.8 in)
- Cartridge: 7.62×54mmR
- Caliber: 7.62 mm
- Barrels: 4
- Action: Gas-operated
- Rate of fire: 6,000 RPM
- Muzzle velocity: 850 m/s
- Maximum firing range: 1,000 m (3,300 ft)

The Glagolev-Shipunov-Gryazev GShG-7.62 (Russian: Глаголев-Шипунов-Грязев ГШГ-7,62) is a four-barreled rotary machine gun designed in the Soviet Union, similar to firearms such as the M134 Minigun. It is a hybrid weapon using both propellant gas and an electric drive to rotate the barrels, in contrast with most other rotary guns which are often purely electrically driven. It was developed in 1968–1970 for the Mi-24 helicopter together with YakB 12.7mm machine gun, and is currently used in GUV-8700 gun pods, and flexible mounts on Kamov Ka-29.

== See also ==
- Fokker-Leimberger
- XM214 Microgun
- M197 Gatling gun
- Komodo Armament Eli gun
- Nordenfelt Gun
- Gast Gun
- Chain gun
- Gatling gun, the 1860s firearm that originated the rotating-barrel concept
- List of Russian weaponry
