= Fokker-Leimberger =

Externally powered, 12-barrel rifle-caliber rotary cannon

- Type: Multi-barelled Machine gun
- Place of origin: German Empire

Service history
- In service: Trials only

Production history
- Designer: A.H.G. Fokker & ? Leimberger
- Designed: 1916

Specifications
- Cartridge: 8x57mm IS
- Caliber: 7.92 mm
- Barrels: 12
- Rate of fire: (claimed) 7,200+ rpm
- Feed system: Belt
- Sights: Iron

The Fokker-Leimberger was an externally powered, 12-barrel rifle-caliber rotary gun developed in Germany during the First World War. The action of the Fokker-Leimberger differed from that of a Gatling in that it employed a rotary split-breech design, also known as a "nutcracker".

Fokker claimed the gun achieved over 7,200 rpm, although this may be an exaggeration. Failures during the war were attributed to the poor quality of German wartime ammunition, although a British 1950s experimental weapon with the same type of breech had ruptured-case problems. Fokker continued to experiment with this type of breech after his post-war move to the United States. A different Fokker prototype in a US museum attests to the failure of this line of development.

== Design ==
The Fokker-Leimberger used a rotary split-breech design known as the "nutcracker". In this design a temporary chamber is formed by joining the two cavities of touching, counter-rotating sprockets. The simplicity of the design was appealing, particularly because it contained no major parts using a reciprocating motion, like the breechblock used in many other automatic weapons. Ignoring the various material stresses, the maximum rate of fire was thus theoretically limited only by the time needed to complete the burning of the propellant from each cartridge (although, practically, barrel heating is a far more serious constraint). Anthony Williams commented on this design that: "Fokker claimed that 7,200 rpm was achieved, but knowing Fokker, there is some reason to assume that that may have been slightly exaggerated. Problems occurred, of course, with cases bursting on the seam between the two cylinders." Another "Fokker Split Breech Rotary Machine Gun, ca. 1930" was donated by Val Forgett to Kentucky Military Treasures in 1977; according to the museum record it "proved unsuccessful because of its inability to seal breech cylinders". The British also experimented with this type of breech for aircraft guns in the 1950s, but abandoned it. This type of breech has only been used successfully in low-pressure applications, such as the Mk 18 Mod 0 grenade launcher.

The Fokker-Leimberger used percussion ignition with the firing pins mounted on a swashplate. No extractor was employed; the spent cases were simply left on the outgoing belt. The gun would have had to be pre-rotated in flight in order to ensure that when the trigger was pulled it would have fired at its maximum speed at once. As in Gatling designs, the use of multiple barrels enabled air cooling of each barrel in the time between successive shots that were fired from the same barrel.

== History ==
The development program that lead to the Fokker-Leimberger prototype was apparently initiated by the Idflieg through a circular sent to German firearms manufacturers on 16 August 1916. This document, which was written by Major Wilhelm Siegert, requested lightweight designs with a high rate of fire for use in German aircraft. It also suggested that external power sources be used for the automatic firing, like the aircraft engine itself or electrical power. The circular was answered by designs from various German companies. Besides Fokker, Siemens, Autogen and Szakats-Gotha also submitted proposals. None of these entered mass production before the war ended, although the Siemens prototype was used on the Western front and claimed one aerial victory.

As with his other machine-gun-related designs, Fokker collaborated with Heinrich W. Lübbe and with another engineer named Leimberger for this project. Initially they developed a simple adaptation of the Maxim action (itself widely used in Germany as the MG 08), driven by a crank from the engine. Their more ambitious project however employed the yet unproven split-breech action, in a 12-barrel design. The idea for this type of breech was not entirely new, having been patented in the US as early as 1861 (USPTO #32,316). (Other US patents from the early 1920s indicate there was renewed experimentation with this design in the US as well.)

No record survives for the gun's ballistic performance, beside the claim for over 7,200 rounds per minute. However, problems with ammunition were recorded, as "only too often the cases tore open in the gun". After the war, a Fokker-Leimberger prototype was claimed as personal property by A. H. G. Fokker, and he took it with him when he emigrated to the US in 1922. The donation record for the exemplar now found at the Kentucky Historical Society states that all other exemplars were destroyed.

== See also ==
- Centrifugal gun – Projectile Accelerator (actively considered for aircraft armament by the US during WWI)
- Fokker's synchronizer – Device to synchronise the firing of a warplane's automatic guns with its spinning propeller
- M134 Minigun – American rotary machine gun
- XM214 Microgun – American prototype 5.56 mm rotary-barreled machine gun
