= XM214 Microgun =

American prototype 5.56 mm rotary-barreled machine gun

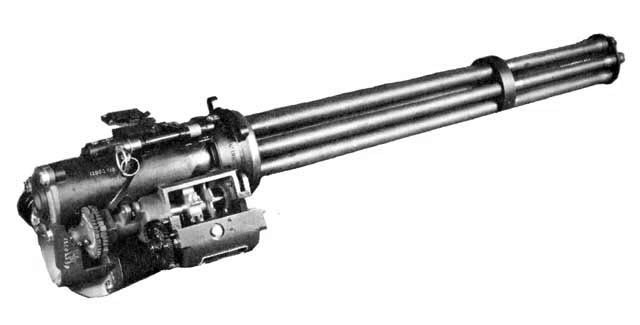
- XM214 Microgun
- Type: Rotary-barrel machine gun
- Place of origin: United States

Production history
- Designer: General Electric
- Designed: 1966
- Manufacturer: General Electric/General Dynamics
- Produced: 1970s - ?; In G.E. catalog until late 1990s
- No. built: Unknown; 10 Six-Paks delivered to WECOM/US Air Force

Specifications
- Mass: 10.2 kg (22 lb) gun body 38.6 kg (85 lb) complete with tripod, integral battery unit, feed chute and 1,000 rounds of ammunition in container
- Length: 732 mm (28.8 in)
- Barrel length: 533 mm (21.0 in)
- Cartridge: 5.56×45mm M193
- Caliber: 5.56 mm
- Action: Mechanically driven rotary breech; motor develops 0.75 hp (0.56 kW) @ 2,000 rpm; 1.5 hp (1.1 kW) @ 10,000 rpm
- Rate of fire: Prototype and gun pod for aircraft: variable from 400 to 10,000 rpm (1,000; 10,000 rpm were available) Six-Pak: 0.6 kW at 4,000 rpm; bursts from 3 to 1,500 rounds
- Muzzle velocity: 3,250 ft/s (990 m/s)
- Feed system: Belt and chute
- Sights: Iron

The XM214 Microgun is an American prototype 5.56 mm rotary-barreled machine gun. It was designed and built by General Electric. The XM214 was a scaled-down smaller and lighter version of the M134 Minigun, firing M193 5.56×45mm ammunition.

== Development ==
The XM214 was first developed for aircraft applications. Later General Electric developed it into a man-portable weapon system, known as the GE Six-Pak. The complete Six-Pak system weighed 85 pounds (38.5 kg) with 1,000 rounds of ammunition, comparable in weight to some heavy machine guns. The basic gun in the Six-Pak weighed 27 pounds, or 12.2 kg. The system could be carried by a team of two soldiers and mounted either to an M122 tripod or a vehicle's pintle mount. The overall length is 104 cm, the gun only is 68.6 cm. The width (including ammunition case) is 44.4 cm. Sighting was usually by optical telescope.

The Six-Pak consisted of the XM214, the power module, and the ammunition module consisted of two 500-round, factory packed, and disposable cassettes mounted to a holding rack. Linked ammunition was fed through a flexible chute to the gun; when the first cassette was empty, ammunition would then feed from the second cassette, tripping a visible signal that a new cassette needed to be added to the rack.

The power module contained a 24-volt nickel-cadmium battery, a 0.8 horsepower (0.60 kW) motor, and solid-state electronic controls. Unless the battery was plugged into a vehicle's power supply, the battery's charge would be depleted after 3,000 rounds. The system could be broken down quickly into two portable loads of roughly 42 pounds (19 kg) apiece. This was accomplished by means of a quick-release fitting at that end of the belt chute fastened to the gun.

Electronic controls contained a burst limiter and handled the automatic clearing of the gun after bursts. Using the electronic controls, the weapon's rate of fire could be adjusted from 400 rpm all the way up to 4,000 rpm. Later editions of Jane's Infantry Weapons claimed a theoretical cyclic rate of up to 6,000 rpm. George Chinn, author of The Machine Gun Volume V, contended that the XM214 prototype had a rate of fire of up to 10,000 rpm, but the man-portable Six-Pak was limited to 4,000 rpm. General Electric tested it successfully at 12,000 rpm.

=== Microgun Pod ===
An 88 by 10 inch (224 x 25 cm) 5.56mm Microgun Pod was also developed for external use on light aircraft and helicopters. The unit had an ammunition capacity of 1,500 to 3,500 rounds and a loaded weight of 186 to 300 pounds (84 to 136 kg). The feeding system was linkless via a helical drum and had a nominal rate of fire of 6,000 rpm. Adjustments to 1,000 or 10,000 rpm were possible if desired. Power could be provided by a built-in battery pack or from the aircraft itself.

== Promotion and reception ==
The ability to fire the 5.56 mm round used by the M16 rifle was the major selling point for the Microgun. With a fast-firing gun using standard rifle ammunition, the US Army and US Air Force showed interest for use of the XM214 on aircraft, helicopters, and armored vehicles. The smaller and lighter Microgun could replace the Minigun on heavily armed gunship aircraft and attack helicopters, freeing up space for ammo, equipment, and even more guns. Certain small aircraft that could not handle the larger Miniguns could be given the XM214 in a 300-pound (136 kg) pod. General Electric pitched the weapon to the US Navy for use on riverine craft. Company engineers proposed many mounting arrangements including open doors, in an aircraft's wings or nose, putting half a dozen guns in a modified bomb bay, and even in turrets of an automated defense network. However, the Microgun's prominent feature of using 5.56 mm ammunition was also its downfall. For aircraft gunners, accuracy suffered at high speeds, and range, compared to the 7.62 mm Minigun, was limited. General Electric tried to refocus its efforts by making the Microgun an infantry weapon, but the Army showed no interest.

== See also ==
- M134 Minigun – American rotary machine gun in 7.62×51mm.
- EX-17 Heligun – Two-barrel 7.62 mm calibre machine gun, a rival to the M134.
- Fokker-Leimberger – Externally powered, 12-barrel rifle-caliber rotary cannon - Imperial Germany.
- GShG-7.62 machine gun - Russia.
- Hua Qing Minigun - China.
- AAI In-Line
- List of multiple-barrel firearms
- Multiple-barrel firearm – Type of firearm with more than one barrel
