= Mil Mi-36 =

Soviet military support helicopter

Mi-36

General information
- Type: Military support helicopter
- National origin: Soviet Union
- Manufacturer: Mil Moscow Helicopter Plant

The Mil Mi-36 was an unrealised Soviet light multipurpose helicopter project started in the early 1980s. Its projected roles were to assist in fire support and communications, cargo transportation, SAR and medevac, and aerial surveillance. It was also planned to use twin TV-O-100 turboshaft engines, a two-bladed main rotor and a four-bladed tail rotor.

== Design and development ==
At the start of the 1980s the development of the TV-O-100 turbine gave Soviet designers their first lightweight powerplant which was suitable for smaller high-performance helicopters. This allowed the development of a new class of lightweight combat helicopters to augment the larger and more powerful transport, assault and anti-tank platforms.

Roles envisaged for such a helicopter included attack, close-range infantry support, troop transport with four soldiers, medivac with four stretchers, SAR/CSAR, liaison, light cargo, reconnaissance, artillery fire correction, as well as the potential capacity to eventually act as a scout, spotter, and provide target identification/approval for new dedicated attack helicopters (the projected Mil Mi-28 and Kamov Ka-50). Specifications also included day, night and all-weather capabilities.

Experience with the Mil Mi-24 in Afghanistan showed the vulnerability of helicopters to ambushes from infantry, RPG and MANPAD fire, as well as the need to counter this threat through vigilance and by immediately returning suppressive fire (even if the attack came from behind). As a result, the new scout helicopter would have been designed from the start to have a 360 degree retaliatory capability in the form of two gun turrets. These were to be of 7.62 mm calibre and it is likely that the gun used would have been the new GShG-7.62 machine gun which had been developed primarily as a defensive gun for helicopters (mounted as part of the organic armament of the Kamov Ka-29TB assault transport).

In addition, stub wings could be attached, giving the capability to carry bombs, gunpods, rockets and up to eight anti-tank missiles (this would have likely been 9K114 Shturm missiles in either the new four round launcher being developed for the Mil Mi-8 or possibly on special stub wings each with a pair of twin launchers).

A civil version was also planned which would have carried ten people or one ton of cargo and had secondary patrol and rescue capabilities.

The original specification called for a 2500 kg takeoff weight, but attempts to meet the required mixture of weapons, transport and survivability meant that the weight quickly climbed to 3400 kg. Meanwhile, Kamov had designed a more specialised platform in the 2200 kg range in the form of the Kamov V-60 which was favoured but not produced either. Much of the design philosophy was retained and subsequently grew into the Mil Mi-40 which was proposed within a year of work ceasing on the Mi-36.

== See also ==
Related development

- Kamov V-60
- Mil Mi-40

Aircraft of comparable role, configuration, and era

- OH-58
