= Komodo Armament Eli gun =

Indonesian six-barrel rotary machine gun

Eli gun
- Type: Rotary machine gun
- Place of origin: Indonesia; Italy

Service history
- Wars: None

Production history
- Designer: Komodo Armament
- Manufacturer: Komodo Armament
- Produced: 2014–present

Specifications
- Mass: 68 lb (31 kg) system weight, 43 lb (20 kg) gun only
- Length: 38 in (970 mm)
- Barrel length: 23.5 in (600 mm)
- Width: 13.4 in (340 mm)
- Height: 11.2 in (280 mm)
- Cartridge: 7.62×51mm NATO
- Caliber: 7.62 mm (0.308 in)
- Barrels: 6
- Action: External electric power
- Rate of fire: Variable, 3,000–4,000 rpm
- Feed system: 7.62 linked ammunition belt

Eli gun is an Indonesian six-barrel rotary machine gun made by local manufacturer PT Komodo Armament Indonesia. It can be used for various land, air, and sea vehicles. As a modular system, it is easily adapted to any existing platform. It uses 7.62x51 mm NATO ammunition.

== History ==
The first prototype was unveiled in Indo Defence 2014 Expo & Forum. The weapon was a result of cooperation between Indonesia and Italy.

== Potential contracts ==
- A total of 200 units was reported to be ordered by undisclosed Middle Eastern countries. No signed deal available.
- Previously, the government of Italy was rumored to have bought 100 units, but no signed deal is confirmed.

== See also ==
- GShG-7.62
- Hua Qing Minigun
- M134 Minigun
