= EX-17 Heligun =

Two-barrel 7.62 mm calibre machine gun

- Type: Machine gun
- Place of origin: United States

Production history
- Manufacturer: Hughes Aircraft Company

Specifications
- Mass: 13,6– 15 kg
- Length: 760 mm
- Cartridge: 7.62×51mm NATO
- Caliber: 7.62 mm
- Barrels: 2
- Action: Gas operated
- Rate of fire: 4000-6000 rpm
- Feed system: Belt
- Sights: 7

The Hughes EX-17 "Heligun" is a double-barrel 7.62 mm calibre machine gun. The weapon used a gas-operated revolver cannon loading system that produced firing rates around 6,000 RPM, double that of the M134 Minigun, while also lighter and more compact. It was developed by Hughes Aircraft for use in the OH-6 recon helicopter, but not put into production.

== Overview ==
The Heligun was developed by Hughes Aircraft as part of a complete package for the OH-6 Cayuse recon helicopter. It offered a number of significant advantages over the M134 Minigun – it was small, weighed less at only 30 pounds (14 kg) unloaded, was self-powered not electrically driven, and had a 6000 RPM firing rate. Ultimately, it was not adopted because the reliability (mean time between stoppages) could not be brought up to par, and US Army officials decided that it did not offer enough improvement over the already adopted M134 Minigun to be worth the switch.

The operation cycle was relatively complex. The gun fired from two barrels, one above the other. The bottom barrel was fired first, and gas tapped from the barrel fired the second, upper, barrel. This caused the upper barrel to be fired so rapidly after the first that the gas from both was mixed to power the main operating cycle. The barrels were connected to a system that was able to slide fore and aft on a rod between the barrels. The recoil from the two fired rounds pushed the barrel assembly rearward. Connected to the assembly was a cylindrical cam that pushed the revolver section to rotate two rounds into position, while the gas was ejecting the fired rounds out of the revolver.
