= YakB-12.7 machine gun =

Yak-B machine gun
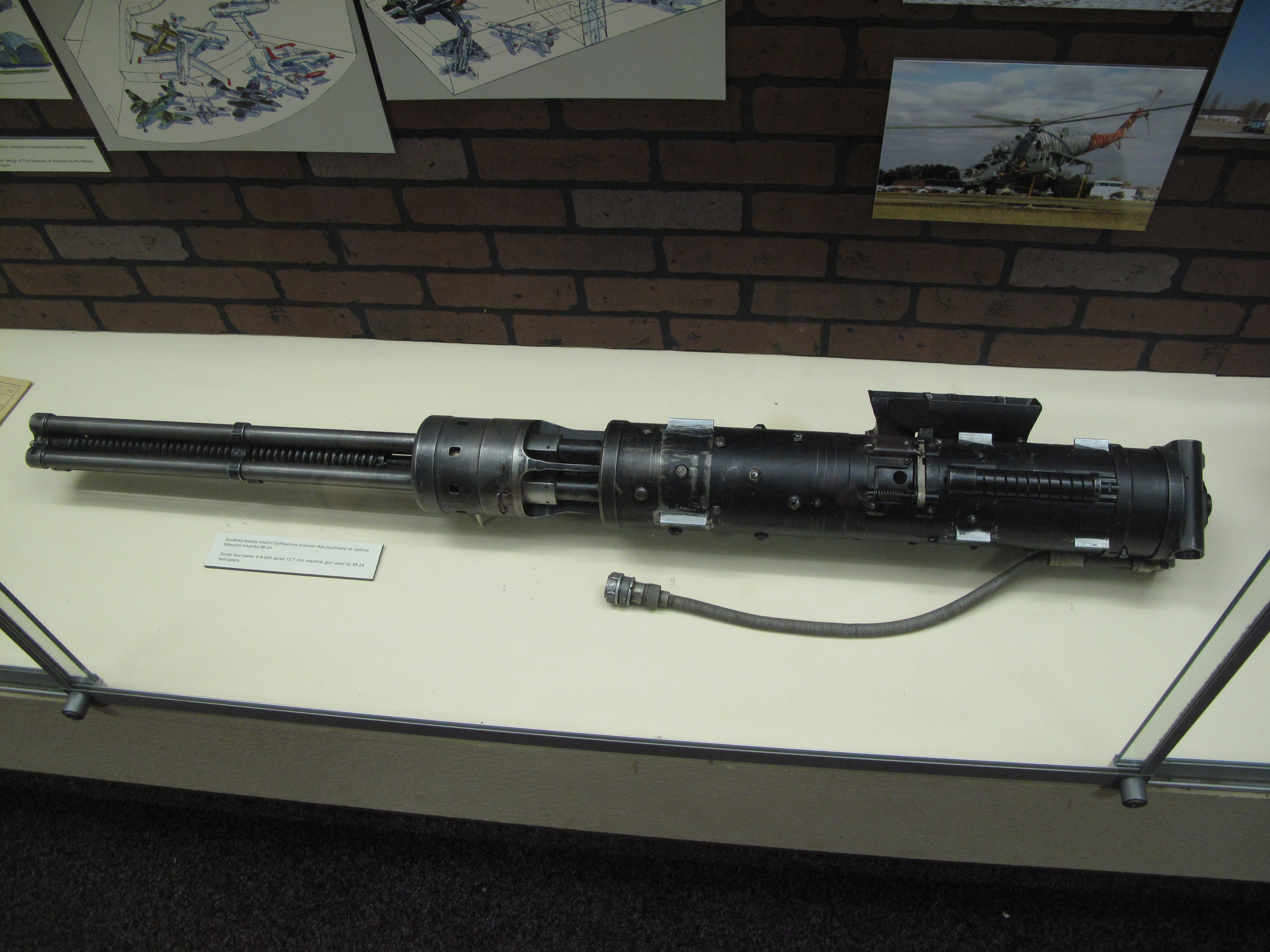
- Yakushev-Borzov YakB-12.7 machine gun in the Prague Aviation Museum)
- Type: Aircraft rotary heavy machine gun
- Place of origin: Soviet Union

Service history
- In service: 1973–present

Production history
- Designer: KBP
- Manufacturer: KBP Instrument Design Bureau

Specifications
- Mass: 45 kg (99 lbs), cartridge weight 0.130 kg, bullet weight 0.048 kg
- Length: 1.345 m (4 ft)
- Width: 0.13 m (5.1 in)
- Shell: 12.7×108mm
- Caliber: 12.7 mm
- Barrels: 4
- Action: Gas-operated
- Rate of fire: 4,000–5,000 rounds/min
- Muzzle velocity: 810 m/s (2,657 ft/s)

The Yakushev-Borzov YakB-12.7 mm (Russian: Якушев-Борзов ЯкБ-12,7) is a remotely controlled 12.7×108mm caliber four-barrel rotary heavy machine gun developed by the Soviet Union in 1973 for the Mil Mi-24 attack gunship and low-capacity troop transporter, with 1470 rounds, which can also be mounted in GUV-8700 machine-gun pods with 750 rounds. It has a high rate of fire (4–5,000 rounds per minute) and is also one of the few self-powered guns of the Gatling type (i.e. it is gas-operated, rather than requiring an external motor to operate).

On the Mi-24 it is mounted in the VSPU-24 undernose turret, with an azimuth of 60° to either side, an elevation of 20°, and a depression of 60°. The gun is slaved to the KPS-53AV undernose sighting system with a reflector sight in the front cockpit.

It was replaced by the fixed, side-mounted GSh-30K or the swivel-mounted GSh-23L in the late mark of the Mi-24 helicopters, as it did not provide enough firepower against dug-in or lightly armored targets that did not necessitate a rocket attack but it is still used on Mil Mi-24, Mil Mi-36, and Mil Mi-40 helicopters.

== Users ==
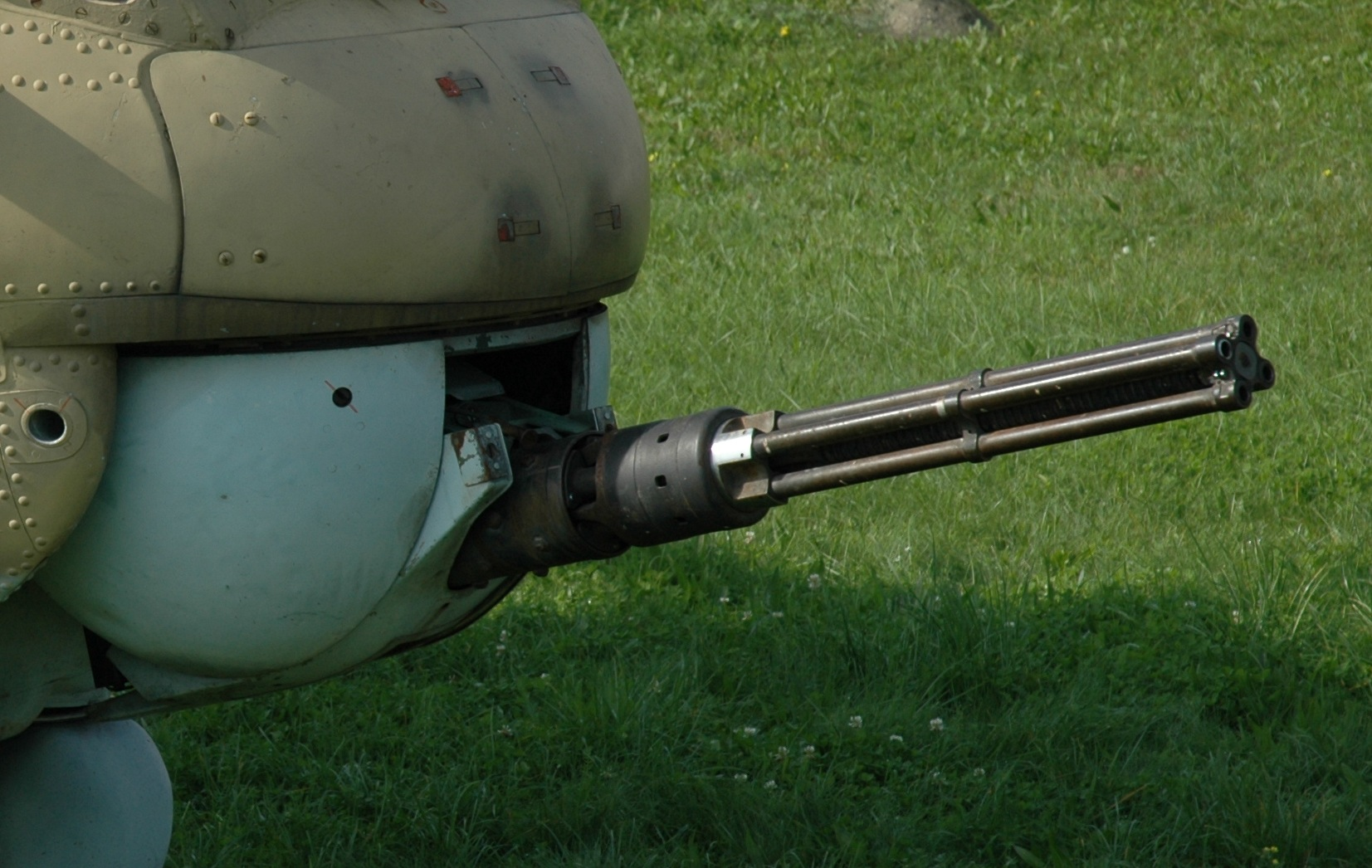
Machine gun on the Mi-24.

- Russia
- Syria
- Ukraine

Former users

- Soviet Union - Passed on to successor states.

== History ==
=== Russo-Ukrainian War ===
In July 2026, a Russian YakB-12.7 was bolted onto a Russian ground vehicle for use against Ukrainian long-range drones during the Russo-Ukrainian War. During its initial test firing, the weapon began rapidly spinning due to being mounted off-center, violently throwing the operator off the vehicle and almost killing the instructor in the process. The incident was recorded on video and widely circulated online.

== See also ==
- GAU-19, a Western 12.7 mm powered Gatling gun
- List of Russian weaponry
- List of multiple-barrel firearms
