= Val Forgett =

American firearms designer (1930–2002)

Val J. Forgett, Jr., (July 31, 1930 – November 25, 2002) founded the Navy Arms Company, Inc., in 1956 and is internationally recognized as the "father of the modern replica firearms business". Forgett created and designed over 100 different replica firearms models. Forgett was President of the National Firearms Museum and Chairman of the United States International Muzzle Loading Team, leading the U.S. to five consecutive World Championships, a feat unmatched to this day. An avid big-game hunter, Forgett was recognized by Safari Club International (SCI) as the first person in over 100 years to take all "Big Five" game species of Africa (lion, leopard, elephant, rhinoceros, and Cape buffalo) with a muzzle-loading rifle.

== Obituaries ==
When Forgett died in 2002 from the effects of myelodysplastic syndrome (MDS), a rare blood cancer, numerous firearms magazines published memorials of his life, including:

- Guns & Ammo ("The Passing of a Legend")
- National Shooting Sports Foundation
