= Gun pod =

Detachable aircraft weapon mount

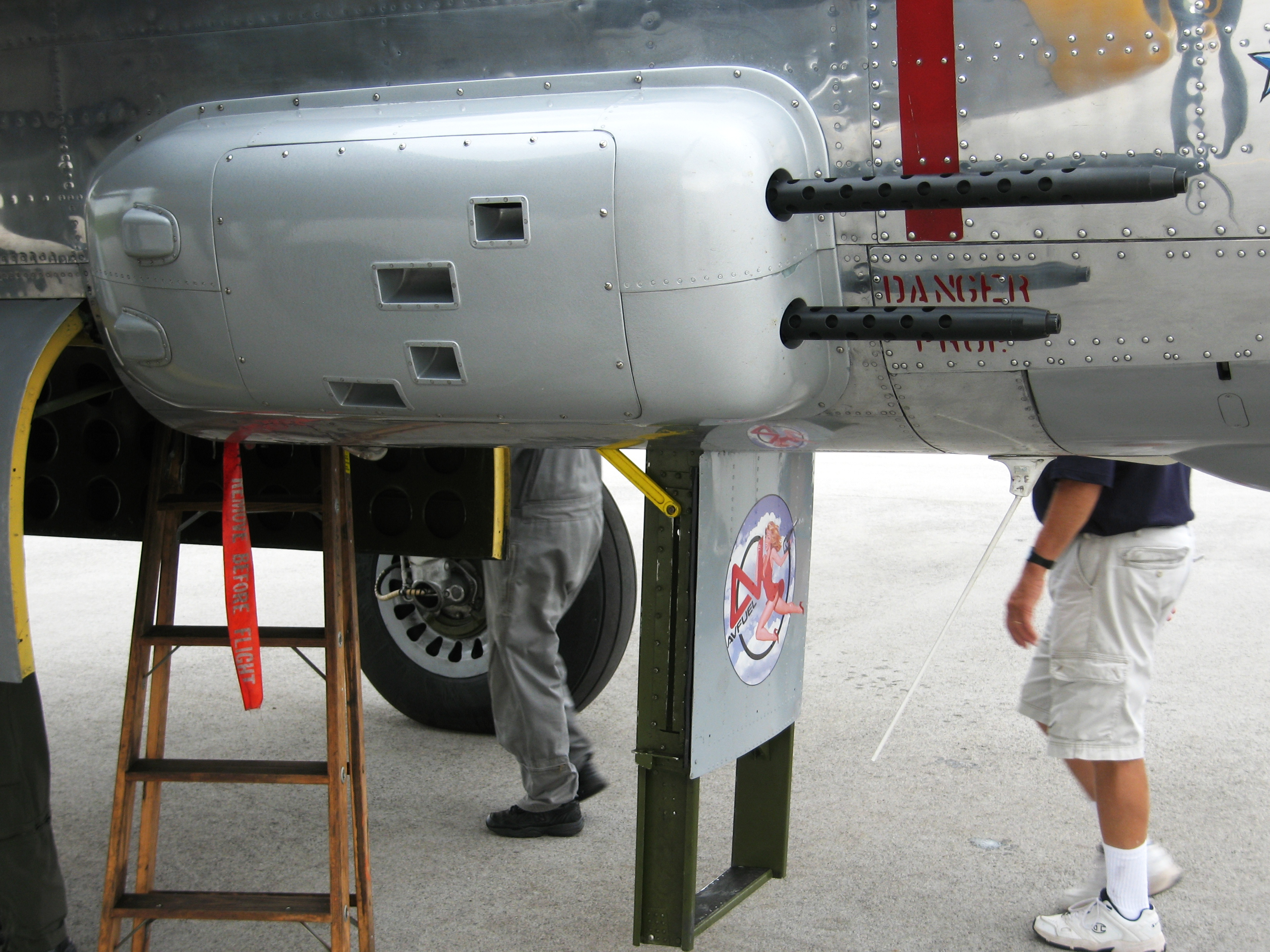
One of the first American attempts at a gun pod was the .50-calibre machine gun conformal-mount "blister" pod on the B-25 Mitchell

A gun pod is a detachable pod or pack containing machine guns, autocannons, revolver cannons, or rotary cannons and ancillaries, mounted externally on a vehicle such as a military aircraft which may or may not also have its own guns.

== History ==
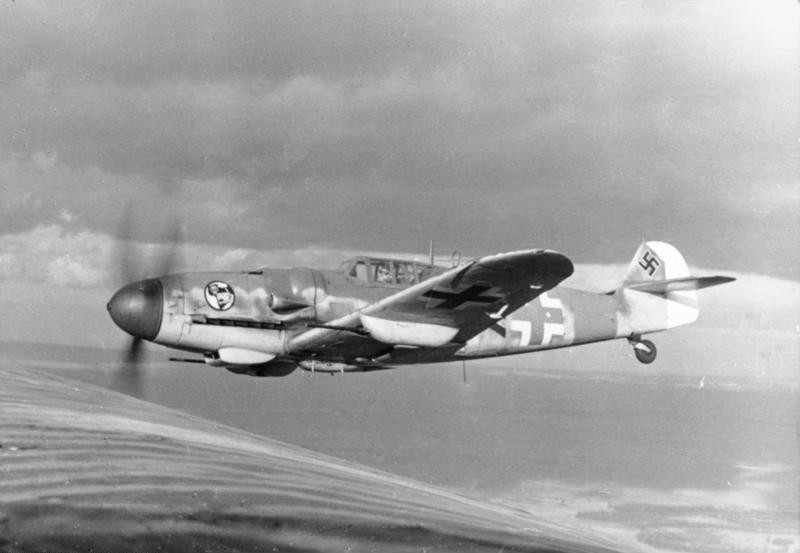
A Bf 109G-6 of the WW II Luftwaffe's JG 27 in Reichsverteidigung service, armed with two MG 151/20 underwing gun pods

In World War II the Third Reich's Luftwaffe made use of many different, and most often rigidly mounted, conformal and suspended-mount gun pod systems usually called Waffenbehälter (prefix of WB, literally 'weapon container') or Waffenträger (prefix of WT, literally 'weapon carrier'), and carrying anything from rifle caliber MG 81 machine guns, all the way up to the enormous Bordkanone anti-tank cannon based ordnance weapon series, ranging from 37 to 75mm in caliber, though the usual underwing conformal gun pods fitted to Bf 109 and Fw 190 single engined fighters used either the MG 151/20 or MK 108 in gun pod mounts.

Other countries also used gun pods on their aircraft; the U.S. SBD Dauntless could be equipped with two gun pods on each wing, each with two M2 Browning machine guns.

The Bristol Blenheim Mk.1F of the Royal Air Force was a night fighter conversion of the twin engine light bomber equipped with airborne interception radar and armed with four .303 in (7.7 mm) Browning machine gun in a special gun pack under the fuselage. The Mk.IVF was a long range fighter version armed with the same gun pack.

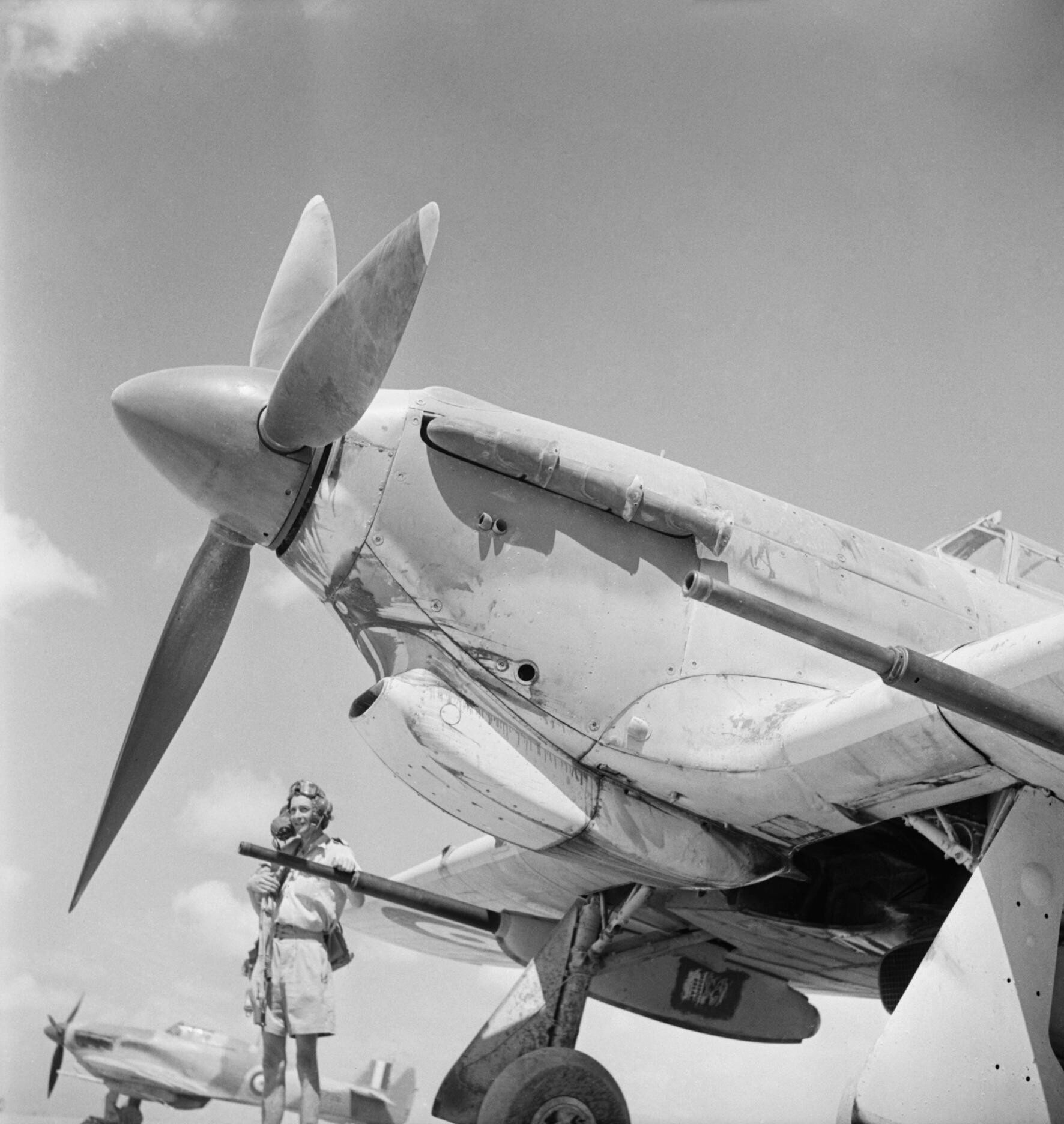
A Mark IID Hurricane of 6 Squadron at Shandur, Egypt (1942)

The RAF Hawker Hurricane Mk.IID of 1942 was an early and extremely successful example of tank busting aircraft of the North African campaign armed with two 40 mm (1.57 in) Vickers S gun with 15 rounds mounted in gondola-style pods, one under each wing.

Lessons learned during the Vietnam War showed the effectiveness of guns. Then, some expensive fighter jets such as the F-4 didn't even carry an internal cannon. Missiles (thought to be superior)—in particular radar-guided missiles—had notoriously poor combat track records in air-to-air combat. Engineers and air crews quickly created a solution by attaching rotary cannons in a cut-out fuel drop tank, creating an impromptu gun pod suitable for attacking ground targets.

Since the Vietnam War, United States Air Force policy has been that the use of multimillion-dollar aircraft for strafing is not economically justified, but the Soviet Union, and subsequently Russia, have remained proponents of strafing, and have continued to develop systems for this purpose.

Soviet experience in Afghanistan in the 1980s led to an unusual innovation in the form of the SPPU series of gun pods, which have traversable barrels allowing them to continue to fire on a fixed target as the aircraft passes overhead.

== Design ==
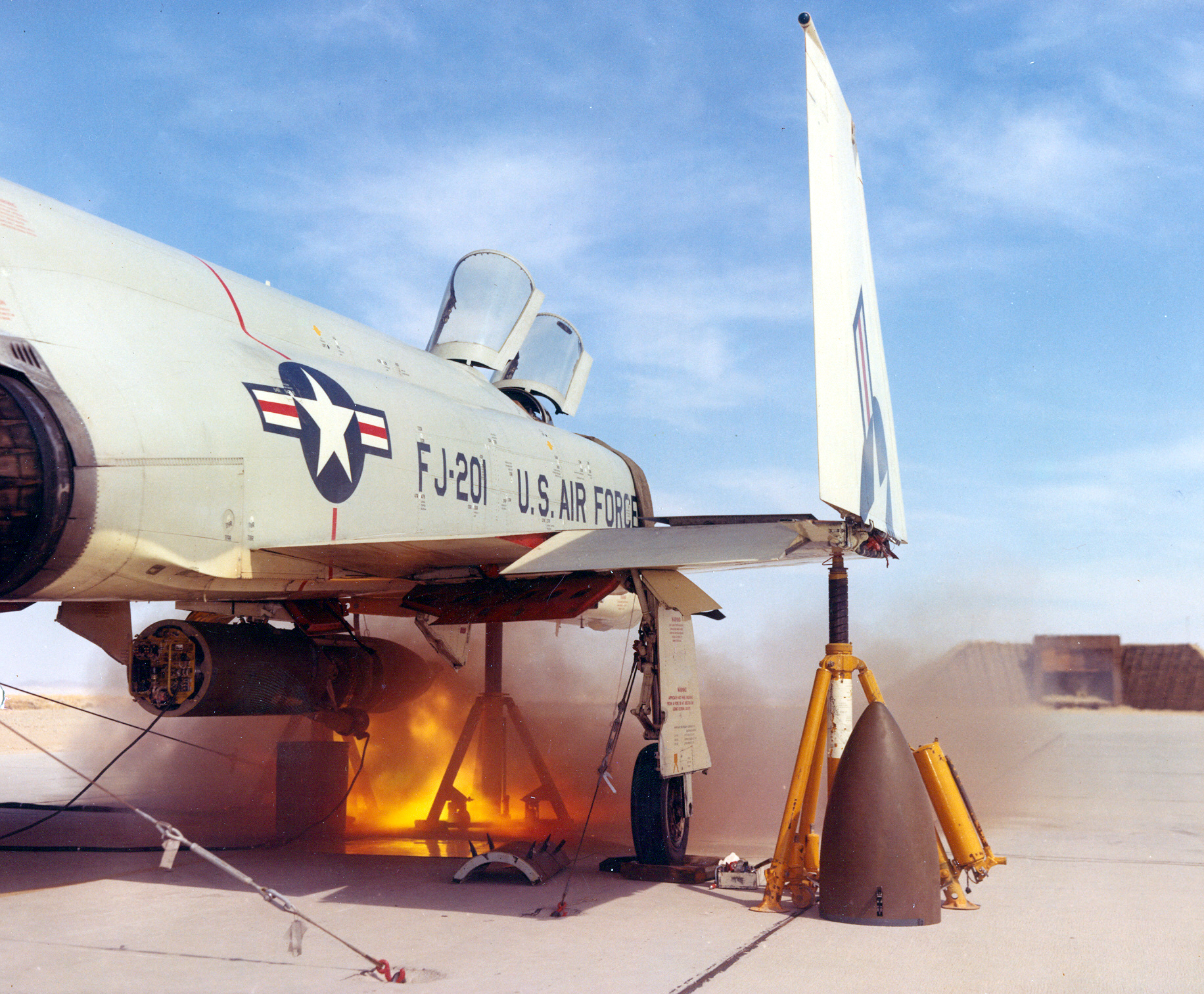
A gun pod being tested on an F-4 Phantom

A gun pod typically contains one or more guns, a supply of ammunition, and—if necessary—a power source. Electrically powered cannons, such as the M61 Vulcan, may be powered from the aircraft's electrical system or by a ram-air turbine.

Gun pods increase a vehicle's firepower without occupying internal volume. When not required for a specific mission they can be omitted to save weight. On some vehicles they isolate delicate internal components such as radar from the weapon's recoil and gases, and for jet aircraft allow the weapons to be mounted away from the intakes of the engines, reducing problems of gun-gas ingestion, which may cause the engine to stall.

When designed to be suspension-mounted on a hardpoint on a typical post-World War II aircraft, gun pods are inherently less accurate than integral guns, or the type of "conformal" gun pods that are faired smoothly into or onto the nearby surfaces of an aircraft, because the "hardpoint" mounting is necessarily less rigid, so that the weapon's recoil produces more deflection. This problem is particularly acute with more powerful cannons like the 30mm GPU-5 gun pod. Both hardpoint-mounted and conformal-mount gun pods also cause substantial drag on fast-moving vehicles such as fighter aircraft.

Gun pods are commonly carried on military helicopters, and are often fitted to light aircraft to equip them for counter-insurgency operations. Some air arms use gun pods for fighter bombers for use in strafing attacks.

== Examples ==
United States

- GPU-2/A: Gun pod with M197 cannon.
- GPU-5/A: Gun pod with GAU-13/A cannon.
- M18/SUU-11/A: Gun pod with M134/GAU-2/A machine gun.
- M12/SUU-16/A: Gun pod with M61A1 cannon.
- M25/SUU-23/A: Gun pod with GAU-4/A cannon.

USSR / Russia

- GUV-8700: Gun pod (9A624) 2 GShG 7.62mm / 9A622 and 1 Yak-B 12.7mm / 9A624
- GUV-8700: Gun pod (9A669), similar as above, 1 9A800 (version of AGS-17 30mm automatic grenade launcher) in the same pod.
- UPK-23-250: Gun pod GSh-23L twin barreled 23mm
- SPPU-22: Depressible gun pod GSh-23L twin barreled 23mm
- SPPU-6: Fully mobile gun pod GSh-6-23 six barreled 23mm
- SPPU-687: Depressible gun pod (9A-4273) GSh-30-1 high velocity 30mm (prototype)

France

- CC420: Gun pod with 30mm DEFA 552, 552A, 553, or 554 cannon.
- CC422: Short gun pod with 30mm DEFA 553 cannon.
- CC630: Gun pod with two 30mm DEFA 554 cannons.
