= AAI In-Line =

- Type: Multibarrel medium machine gun
- Place of origin: United States

Production history
- Designer: AAI Corporation

Specifications
- Cartridge: 7.62×51mm NATO
- Caliber: 7.62 mm (0.308 in)
- Barrels: 6
- Action: Electrically driven rotary breech
- Rate of fire: Variable, 2,000–6,000 rpm
- Feed system: Disintegrating M13 linked belt or linkless feed; dependent on installation [500–5,000 round belt]

The AAI In-Line was a prototype aircraft machine gun developed by AAI Corporation. The weapon was intended for potential aircraft use and capable of high rate of fire similar to the M134 Minigun but with the accuracy of a fixed barrel machine gun. The In-Line machine gun concept worked and passed air force tests but was not further developed. Around three of them were manufactured. The only known example is on display at the Air Force Armament Museum.

== Design ==
The AAI In-Line is an externally driven chain/crankshaft operated machine gun with six fixed barrels. The belt feed is unusual as it uses a synchronizer for every sixth round is to be chambered in each barrel. It is chambered in 7.62×51mm NATO.
