= M61 Vulcan =

20 mm Gatling-type rotary cannon

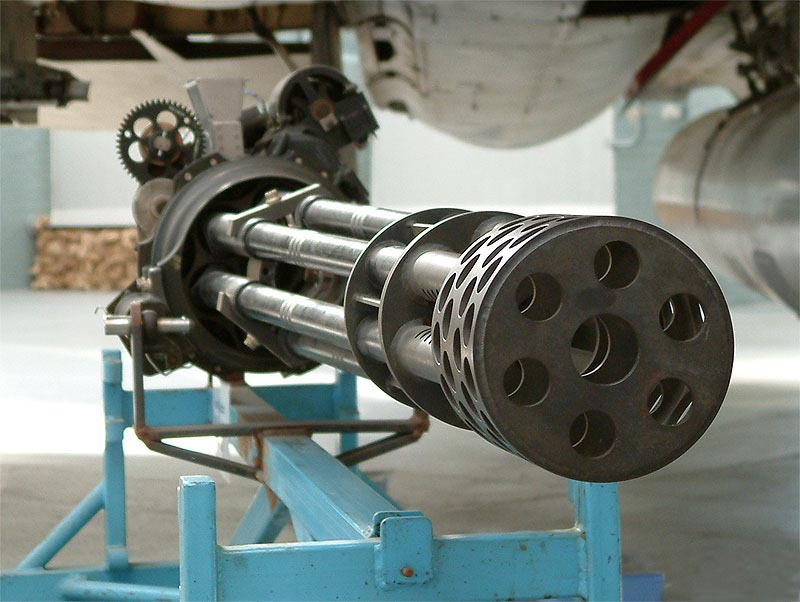
- An unmounted M61A1 Vulcan with flash suppressor used in the SUU-16/A gun pod
- Type: Rotary cannon
- Place of origin: United States

Service history
- In service: 1959–present
- Used by: United States, some NATO members, Japan, South Korea, Saudi Arabia, and others
- Wars: Vietnam War; Iran–Iraq War; Gulf War; War in Afghanistan; Iraq War; War in Iraq (2013–2017); Yemeni Civil War (2014–present); Saudi Arabian-led intervention in Yemen; Turkish military operation in Idlib Governorate; Russo-Ukrainian War

Production history
- Designer: General Electric
- Designed: 1946
- Manufacturer: General Dynamics; Sumitomo Heavy Industries; SNT Dynamics
- Variants: See below

Specifications
- Mass: M61A1: 248 lb (112 kg); M61A2: 202 lb (92 kg) (light barrel), 228 lb (103 kg) (heavy barrel)
- Length: 71.93 in (1.827 m)
- Barrel length: 59.8 in (1.52 m)
- Cartridge: 20×102mm Vulcan
- Caliber: 20 mm (0.8 in)
- Barrels: 6-barrel (progressive RH parabolic twist, 9 grooves)
- Action: Hydraulically operated, electrically fired, rotary cannon
- Rate of fire: 6,000 rounds per minute
- Muzzle velocity: 3,450 ft/s (1,050 m/s) with PGU-28/B round
- Effective firing range: About 9,842 ft (3,000 m)
- Feed system: Belt or linkless feed system

The M61 Vulcan is a hydraulically, electrically, or pneumatically driven, six-barrel, air-cooled, electrically fired Gatling-style rotary cannon which fires 20 mm caliber rounds at an extremely high rate (typically 6,000 rounds per minute). The M61 and its derivatives have been the principal cannon armament of fixed-wing aircraft of the United States Armed Forces since 1959.

Designed in 1946 by General Electric, the Vulcan entered service with the U.S. military in 1959. Since 2000, it has been manufactured by General Dynamics. It is also manufactured under license in Japan by Sumitomo Heavy Industries for the Japan Self-Defense Forces and by SNT Dynamics in South Korea.

== Development ==
At the end of World War II, the United States Army Air Forces began to consider new technology for guns mounted on its military aircraft. The higher speeds of jet-powered fighter aircraft meant that achieving an effective number of hits would be extremely difficult without a much higher volume of fire. While captured German designs (principally the Mauser MG 213C) showed the potential of the single-barrel revolver cannon, the practical rate of fire of such a design was still limited by ammunition feed and barrel wear concerns. The US wanted something more advanced, combining an extremely high rate of fire with exceptional reliability.

In 1947, the United States Air Force became a separate branch of the US military, and it made a formal request for a new aircraft gun. A lesson of World War II air combat was that German, Italian, and Japanese fighters with center-line-mounted weapons could attack American aircraft from long range with their main armament. American fighters with .50 caliber (12.7 mm) main armament, such as the P-51 and P-47, had to be close to enemy aircraft in order to cause significant damage to strong parts deep inside the jet. The 20 mm (0.79 in) Hispano cannon carried by the P-38 and P-61, while formidable against propeller-driven planes, had a relatively low rate of fire in the age of jets, while other Allied cannons were notoriously unreliable.

In response to this requirement, the Armament Division of General Electric resurrected an old idea: the multi-barrel Gatling gun. The original Gatling gun had fallen out of favor because of the need for an external power source to rotate the barrel assembly, but the new generation of turbojet-powered fighters offered sufficient electric power to operate the gun, and electric operation was more reliable than gas-operated reloading.

With multiple barrels, the rate of fire per barrel could be lower than a single-barrel revolver cannon while providing a greater overall rate of fire. The idea of powering a Gatling gun from an external electric power source was not a novel idea at the end of World War II, as Richard Jordan Gatling had done just that with a patent he filed in 1893.

In 1946, the Army issued General Electric a contract for "Project Vulcan", a six-barrel weapon capable of firing 7,200 rounds per minute (rpm). Although European designers were moving towards heavier 30 mm (1.181 in) weapons for better hitting power, the U.S. initially concentrated on a powerful 0.60-inch (15 mm) caliber cartridge designed for a pre-war anti-tank rifle, expecting that the cartridge's high muzzle velocity would be beneficial for improving hit ratios on high-speed targets. The first GE prototypes of the 0.60-inch (15 mm) caliber T45 were ground-fired in 1949; it achieved 2,500 rpm, which was increased to 4,000 rpm by 1950. Due to air combat experience in the Korean War, the USAF decided that high velocity alone might not be sufficient to ensure target destruction and tested 20 and 27 mm (0.787 and 1.06 in) alternatives based on the 0.60-inch (15 mm) caliber cartridge. These variants of the T45 were known as the T171 and T150 respectively and were first tested in 1952. Eventually, the standard 20×102 mm cartridge was determined to have the desired balance of projectile/explosive mass and muzzle velocity, resulting in an optimum balance of range, accuracy and kinetic energy on target.

The development of the Lockheed F-104 Starfighter revealed that the T171 Vulcan (later redesignated M61) suffered problems with its linked ammunition, being prone to misfeed and presenting a foreign object damage hazard with discarded links. A linkless ammunition feed system was developed for the upgraded M61A1, which subsequently became the standard cannon armament of U.S. fighters.

In 1993, General Electric sold its aerospace division, including GE Armament Systems along with the design and production tooling for the M61 and GE's other rotary cannon, to Martin Marietta. After Martin's merger with Lockheed, the rotary cannon became the responsibility of Lockheed Martin Armament Systems. Lockheed Martin Armament Systems was later acquired by General Dynamics, which produces the M61 and its variants as of 2000.

== Description ==
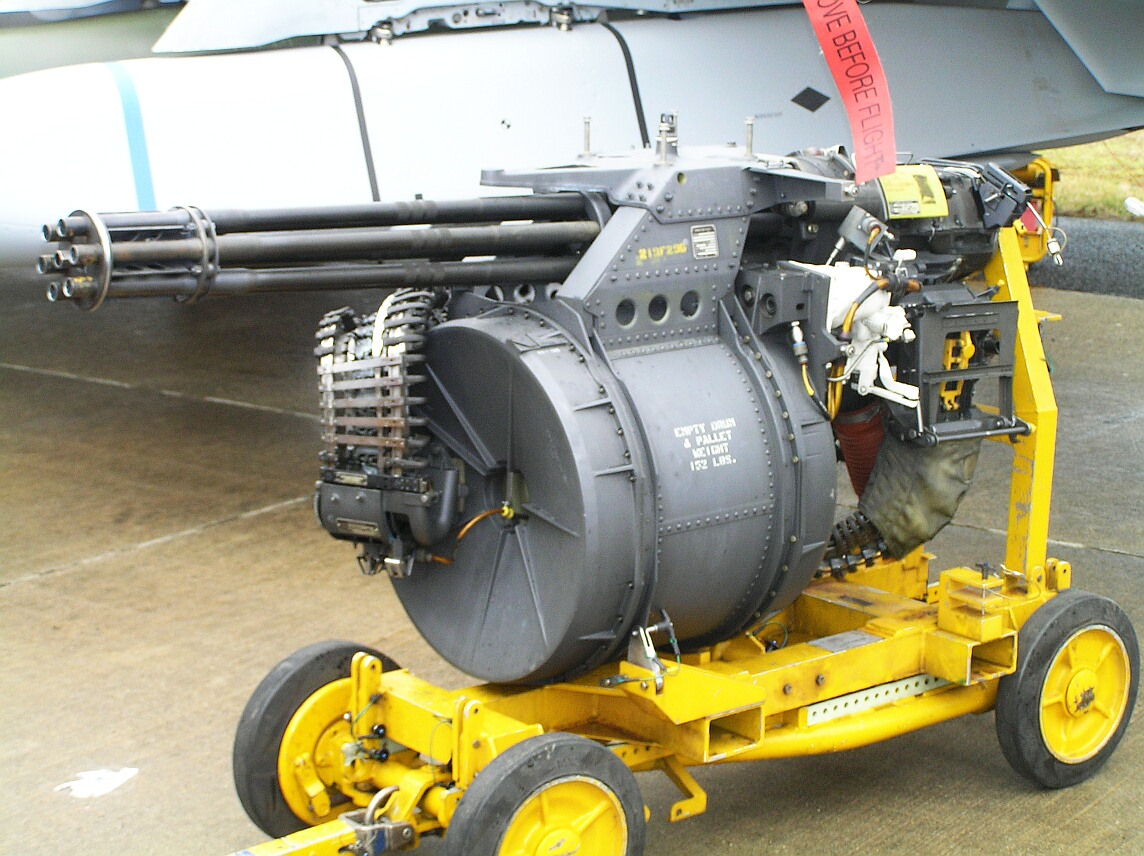
An M61A1 Vulcan and the feed system for an F/A-18, on a stand

Each of the cannon's six barrels fires once in turn during each revolution of the barrel cluster. The multiple barrels provide both a very high rate of fire—around 100 rounds per second—and contribute to prolonged weapon life by minimizing barrel erosion and heat generation. The average time between jams or failures is in excess of 10,000 rounds, making it an extremely reliable weapon. The success of the Vulcan Project and its progeny, the very-high-speed Gatling gun, has led to guns of the same configuration being referred to as "Vulcan cannons", which can sometimes confuse nomenclature on the subject.

Most aircraft versions of the M61 are hydraulically driven and primed electrically. The gun rotor, barrel assembly and ammunition feed system are rotated by a hydraulic drive motor through a system of flexible drive shafts. The round is fired by an electric priming system where an electric current from a firing lead passes through the firing pin to the primer as each round is rotated into the firing position.

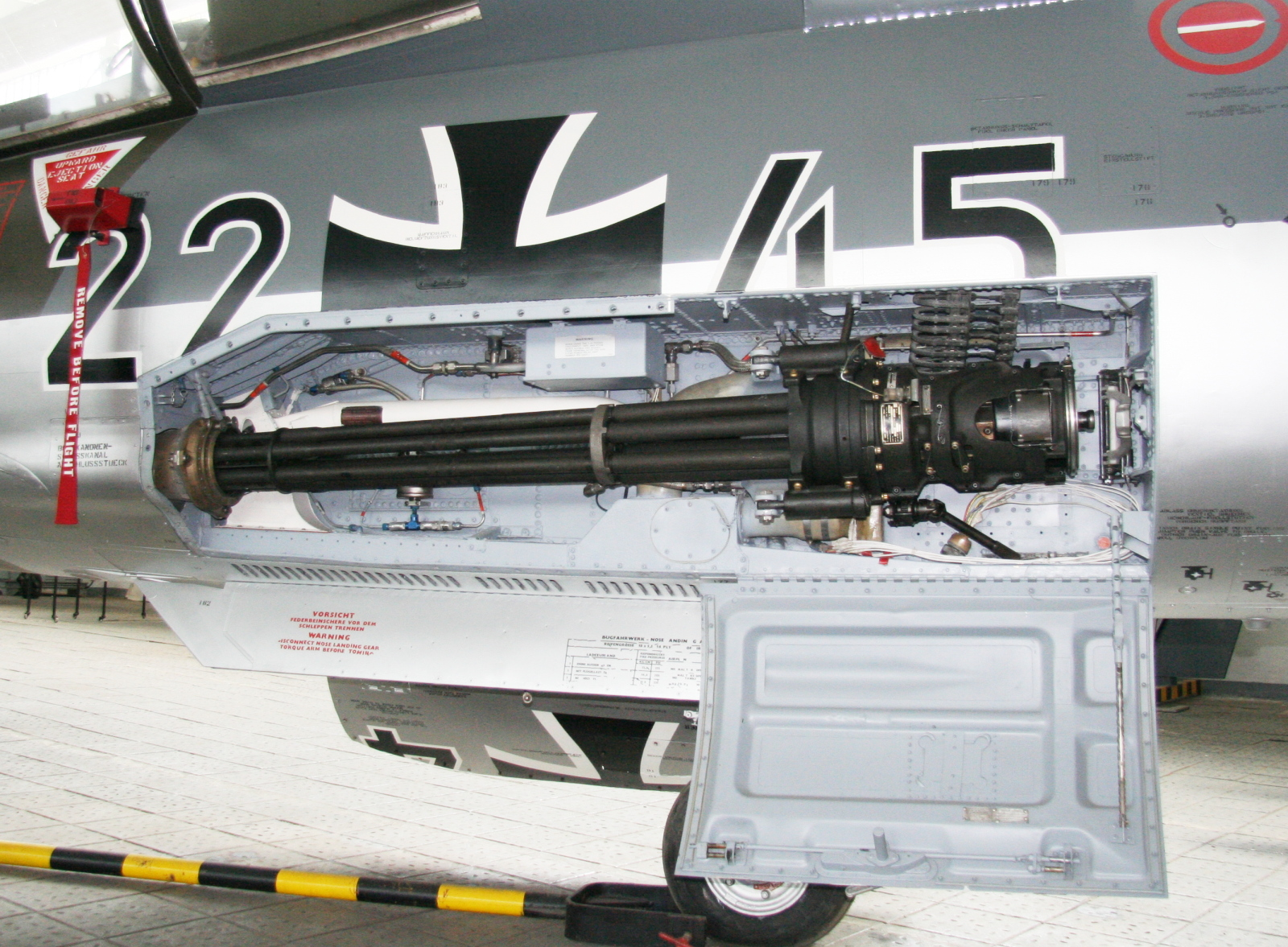
Gun installation on West German F-104.

The self-powered version, the GAU-4 (called M130 in Army service), is gas-operated, tapping gun gas from three of the six barrels to operate the gun gas-driven mechanism. The self-powered Vulcan weighs about 4.5 kilograms (10 lb) more than its electric counterpart, but requires no external power source to operate, except for an electric inertia starter to initiate gun rotation, allowing the first rounds to be chambered and fired.

The initial M61 used linked ammunition, but the ejection of spent links created considerable (and ultimately insuperable) problems. The original weapon was soon replaced by the M61A1, with a linkless feed system. Depending on the application, the feed system can be either single-ended (ejecting spent cases and unfired rounds) or double-ended (returning casings back to the magazine). A disadvantage of the M61 is that the bulk of the weapon, its feed system, and ammunition drum make it difficult to fit it into a densely packed airframe.

De-classified Tactical Weapons Effects Tests of the U.S. Air-Force Century-Series aircraft.

The feed system must be custom-designed for each application, adding 140 to 180 kg (300 to 400 lb) to the complete weapon. Most aircraft installations are double-ended, because the ejection of empty cartridges can cause a foreign-object damage hazard for jet engines and because the retention of spent cases assists in maintaining the center of gravity of the aircraft. The first aircraft to carry the M61A1 was the C model of the F-104, starting in 1959.

A lighter version of the Vulcan developed for use on the F-22 Raptor, designated M61A2, is mechanically the same as the M61A1, but with thinner barrels to reduce overall weight to 92 kilograms (202 lb). The rotor and housing have also been modified to remove any piece of metal not absolutely needed for operation and replaces some metal components with lighter-weight materials. The F/A-18E/F Super Hornet also uses this version.

The Vulcan's rate of fire is typically 6,000 rounds per minute, although some versions (such as that of the AMX and the F-106 Delta Dart) are limited to a lower rate, and others (A-7 Corsair, F-15 Eagle) have a selectable rate of fire of either 4,000 or 6,000 rounds per minute. The M61A2's lighter barrels allow a somewhat higher rate of fire, up to 6,600 rounds per minute.

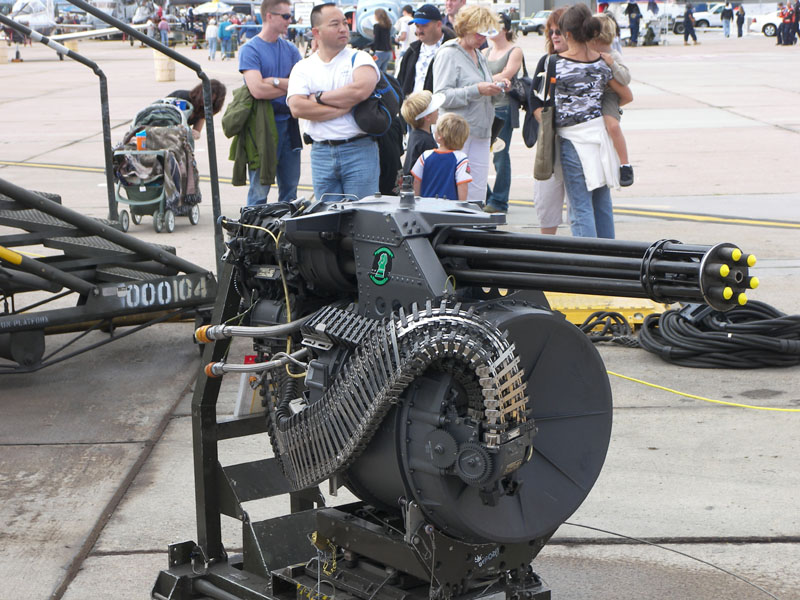
An M61A1 Vulcan at the Miramar Airshow

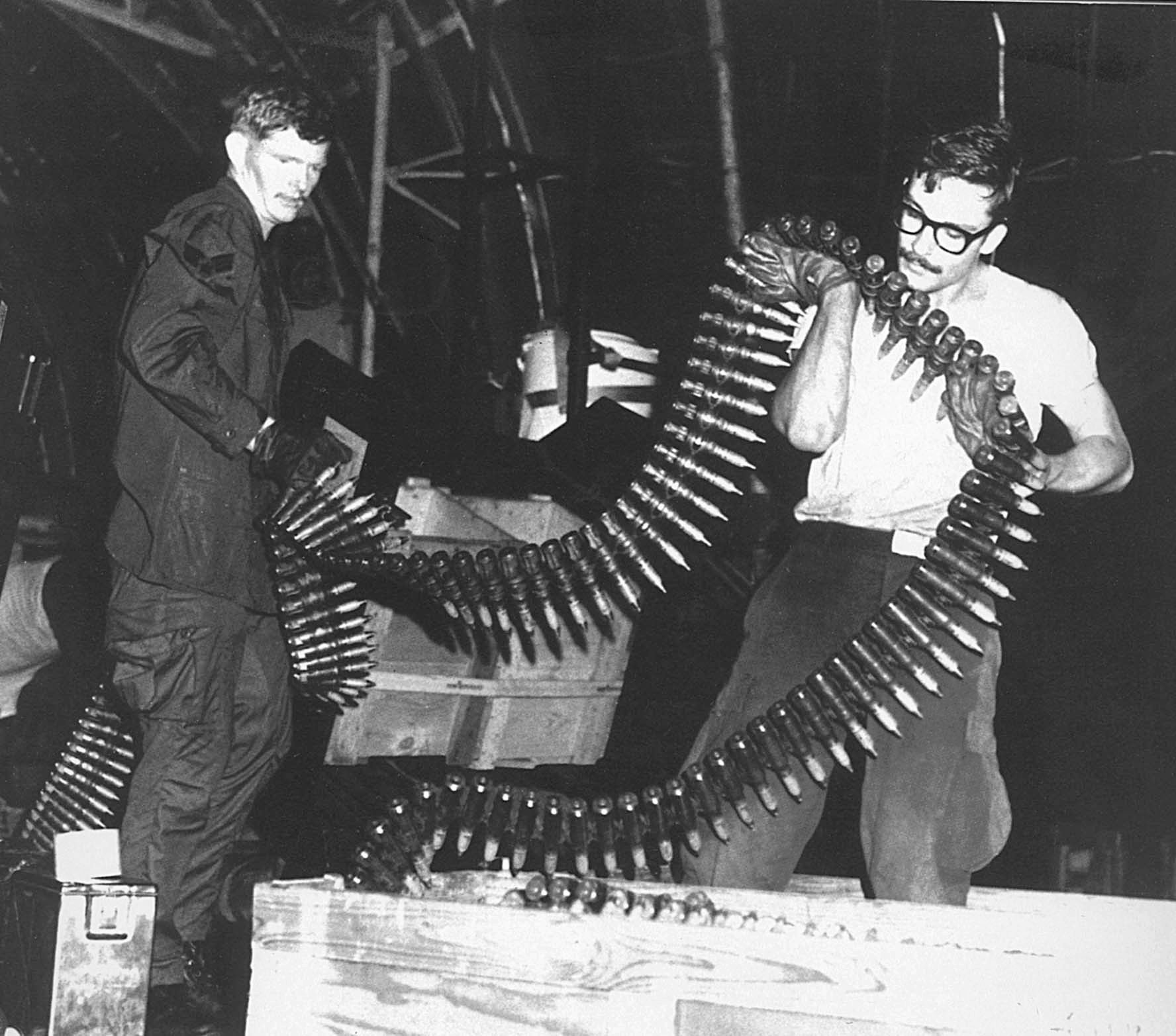
An M61 ammunition belt

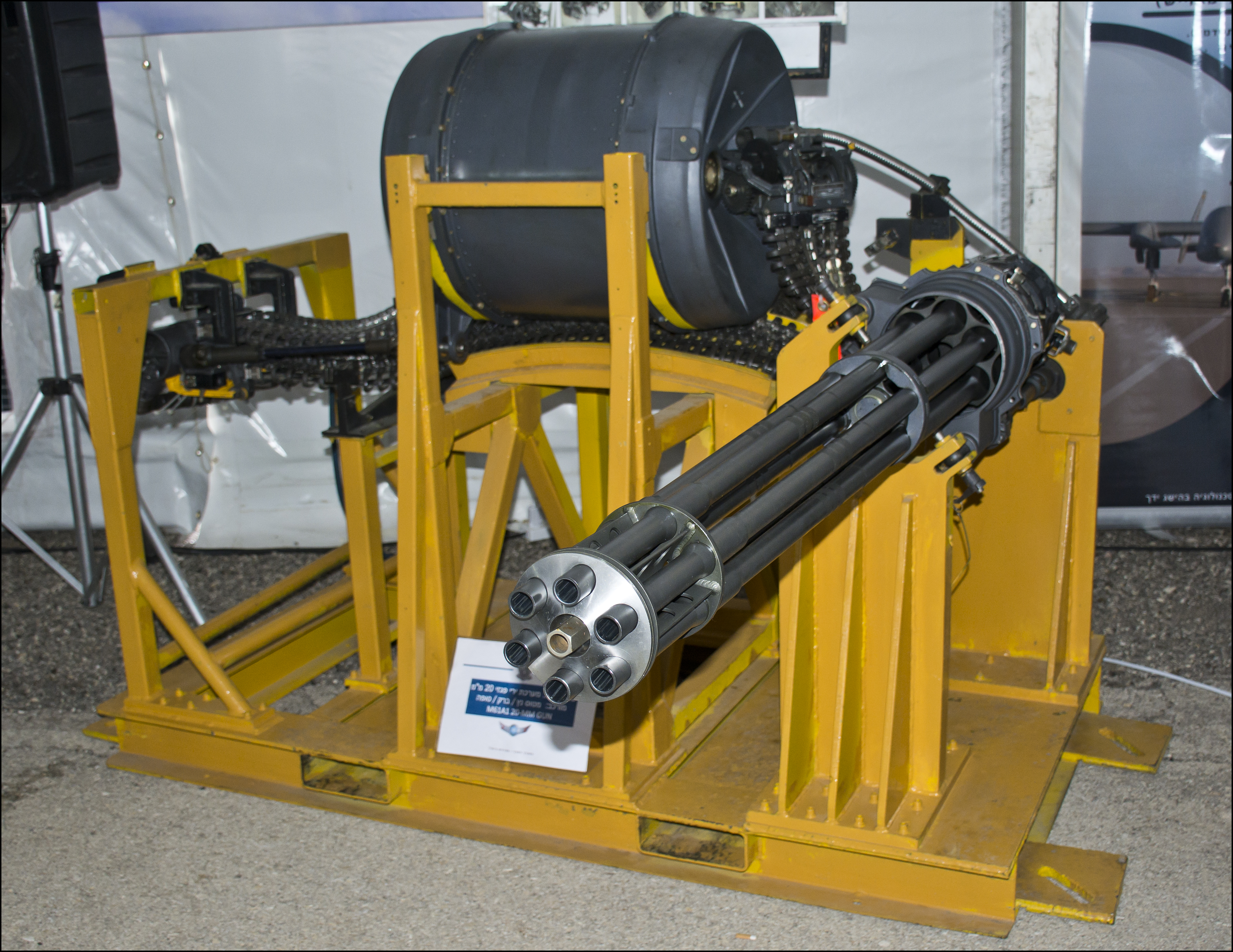
M61A1 on display

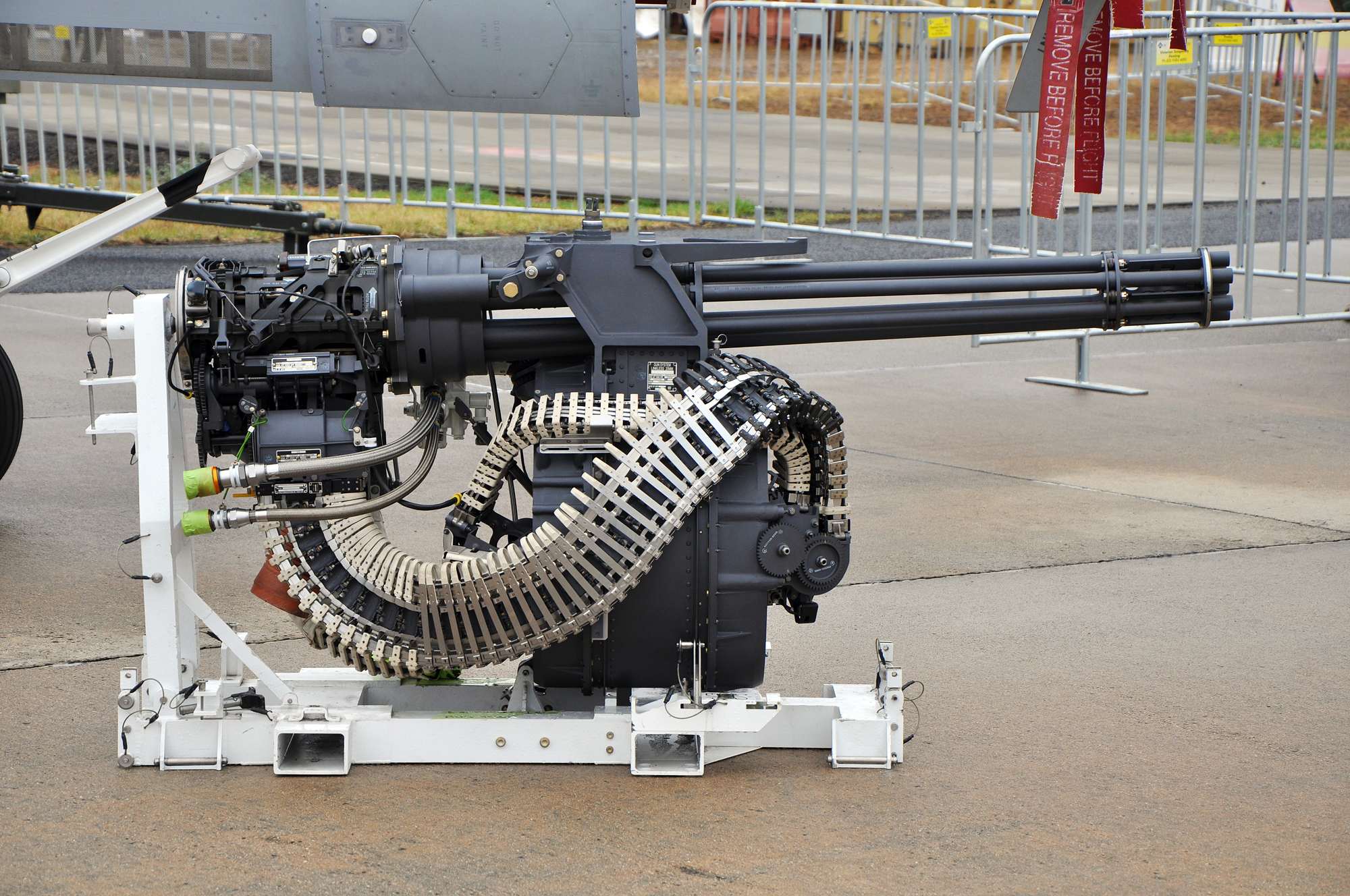
M61A1 Vulcan on display

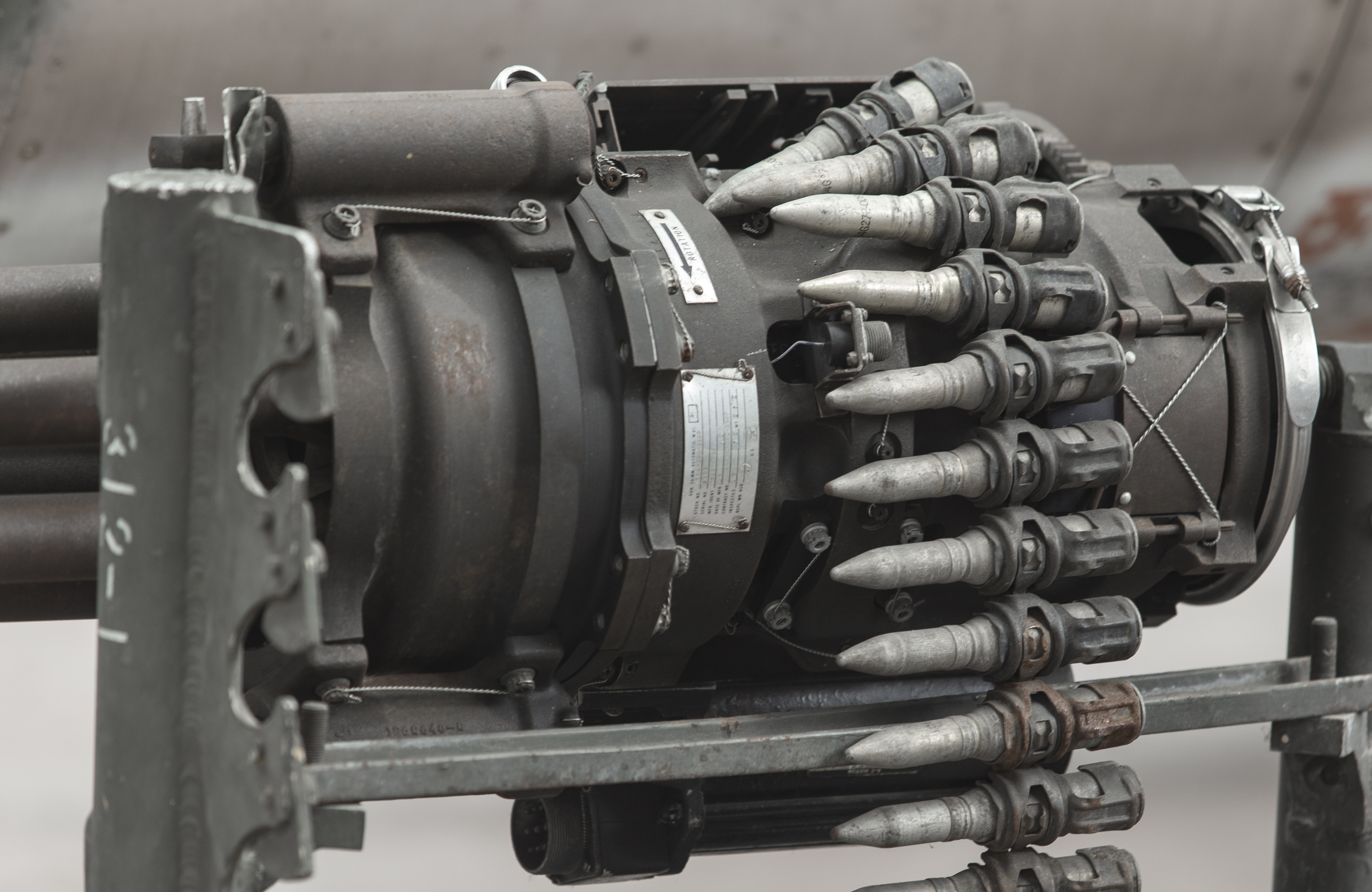
M51A2 Dummy rounds, Brussels 2015

=== Ammunition ===
Until the late 1980s, the M61 primarily used the M50 series of ammunition, which includes armor-piercing incendiary, high-explosive incendiary, and training rounds. The gun typically fires a 99-gram (3.5 oz) projectile at a muzzle velocity of about 1,030 metres per second (3,380 ft/s).

A new PGU-28/B round was developed in the mid-1980s: a semi-armor-piercing high-explosive incendiary (SAPHEI) round, providing improvements in range, accuracy, and power over the preceding M56A3 HEI round. The PGU-28/B is a "low-drag" round designed to reduce in-flight drag and deceleration, and has a slightly increased muzzle velocity of 1,050 metres per second (3,450 ft/s). However, the PGU-28/B has not been without problems. A 2000 USAF safety report noted 24 premature detonation mishaps (causing serious damage in many cases) in 12 years with the SAPHEI round, compared to only two such mishaps in the entire recorded history of the M56 round. The report estimated that the PGU-28/B had a potential failure rate 80 times higher than USAF standards permit. Due to safety issues, it was limited to emergency wartime use in 2000.

Practically no powered rotary cannon is supplied with sufficient ammunition for a full minute of firing, due to weight (at 6,000 rpm, the projectiles alone would represent a mass of about 600 kg (1,300 lb) for one minute of firing; and by including the brass shell, filling and primer the weight is approximately double that at 1,225 kg (2,701 lb)). In order to avoid using 600 to 1,000 rounds carried by aircraft all at once, a burst controller is generally used to limit the number of rounds fired at each trigger pull. Bursts from two or three up to 40 or 50 can be selected. The size of the airframe and available internal space limits the size of the ammunition drum and thus the ammunition capacity. When vehicle-mounted, the only limiting factor is the vehicle's safe carry weight, so commensurately larger ammo storage is available.

The main types of combat rounds include:

Designation	Type	Projectile weight [grains]	Bursting charge [grains]	Muzzle velocity [m/s]	Description
M53	API	?	65 gr (4.2 g; 0.15 oz) incendiary	1,030	6.4 mm (0.25 in) RHA penetration at 0 degree impact angle and 1,000 m (3,300 ft) range.
M56A3/A4	HEI	1,543 gr (100.0 g; 3.5 oz)	165 gr (10.7 g; 0.38 oz) HE and 20 gr (1.3 g; 0.046 oz) incendiary	1,030	Nose fuzed round, no tracer. 2 m (6.6 ft) effective radius to produce casualties to exposed personnel. Fragmentation hazard out to 20 m (66 ft). 12.7 mm (0.50 in) RHA penetration at 0 degree obliquity at 104 m (341 ft) range.
PGU-28A/B	SAPHEI	1,580 gr (102.4 g; 3.6 oz)	150 gr; 0.35 oz (10 g)	1,050	Multi-purpose fuzeless round with an incendiary charge in the nose setting off the HE behind it with a slight delay to maximize lethality against aircraft. No tracer or self-destruct. A zirconium pellet at the bottom of the HE cavity provides additional incendiary effect.

== Applications and first combat use ==
M61A1 Vulcan firing test aboard an F-105 Thunderchief.

The Vulcan was first used in aerial combat on 4 April 1965, when four North Vietnamese Vietnam People's Air Force (VPAF) MiG-17s attacked a force of 10 North American F-100 Super Sabres (two of which were assigned weather reconnaissance duties) escorting 48 Vulcan-armed and "bomb-laden" F-105 Thunderchiefs, shooting down two of the latter. The MiG leader and only survivor from the four MiGs, Captain Tran Hanh, reported that U.S. jets had pursued them and that F-105s had shot down three of his aircraft, killing lieutenants Pham Giay, Le Minh Huan and Tran Nguyen Nam. Captain Donald Kilgus, piloting an F-100, received an official probable kill with his four M39 20 mm cannons during the engagement; however no other US pilot reported destroying any MiGs during the battle, leaving open the possibility that at least two of the MiG-17s may have been downed by their own anti-aircraft fire.

The first confirmed Vulcan gun kill occurred on 29 June 1966 when Major Fred Tracy, flying his F-105 with the 421st TFS, fired 200 rounds of 20 mm into a MiG-17 that had just fired a 23 mm shell which entered one side of his cockpit and exited the other. When the VPAF MiG flew in front of him after making its pass, Tracy opened fire on it.

The gun was installed in the Air Force's A-7D version of the LTV A-7 Corsair II where it replaced the earlier United States Navy A-7's Colt Mk 12 cannon and was adopted by the Navy on the A-7C and A-7E. It was integrated into the newer F-4E Phantom II variants. The F-4 was originally designed without a cannon as it was believed that missiles had made guns obsolete. Combat experience in Vietnam showed that a gun could be more effective than guided missiles in many combat situations and that an externally carried gun pod was less effective than an internal gun; the first generation of gun pods such as the SUU-16 were not oriented with the sights of the fighter. The improved pods were self-powered and properly synchronized to the sights, while the USAF versions of the F-4 were hastily fitted with internal M61 cannons in a prominent fairing under the nose, well before the war ended (Navy Phantoms never received cannons, continuing to rely on air-to-air missiles alone). The next generation of fighters built post-Vietnam incorporated the M61 gun internally.

Combat kills using the M61 Vulcan in the Vietnam War 1966–1972
Date/year	Firing aircraft	M61 Vulcan variant	Aircraft downed		USAF unit/comments
29 June 1966	F-105D Thunderchief	M61A1	MiG-17		421st Tactical Fighter Squadron
18 August 1966	F-105D	M61A1	MiG-17		34th TFS
21 September 1966	F-105D	M61A1	MiG-17		333rd TFS
21 September 1966	F-105D	M61A1	MiG-17		421st TFS
4 December 1966	F-105D	M61A1	MiG-17		469th TFS
1967	F-105D/F-105F	M61A1	(5) MiG-17		333rd TFS
1967	F-105D	M61A1	(8) MiG-17		354th TFS
1967	F-105D/F-105F	M61A1	(4) MiG-17		357th TFS
1967	F-4C Phantom II	SUU-16 gunpod	(2) MiG-17		480th TFS
13 May 1967	F-105D	M61A1	MiG-17		44th TFS
3 June 1967	F-105D	M61A1	MiG-17		13th TFS: Captain Ralph Kuster
23 August 1967	F-105D	M61A1	MiG-17		34th TFS
24 October 1967	F-4D	SUU-23 gunpod	MiG-21		433rd TFS
1967	F-4D	SUU-23	(3) MiG-17		435th TFS
3 January 1968	F-4D	SUU-23	MiG-17		433rd TFS; pilot, Major B J Bogoslofski, WSO, Captain Richard L Huskey
14 February 1968	F-4D	SUU-23	MiG-17		555th TFS
1972	F-4E	M61A1	(3) MiG-21		35th TFS; the F4E was the first Phantom II to enter the war with an internal Vulcan gun.
2 June 1972	F-4E	M61A1	MiG-19		58th TFS; first kill at supersonic speed (Mach 1.2); Major Phil Handley/WSO 1LT J. J. Smallwood
9 September 1972	F-4E	M61A1	MiG-21		555th TFS
15 October 1972	F-4E	M61A1	MiG-21		307th TFS
			Total MiG-17	32	
			Total MiG-19	1	
			Total MiG-21	6	
			Total	39	

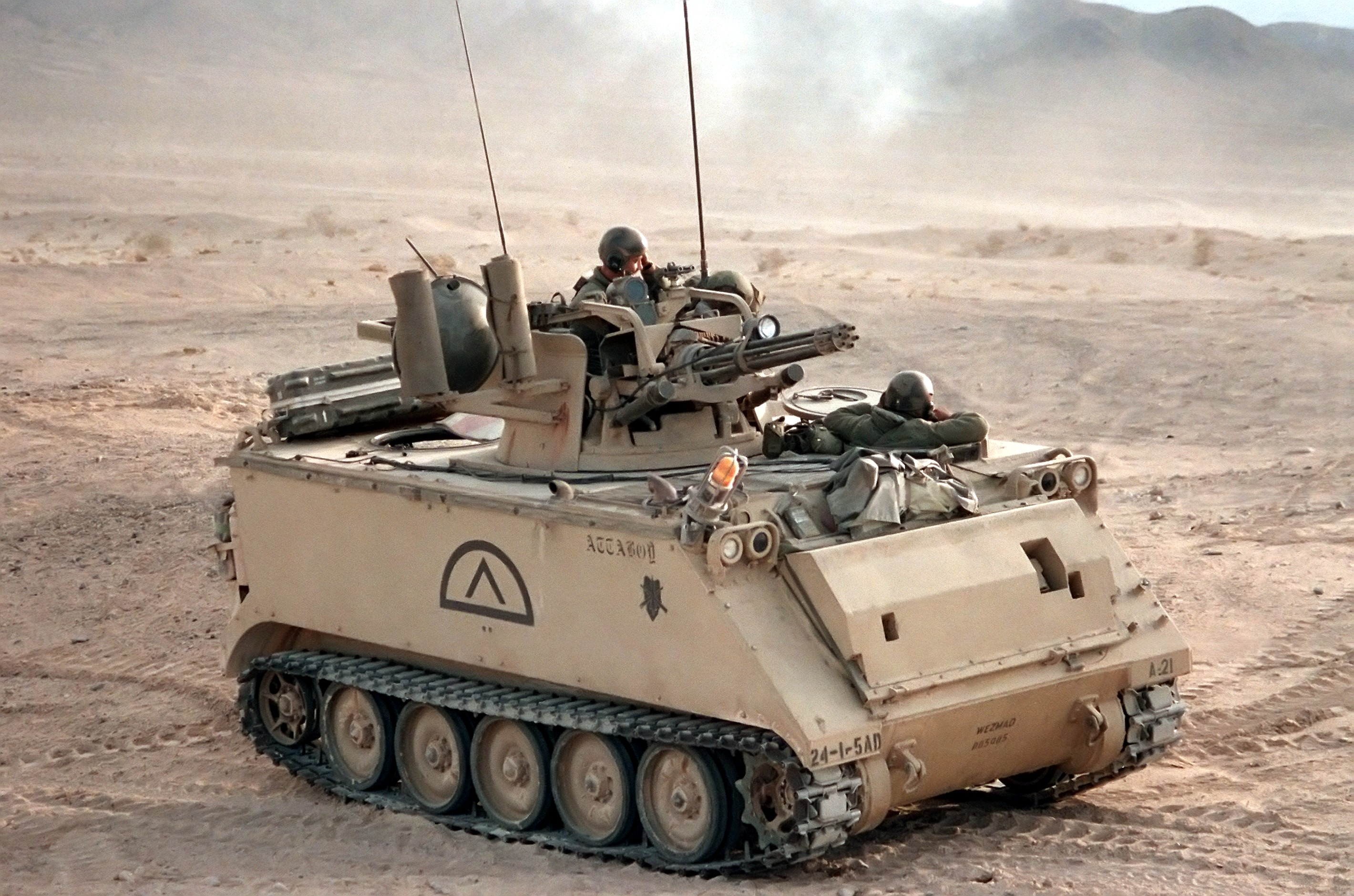
An M61 mounted on a US Army M163 armored vehicle.

The Vulcan was later fitted into the weapons bay of some Convair F-106 Delta Dart and General Dynamics F-111 Aardvark models. It was also adopted as standard in the "teen"-series air superiority fighters: the Grumman F-14 Tomcat, the McDonnell Douglas F-15 Eagle, General Dynamics F-16 Fighting Falcon, and McDonnell Douglas F/A-18 Hornet. Other aircraft include the Italian/Brazilian AMX International AMX (on Italian aircraft only), and the F-22 Raptor. It was fitted in a side-firing installation on the Fairchild AC-119 and some marks of the Lockheed AC-130 gunships, and was used in the tail turrets of both the Convair B-58 Hustler and Boeing B-52H Stratofortress bombers. (Note: The B-52 Vulcans were removed in 1991.) Japan's Mitsubishi F-1 carried one internally mounted JM61A1 Vulcan with 750 rounds.

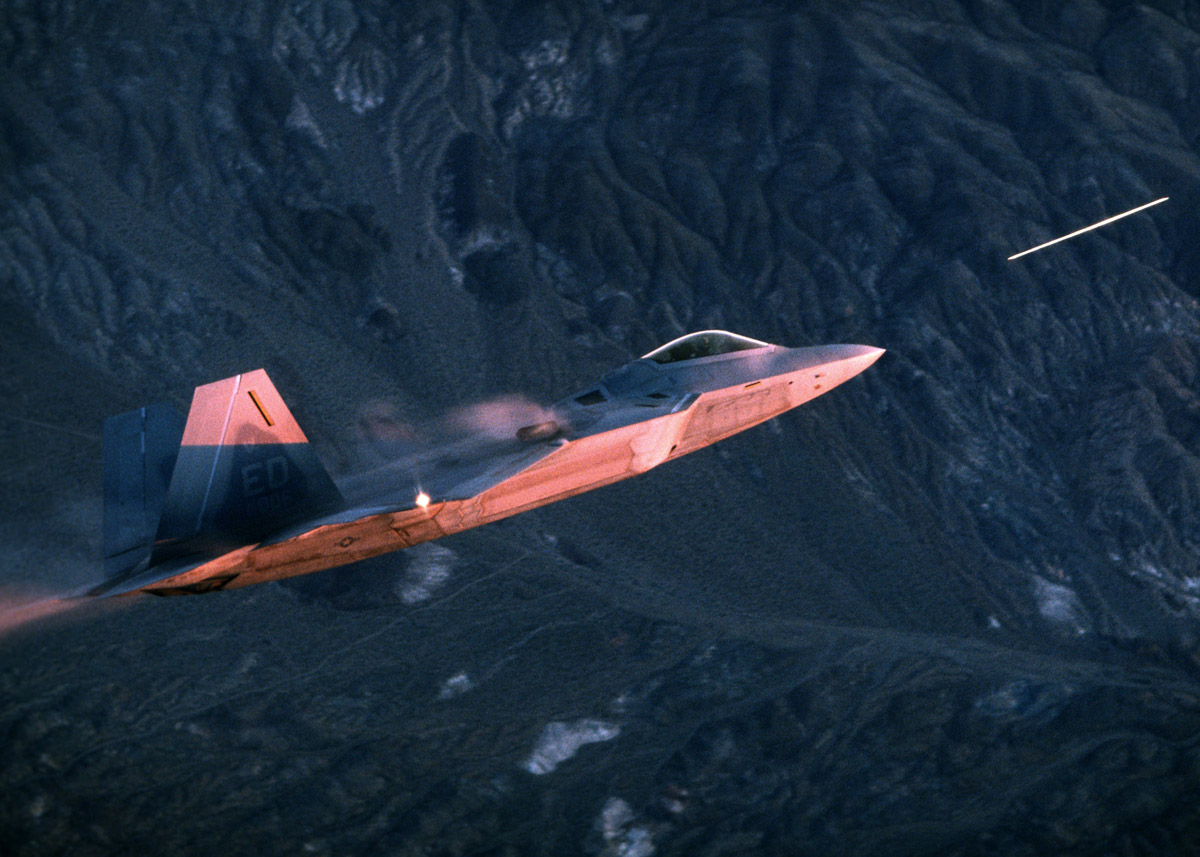
An F-22 firing its M61A2 rotary cannon

Two gun pod versions, the SUU-16/A (also designated M12 by the US Army) and improved SUU-23/A (US Army M25), were developed in the 1960s, often used on gunless versions of the F-4. The SUU-16/A uses the electric M61A1 with a ram-air turbine to power the motor. This proved to cause serious aerodynamic drag at higher speeds, while speeds under 640 kilometres per hour (400 mph) did not provide enough airflow for the maximum rate of fire.

The subsequent SUU-23/A uses the GAU-4/A self-powered Vulcan, with an electric inertia starter to bring it up to speed. Both pods ejected empty cases and unfired rounds rather than retaining them. Both pods contained 1,200 rounds of ammunition, with a loaded weight of 733 and 780 kilograms (1,615 and 1,720 lb) respectively. During service in the Vietnam War, the pods proved to be relatively inaccurate: the pylon mounting was not rigid enough to prevent deflection when firing, and repeated use would misalign the pod on its pylon, making matters worse.

A variant with much shorter barrels, designated the M195, was also developed for use on the M35 Armament Subsystem as used on the AH-1G Cobra helicopter. This variant fed from ammunition boxes fitted to the landing skid and was developed to provide the AH-1 helicopter with a longer-range suppressive fire system before the adoption of the M97 universal turret mounting the M197 cannon.

The M61 is also the basis of the US Navy Mk 15 Phalanx close-in weapon system and the M163 VADS Vulcan Air Defense System, using the M168 variant.

On 13 December 2024, the Ukrainian Air Force claimed an F-16 shot down six Russian cruise missiles in one sortie. Two were shot down with “medium-range missiles”, another two with “short-range missiles” and finally two with the M61 Vulcan 20 mm cannon. The pilot wasn't identified for security reasons but said: "A few bursts from the cannon – and an explosion... then another one! 'A secondary detonation,' I thought, but, as it turned out, there were two missiles".

On 20 August 2026, a Romanian Air Force F-16 destroyed an explosive naval drone near the Neptun Deep offshore platform using the onboard cannon. The drone was confirmed to not be Ukrainian as in the past incidents and the incident was attributed to Russia.

On 6 November 2026, at the International Fighter Conference 2026 in Munich, it was claimed that an Ukrainian F-16 pilot shot down 8 Russian attack drones, solely using his fighter’s 20 mm M61A1 Vulcan cannon with 100 of his original 400 rounds remaining. A few days later, the pilot, who is with the 107th Separate Aviation Wing, shot down nine drones again with some 80 rounds remaining. The exact date of the sorties are unknown.

== Variants ==
- M61A1
- M61A2 – The M61A2 shares the same features as the M61A1 but is 20% lighter.

== See also ==
- GAU-12 Equalizer – General Electric, 25 mm caliber
- GAU-13 – General Electric, 30 mm caliber
- GAU-19 – General Electric, 12.7×99 mm caliber
- GAU-22 – General Dynamics, 25 mm caliber, 4-barrel version of the GAU-12 mounted internally in the F-35A and in external gun pods on the F-35B and F-35C
- GAU-8 Avenger – General Electric, 30 mm caliber
- M134 Minigun – 7.62 mm cannon
- M163 VADS – self-propelled version of the M167 on an M113 armored personnel carrier
- M167 VADS – air defense system using the M61 Vulcan
- Machbet – Israeli upgrade of the M163 VADS incorporating the M61 Vulcan and four FIM-92 Stinger surface-to-air missile launch tubes
- XM301 – cancelled lightweight 20 mm cannon

Soviet Union/Russian Federation/CIS

- Gryazev-Shipunov GSh-6-23 – 23 mm caliber
- Gryazev-Shipunov GSh-30-1 – 30 mm caliber
- Gryazev-Shipunov GSh-6-30 – 30 mm caliber
- Gryazev-Shipunov GSh-30-2 – 30 mm caliber
- GShG-7.62 machine gun – 7.62 mm caliber
- YakB-12.7 machine gun – 12.7 mm caliber
- Shipunov 2A42 – 30 mm caliber autocannon

== Bibliography ==
- Anderton, David A. (1987). North American F-100 Super Sabre. Osprey Publishing. ISBN 978-0-85045-662-2.
- Campbell, John M.; Hill, Michael (1996). Roll Call: Thud: A Photographic Record of the F-105 Thunderchief. Schiffer Publishing. ISBN 0-7643-0062-8.
- Davies, Peter E. (2004). U.S. Air Force F-4 Phantom II MiG Killers 1965–68. Osprey Combat Aircraft. UK: Osprey Publishing. ISBN 1-84176-656-9.
- Davies, Peter E. (2005). USAF F-4 Phantom II MiG Killers 1972–73. Osprey Combat Aircraft. Osprey Publishing. ISBN 1-84176-657-7.
- Hobson, Chris (2001). Vietnam Air Losses, United States Air Force, Navy and Marine Corps Fixed-Wing Aircraft Losses in Southeast Asia 1961–1973. Midland Publishing. ISBN 1-85780-115-6.
- McCarthy, Donald J., Jr. (2009). MiG Killers, A Chronology of U.S. Air Victories in the Vietnam War 1965–1973. Specialty Press. ISBN 978-1-58007-136-9.
- Michel, Marshall L., III (1997). Clashes, Air Combat Over North Vietnam 1965–1972. Naval Institute Press. ISBN 978-1-59114-519-6.
- Toperczer, Istvan (2008). MiG-17 and MiG-19 Units of the Vietnam War. Osprey Combat Aircraft (2nd ed.). Osprey Publishing. ISBN 978-1-84176-162-6.
