= Machbet =

Self-propelled anti-aircraft gun, upgrade of the Hovet

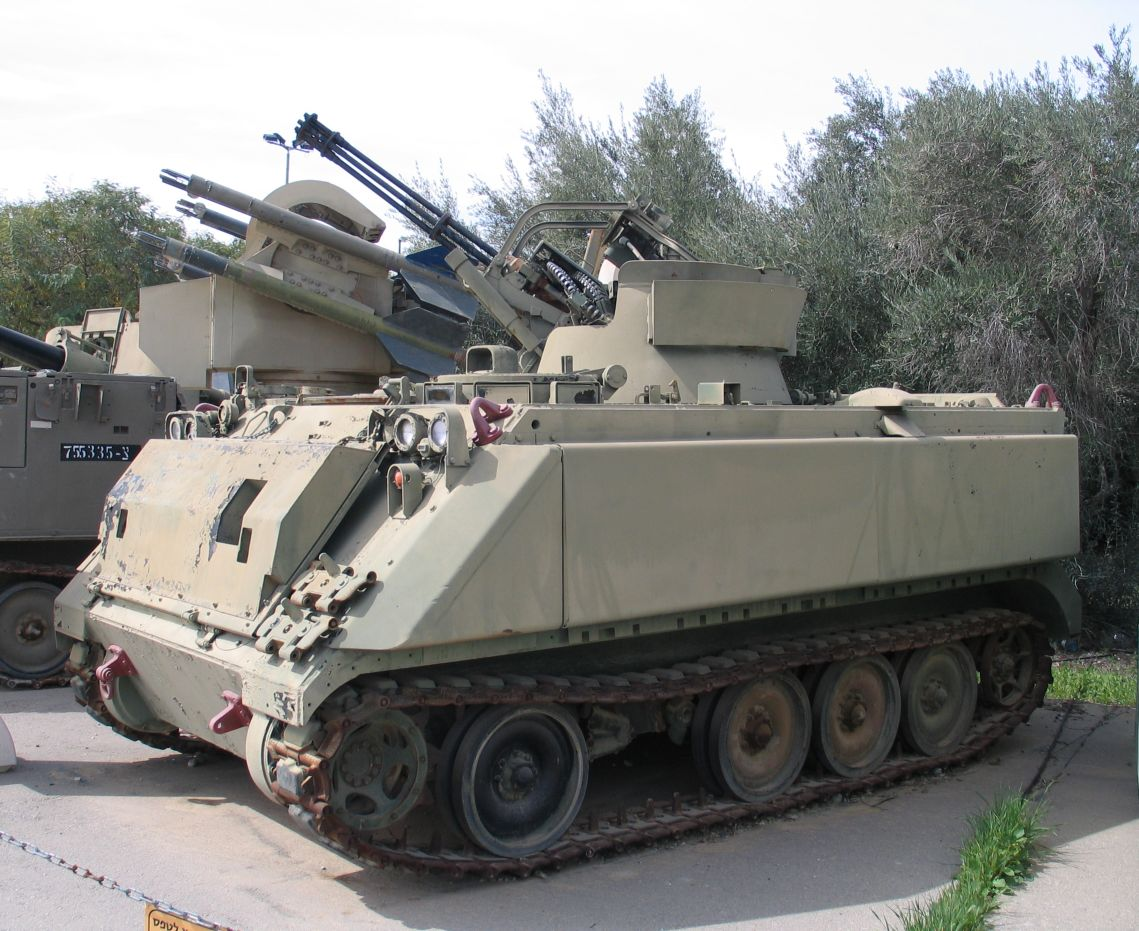
- A Hovet, the predecessor to the Machbet.
- Type: Self-propelled anti-aircraft gun
- Place of origin: Israel

Service history
- In service: 1998–present
- Used by: Israel

Production history
- Designer: Israeli Aircraft Industries
- Designed: Mid 1990s

Specifications
- Crew: 4 (commander, gunner, loader, driver)
- Armor: Rolled 5083/5086 H32 aluminium, spaced armor
- Main armament: 20 mm M61 Vulcan
- Secondary armament: 4 × FIM-92 Stinger infrared missiles
- Engine: Detroit Diesel 6V53, 6-cylinder two-stroke diesel 212 hp (158 kW)
- Suspension: Torsion bar
- Operational range: 480 km (300 mi)

The Machbet (Hebrew: מחבט, meaning "racquet") is an Israeli upgrade of the M163 Hovet self-propelled automatic anti-aircraft gun, based in turn on the M113 armored personnel carrier. In addition to the 20 mm M61 Vulcan rotary cannon it is armed with four FIM-92 Stinger surface-to-air missile launch tubes. The Machbet comes equipped with an upgraded tracking system and can establish a datalink with an external radar. The vehicle carries 1,800 rounds of 20 mm ammunition and 8 Stinger missiles. The Israeli Aircraft Industries (IAI) developed the Machbet in the mid-1990s. It underwent testing by the Israel Defense Forces (IDF) in 1997 and entered operational service in 1998 with the Israeli Air Force (IAF). The IAF was planning to convert all its Hovets to the newer Machbet configuration. Most of the Hovets have already been converted over to the Machbet.

The Machbet upgrade adds an enhanced suite of television and Forward-looking infrared (FLIR) target auto-tracking capability to the Hovet. A unit-level fire coordination and management capability is provided, as well as an interface to a sectorial air surveillance radar for the air targets picture. These all enable it to acquire approaching targets quicker, making the Machbet more effective than its predecessor.

While the intended role of the Machbet is the shooting down of aircraft approaching at low altitudes, it has been also found useful in urban warfare and ground fire support in general.

== Operator ==
- Israel – following the closing of tactical Anti-Air units in the IDF, both the VADS and the upgraded VADS ('hovet', fitted with stingers) were retired in 2006. In 2024 evaluation started for reuse of old VADS units against drone threats.
