= M167 VADS =

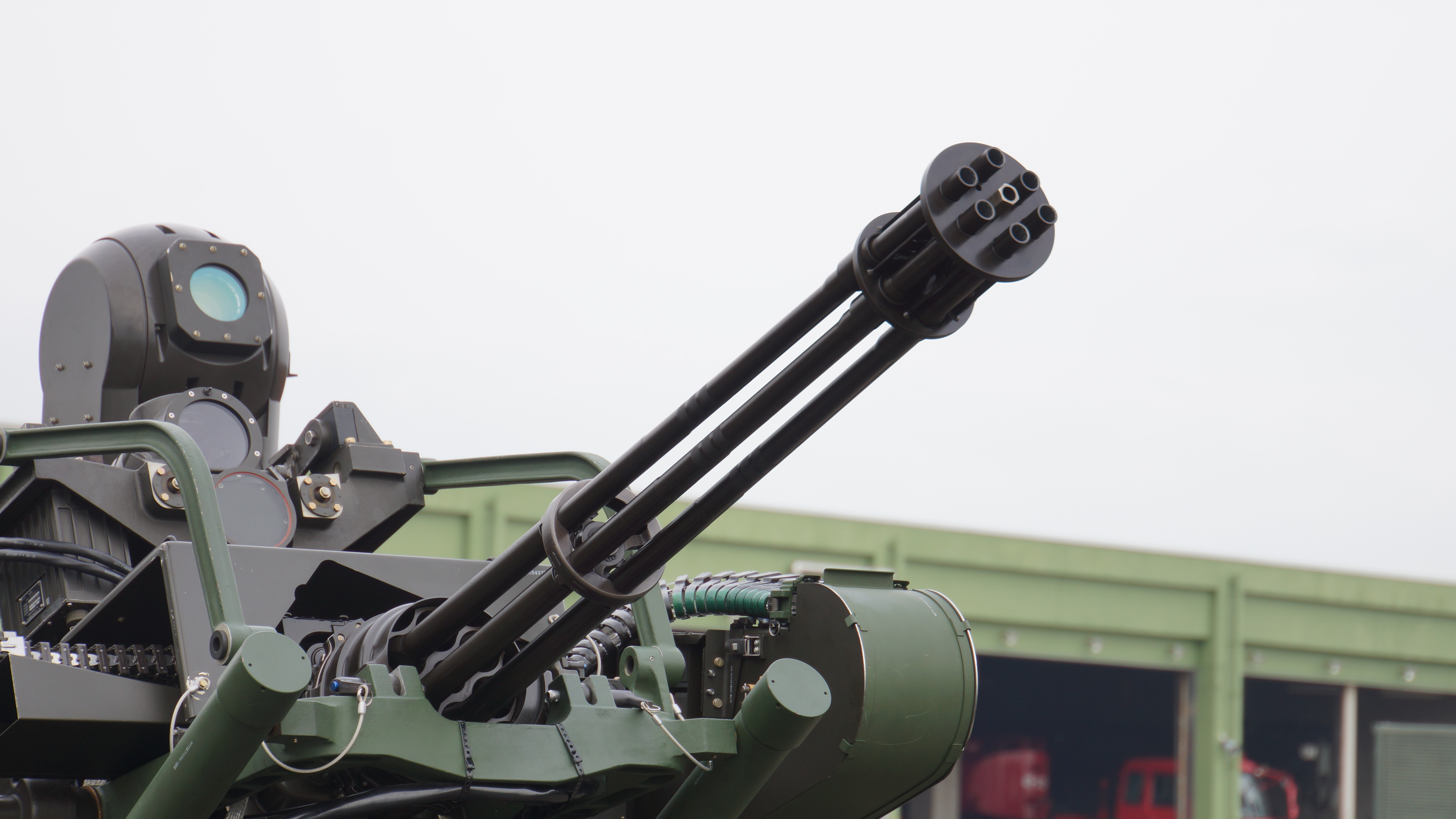
- A JASDF JM167A1 mounted on an AA gun mount at Tsuiki Air Base.
- Type: Rotary cannon
- Place of origin: United States

Service history
- In service: 1965–1994 (United States); 1960s–present (other countries)
- Used by: See Operators
- Wars: War in Darfur; Sudanese conflict in South Kordofan and Blue Nile; Yemeni Civil War (2015–present); Saudi Arabian-led intervention in Yemen

Production history
- Designer: Rock Island Arsenal
- Designed: 1964
- Manufacturer: Armament Systems Department, General Electric; Daewoo Heavy Industries Ltd
- Variants: See Variants

Specifications
- Mass: 1,583 kg (3,490 lb) including carriage
- Length: 472.4 cm (186.0 in) in travel configuration; 386.1 cm (152.0 in) emplaced
- Cartridge: 20×102mm
- Caliber: 20 mm (0.787 in)
- Barrels: 6-barrel (progressive RH parabolic twist, 9 grooves)
- Action: Hydraulically operated, electrically fired, rotary cannon
- Rate of fire: 1000 or 3000 rounds per minute
- Muzzle velocity: 1030 m/s
- Effective firing range: 1200m (Aerial) or 4500m (Ground)
- Feed system: 500rd linked feed

The M167 Vulcan Air Defense System (VADS) is a towed, short-range United States Army anti-aircraft gun designed to protect forward area combat elements and rear area critical assets. It was also used to protect U.S. Air Force warplane airfields and U.S. Army helicopter airfields. The heart of the M167 is the M168 Cannon, a variant of the M61 Vulcan 20×102 mm rapid-fire rotary cannon.

It was also effective against lightly armored ground targets. The M167 gun has now been withdrawn from service by U.S. military units, but is still used by other countries.

== History ==
The two versions of the Vulcan Air-Defense System, the towed M167 and self-propelled M163 VADS, were developed by the United States Army Weapons Command at Rock Island Arsenal in 1964. They were accepted as a replacement for the M45 Quadmount in 1965, and first production M167s were delivered to the U.S. Army in 1967.

Starting in 1994, the M167 was replaced in U.S. service by the M1097 Avenger missile launcher and in 2005, by a ground-based version of the Phalanx CIWS self-defense gun which the U.S. Navy uses on its ships. The Phalanx CIWS uses the same basic 20 mm rapid-fire Gatling gun as the M167.

== Design ==
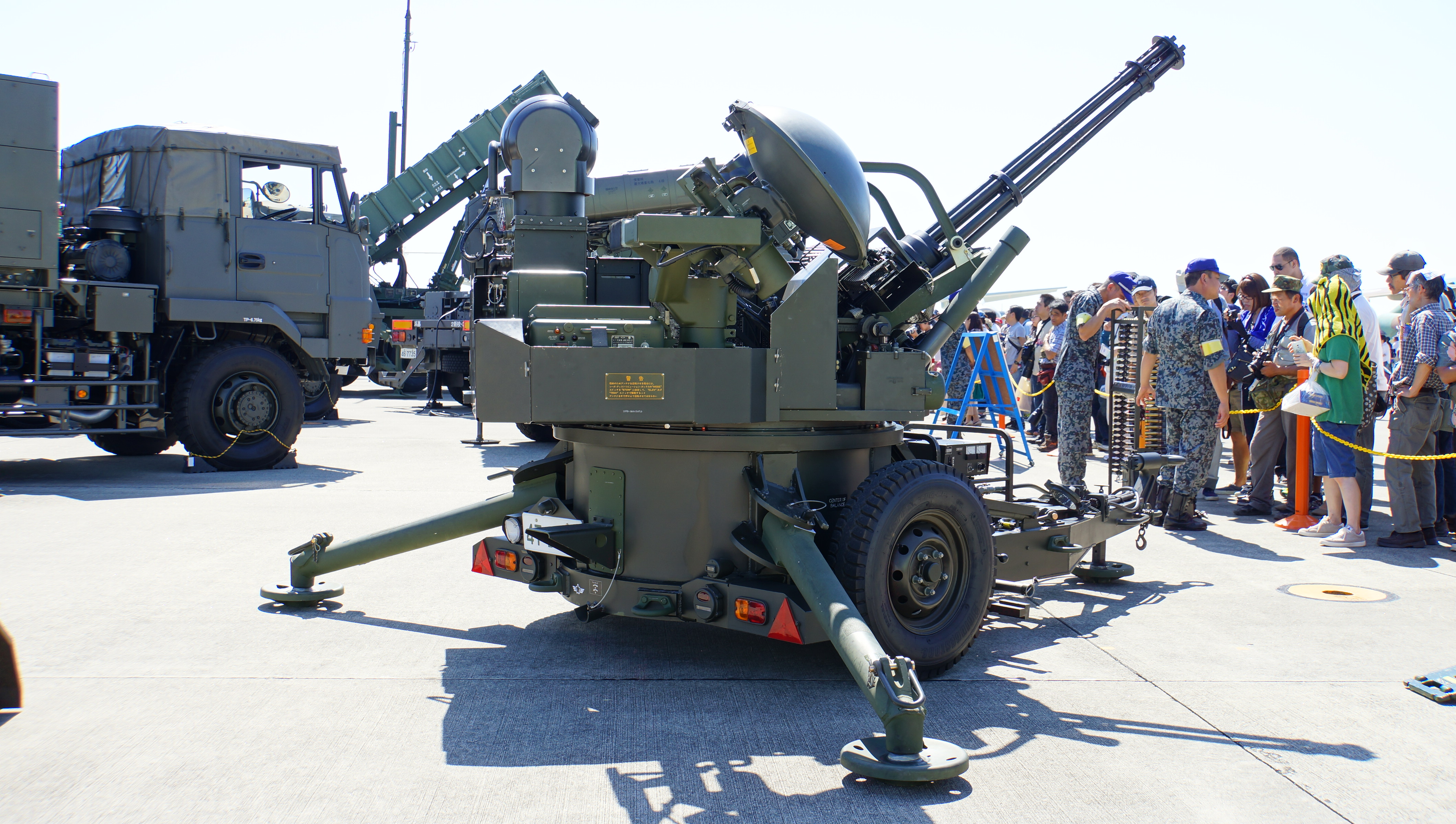
A JASDF VADS on display at the JASDF's Hamamatsu base.

The M167 VADS consists of a 20mm M168 cannon, linked ammunition feed system, and a fire control system in powered turret, mounted on an M42A1 towed carriage.

The M167A2 VADS was modified with an improved fire-control subsystem. The improvement was obtained by replacing the disturbed reticle sight with a director reticle sight, the sight current generator with a digital processor, and the azimuth drive assembly with a harmonic drive. It also had an extra wheel put on each side which prevented flipping by providing a longer lever.

Sudan and Yemen used M167 guns seated upon the Soviet BTR-152 APC.

== Operators ==
=== Current operators ===
- Botswana (7)
- Chile
- Ecuador (10)
- Egypt (72)
- Honduras (30)
- Israel
- Japan
- South Korea (60)
- Saudi Arabia (30) Used by the National Guard
- Sudan (16)
- Thailand (24)
- Uruguay (6)
- Yemen - Used by Houthi forces

=== Former operators ===
- Belgium
- Morocco (40, 42 delivered)
- United States

== See also ==
- M163 VADS
- M61 Vulcan
- Phalanx CIWS
