= Century Series =

Group of US fighter aircraft between designations F-100 and F-106

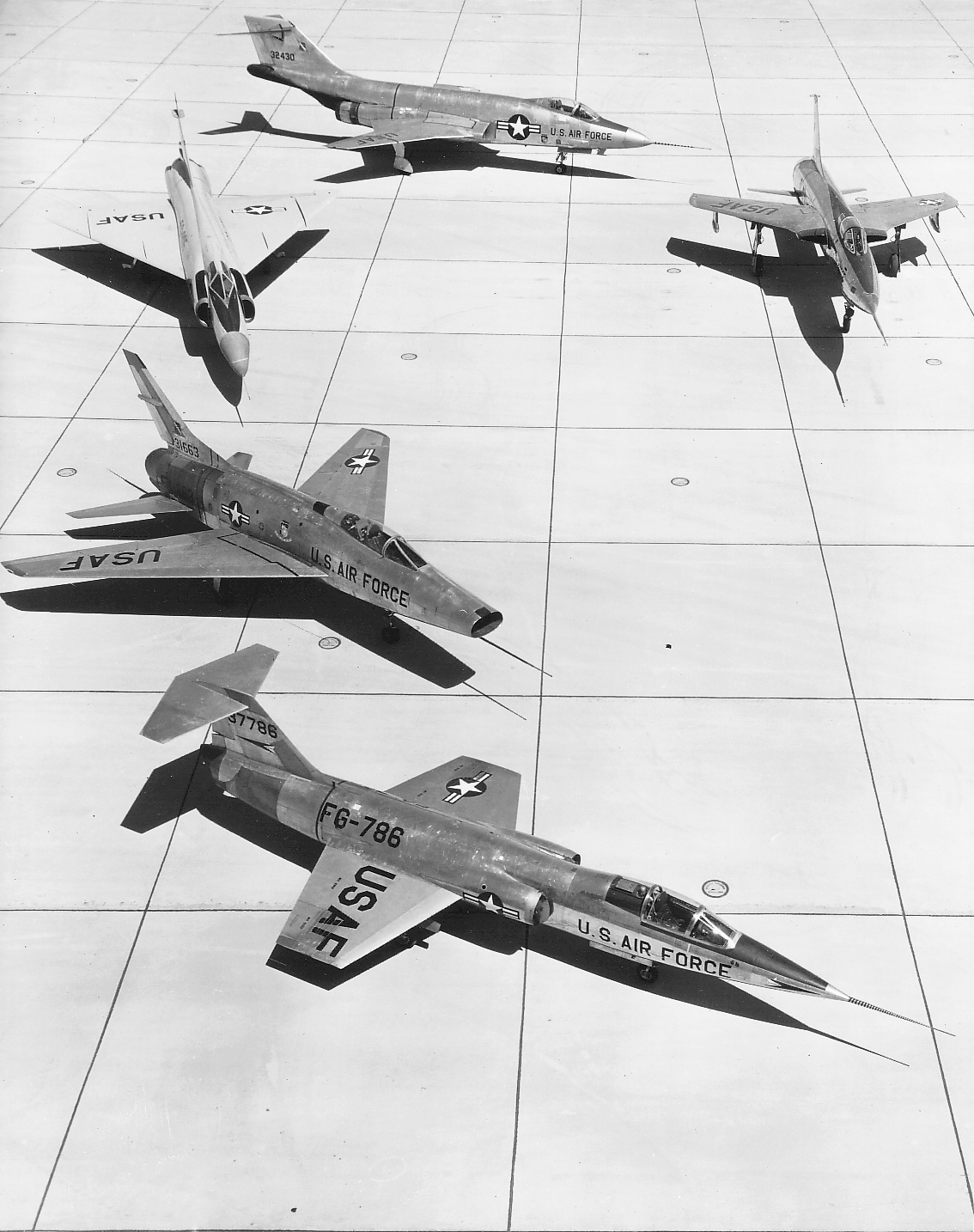
Clockwise from bottom: F-104 Starfighter, F-100 Super Sabre, F-102 Delta Dagger, F-101 Voodoo, and F-105 Thunderchief

The Century Series is a popular name for a group of US fighter aircraft representing models designated between F-100 and F-106 which went into full production. They included the first successful supersonic aircraft designs in the United States Air Force's service, which remained in active service well into the 1970s and 1980s with the Air Force Reserve and Air National Guard. Three later variants, the QF-100, QF-102, and QF-106, also continued in service, primarily as aerial target drones, until the late 1990s. The F-104G stayed in service with the Italian military until 2004. A small number of F-104 are in airworthy condition and used by the company Starfighters Space.

== Century Series aircraft ==
The name "Century Series" stems from the fighter (F-) designation number being in the 100–109 range. The term became popular to refer to a group of generally similar designs of the 1950s and early 1960s.

As it evolved, the attribution of the Century Series moniker reflects models designated between F-100 and F-106 which went into full production:

- North American F-100 Super Sabre
- McDonnell F-101 Voodoo
- Convair F-102 Delta Dagger
- Lockheed F-104 Starfighter
- Republic F-105 Thunderchief
- Convair F-106 Delta Dart

The term "Century Series" does not include less successful models between the F-100 and F-109 that did not go past design or prototype stage: the Republic XF-103 and North American XF-108 Rapier interceptor concepts, the North American F-107 tactical fighter prototype (cancelled in favor of the F-105), and designation "F-109" which was originally assigned to the F-101B Voodoo and later requested but not granted for the Bell XF-109 VTOL concept.

The F- series number sequence used in USAF was a continuation of the pre-USAF pursuit aircraft (P- series) numbering, stretching back as far as to the 1920s. The numbering would continue sequentially up to the General Dynamics F-111, and after this number, the 1962 United States Tri-Service aircraft designation system restarted the numbering back from 1. The McDonnell Douglas F-4 Phantom II fighter-bomber was briefly known as the F-110 Spectre. The USAF continued the naming convention with the Constant Peg program as an operations security measure. The last known aircraft with an F-1xx designation is the Lockheed F-117 Nighthawk stealth attack aircraft, which is unrelated to other F-1xx aircraft but received the designation as an additional layer of obscuration for this highly secretive program.

De-classified Tactical Weapons Effects Tests of the U.S. Air-Force Century-Series aircraft.

=== Characteristics ===
The Century Series aircraft represented a mix of day fighters (F-100A), fighter-bombers (F-100C/D, F-101A/C, F-104C, F-105B/D), and interceptors (F-101B, F-102A, F-104A, F-106A).

The unifying characteristic of the Century Series aircraft was advanced performance and avionics when they were introduced. The F-100 was the first aircraft in the USAF capable of exceeding the speed of sound in level flight. The F-101 was the first aircraft in the USAF capable of exceeding 1,000 mph (1,600 km/h). The F-102 was the first aircraft in the world to utilize area rule in its design. The F-104 was the first combat aircraft capable of Mach 2 flight, and the only aircraft in history to simultaneously hold the world speed, time-to-climb and altitude records. Three of the Century Series aircraft—the F-101B, F-102A, and F-106A—were equipped to carry nuclear air-to-air armaments. These weapons, designed to destroy incoming nuclear-armed Soviet bombers even without scoring a direct hit, were the only nuclear weapons in the USAF arsenal at the time to be placed under the sole control of their pilots during a mission.

Similar advancements were within the United States Navy and Marine Corps during the same time period with the McDonnell F3H Demon, Douglas F4D Skyray, Grumman F11F Tiger, and Vought F8U Crusader carrier-based fighters, but United States Naval and Marine Corps Aviation lacked a distinct naming group akin to the Air Force's Century Series.

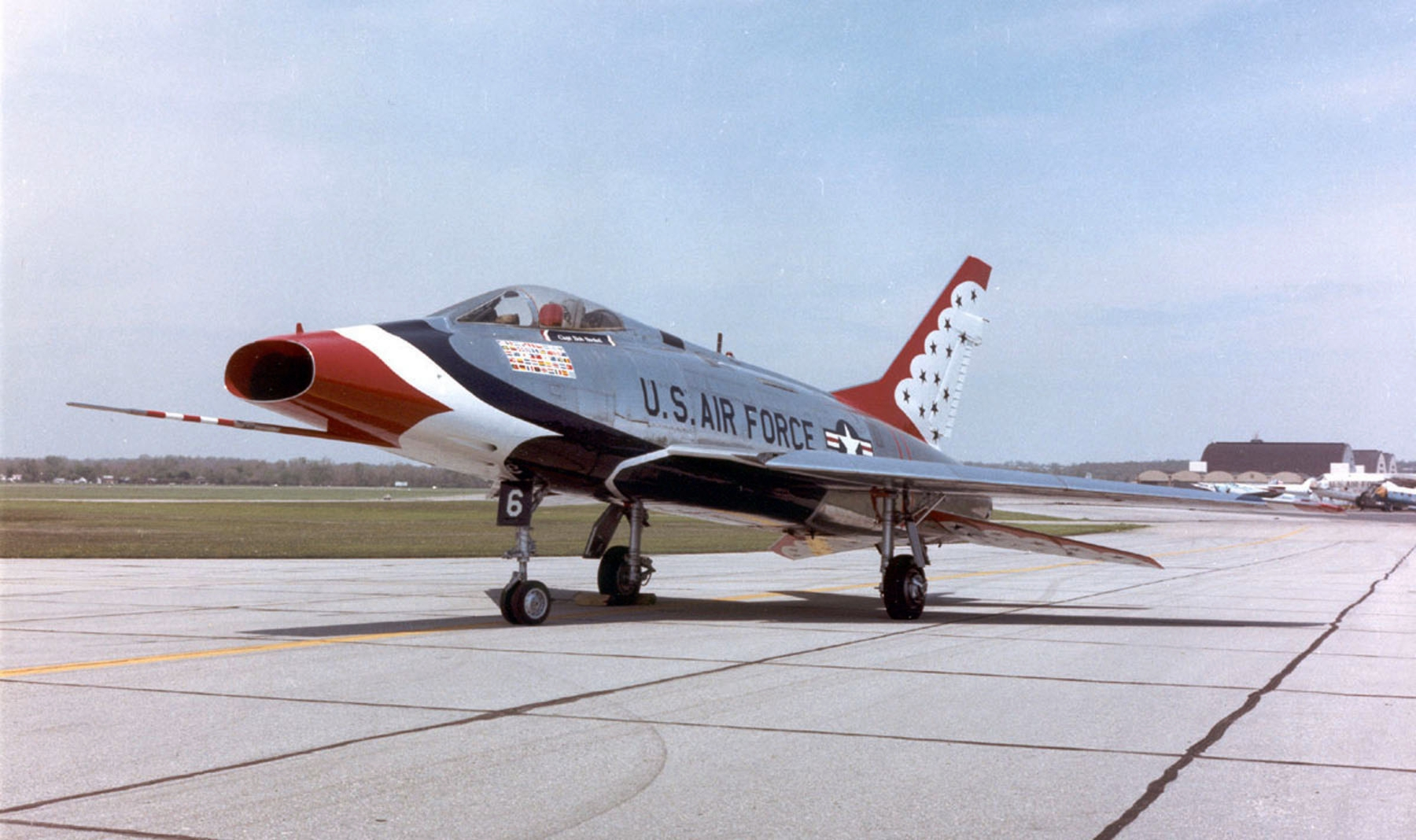
USAF "Thunderbirds" F-100D

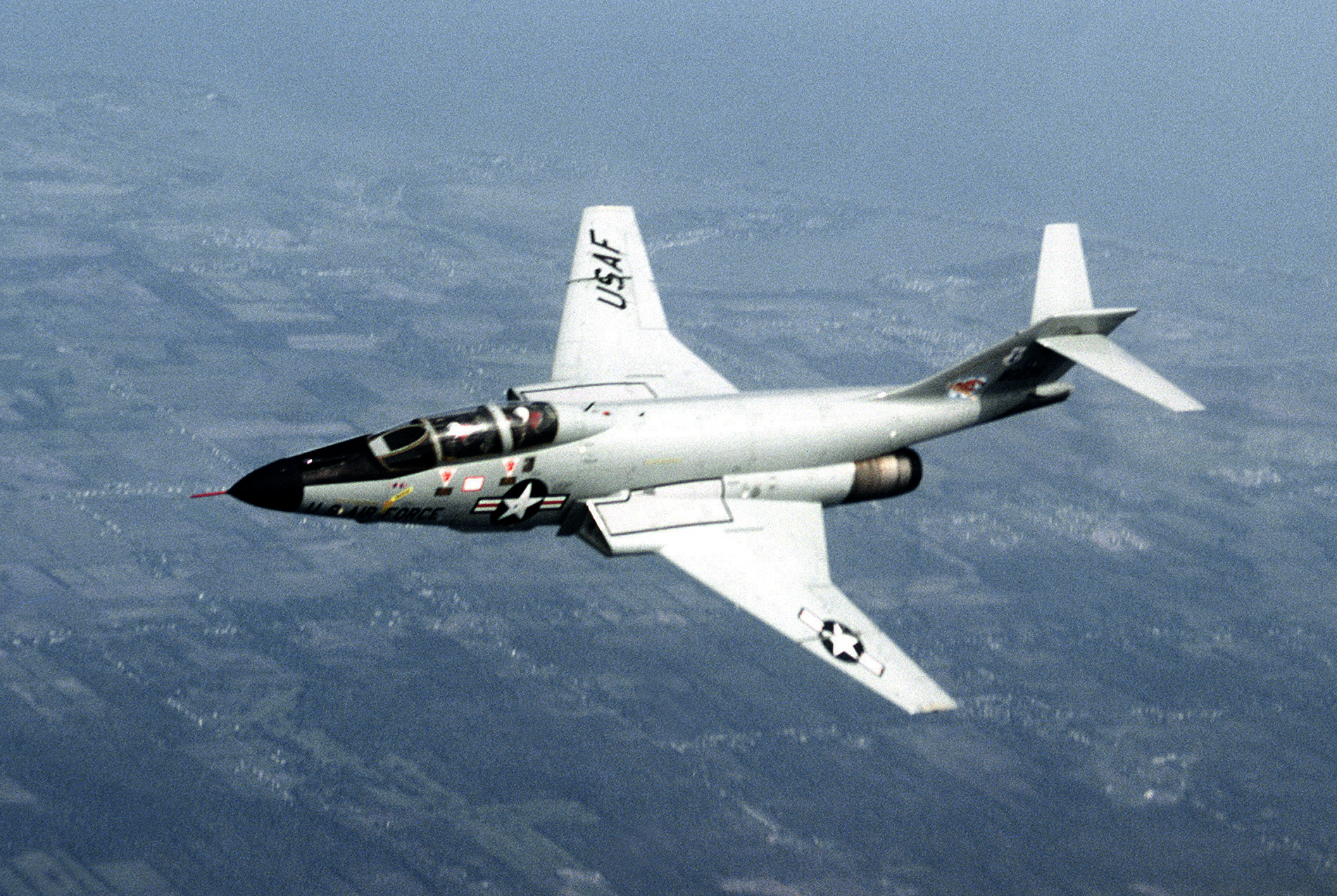
McDonnell F-101B Voodoo

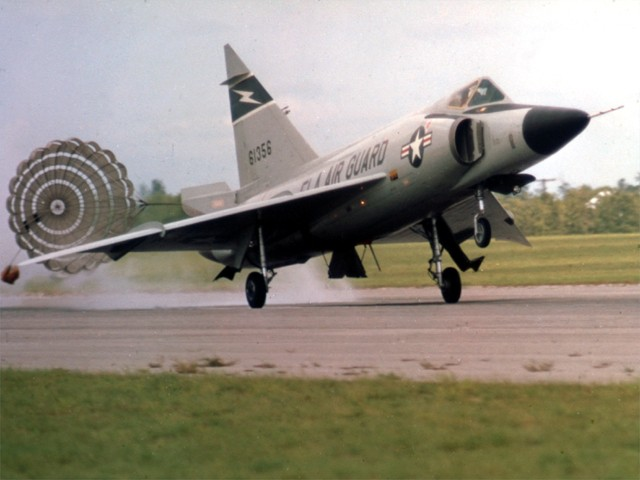
F-102 deploys braking parachute

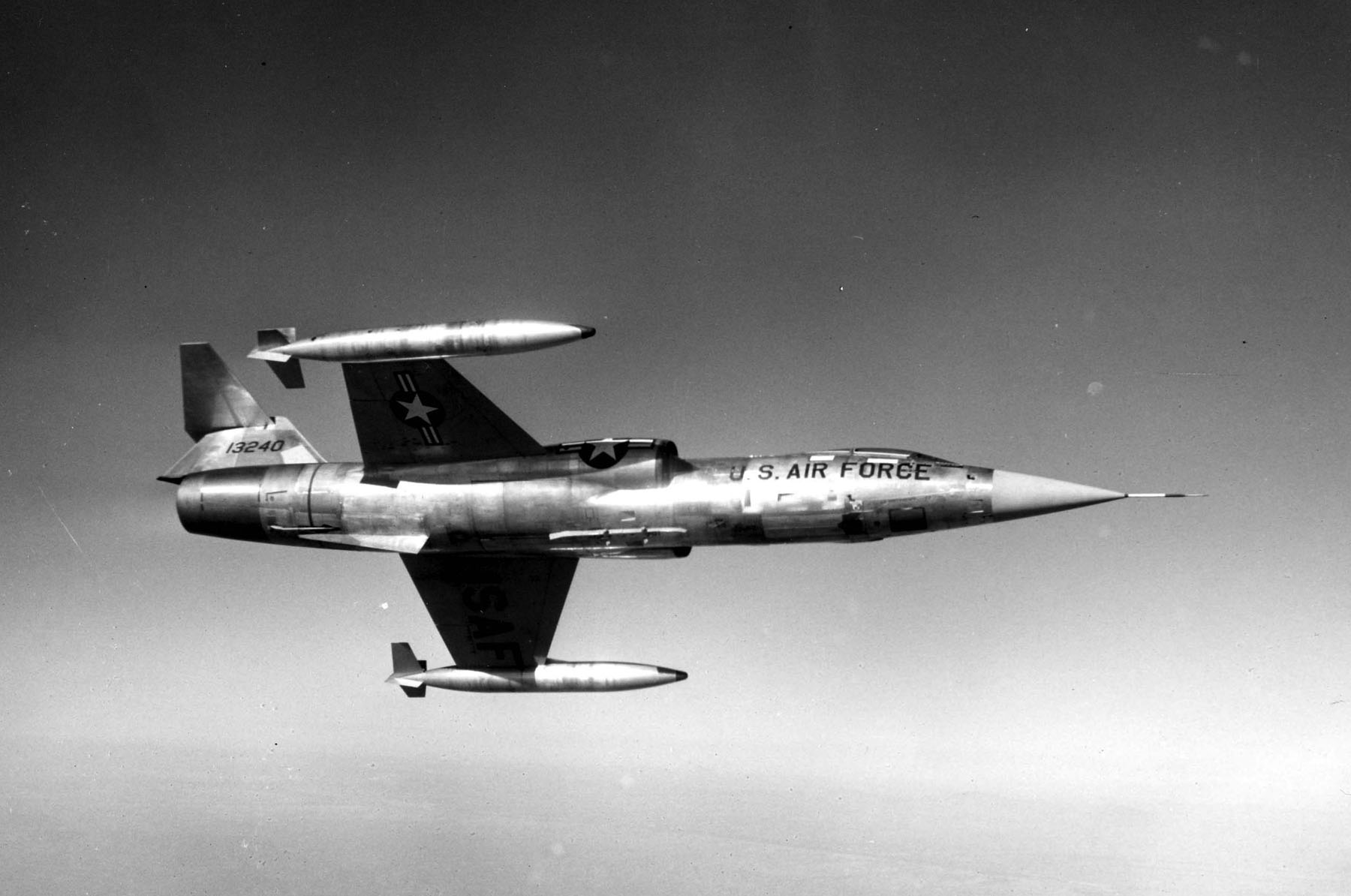
Lockheed F-104G Starfighter with external wingtip fuel tanks

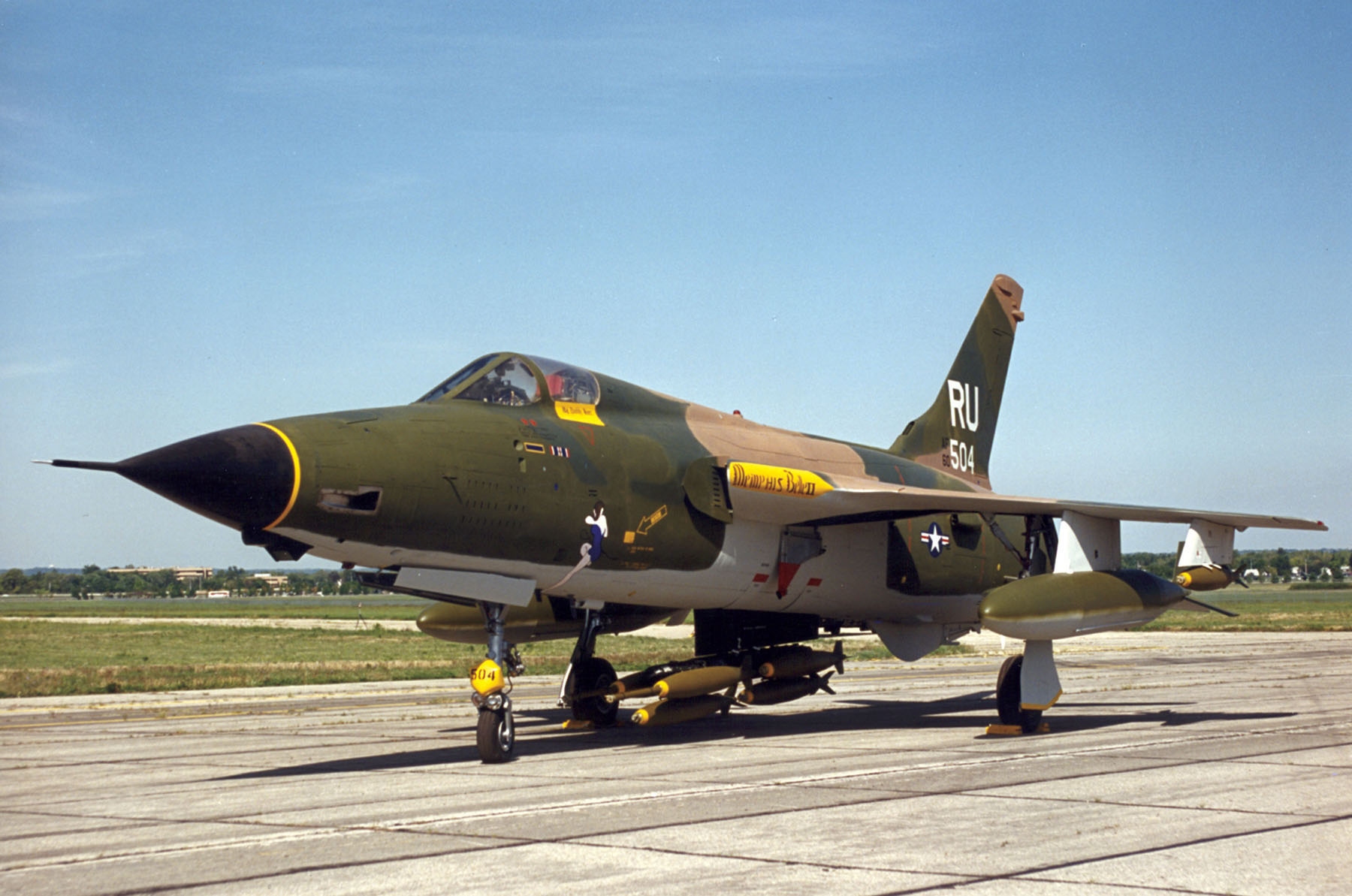
Republic F-105D with full bomb load

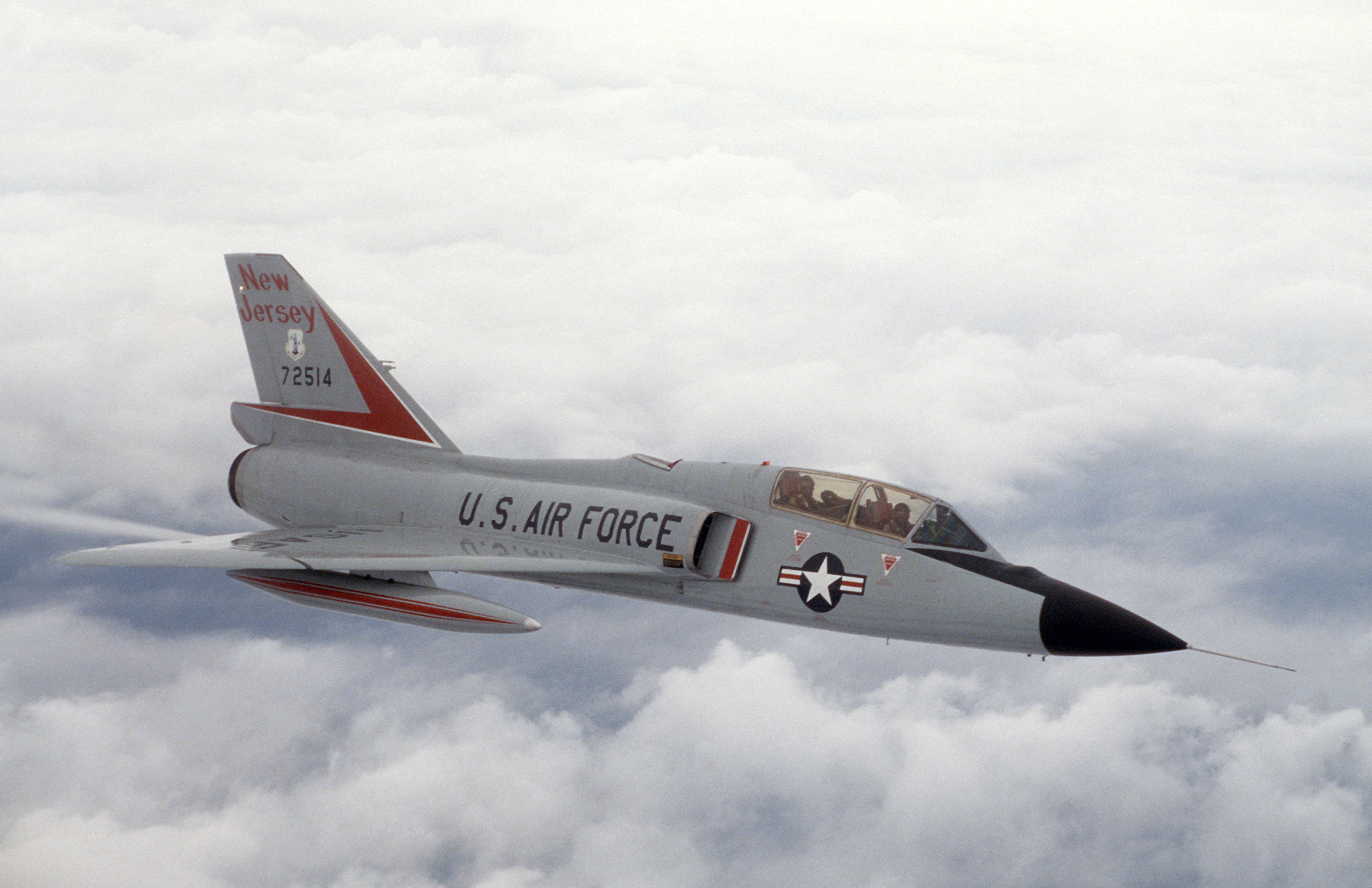
USAF F-106B Delta Dart

== See also ==
- Teen Series
- United States military aircraft designation systems
- List of military aircraft of the United States
