= M163 VADS =

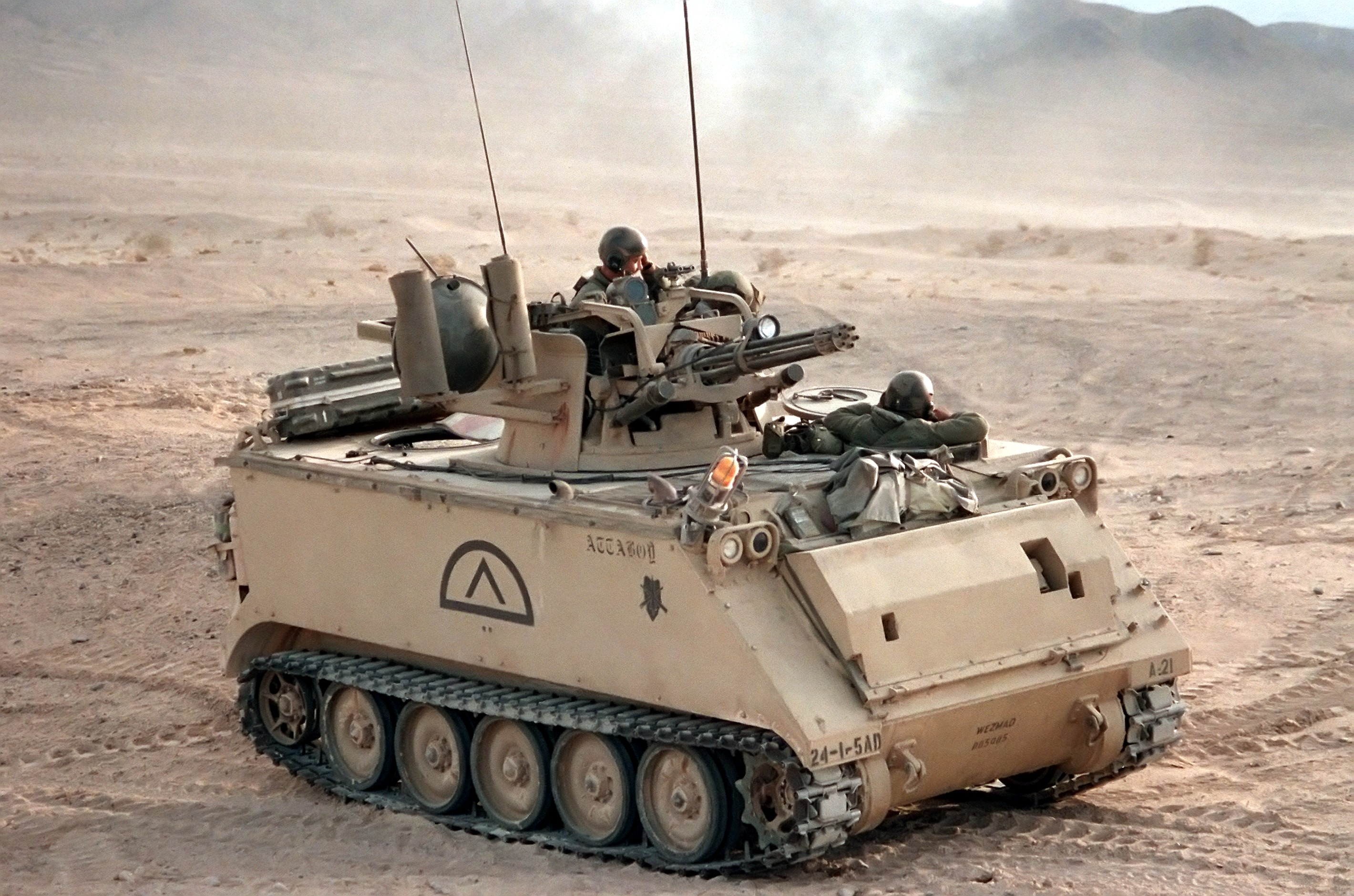
- A U.S. Army M163 from the 24th Infantry Division at the Fort Irwin National Training Center in November 1988
- Type: Self-propelled anti-aircraft gun
- Place of origin: United States

Service history
- In service: 1968–present
- Used by: See list of operators
- Wars: Vietnam War; Western Sahara War; 1982 Lebanon War; Invasion of Panama; Persian Gulf War; Israeli–Palestinian conflict; Iraq War (limited); Yemeni Civil War; Saudi Arabian–led intervention in Yemen; 2025 Cambodia-Thailand conflict

Production history
- Designer: General Electric
- Designed: 1964
- Produced: 1965–1970, 1975–1979, 1982
- No. built: 654

Specifications
- Mass: 24,700 lb (11,200 kg) (M163); 27,140 lb (12,310 kg) (M163A1); 27,542 lb (12,493 kg) (M163A2) combat weight
- Length: 191.5 in (4.86 m)
- Width: 112.4 in (2.85 m)
- Height: 115 in (2.9 m)
- Crew: 4 (commander, gunner, loader, driver)
- Elevation: +80° / -5°
- Armor: Rolled 5083/5086 H32 aluminium, 29 mm (1.14 in) - 45 mm (1.77 in)
- Main armament: M168 General Dynamics 20 mm Rotary cannon 2,000 rounds (M163); 2,230 rounds (M163A1/A2)
- Engine: General Motors 6V53, 6-cylinder two-stroke diesel 212 hp (158 kW)
- Suspension: torsion bar, 5 road wheels
- Operational range: 275 mi (443 km) (M163/A2); 300 mi (480 km) (M163A1)
- Maximum speed: 40 mph (64 km/h)

The M163 Vulcan Air Defense System (VADS), officially Gun, Air Defense Artillery, Self-Propelled 20-mm, M163, is a self-propelled anti-aircraft gun (SPAAG) primarily used by the United States Army. The M163 provides mobile, short-range air defense protection for ground units against low-flying fixed-wing aircraft and helicopters. It replaced the M42 Duster as the standard American armored light air-defense gun.

== Specifications ==
The M163 VADS uses the M168 gun, a variant of the General Dynamics 20 mm (0.79 in) M61A1 rotary cannon, the standard cannon in most U.S. combat aircraft since the 1960s. The gun is mounted on a modified M113A1 vehicle (the M741 carrier). Designed to complement the M48 Chaparral missile system, it is limited to fair-weather operations. The M163 uses a small range-only AN/VPS-2 radar and an M61 optical lead-calculating sight, and is incapable of using the radar to scan an area for targets. The system is suitable for night operations with the use of AN/PVS series night vision sights that can be mounted to the right side of the primary sight.

The gun fires at 3,000 rounds per minute in short bursts of 10, 30, 60, or 100 rounds, or it can fire in continuous fire mode at a rate of 1,000 rounds per minute. A linkless feed system is used. Its 20x102mm round gave it a low effective range of only 1,200 meters (3,900 ft), and its standard air-defense load of HEI-T rounds would self-destruct at approximately 1,800 meters (5,900 ft), a hard limit on range. The feed drum holds 1,200 rounds ready to fire, with 800 rounds stowed in reserve for the M163, later increased to 1,030 rounds stowed in reserve for the M163A1 and A2.

== Service history ==
Deliveries of the Army version began in 1968.

In US and Israeli service, the VADS has rarely been needed in its intended purpose of providing defense against aerial threats—consequently, the Vulcan gun system was in use throughout the late 1980s and early 1990s primarily as a ground support weapon. For example, VADS guns were used to support American ground assault troops in Panama in 1989 during Operation Just Cause. One Vulcan of B Battery, 2/62 ADA sank a PDF patrol boat. The last combat action the VADS participated in US service was Operation Desert Storm.

In the Israeli Air Defense Command, the "Hovet" (the Israeli designation to the M163 VADS) scored three shoot-downs, including the first shoot-down of a jet warplane (a Syrian MiG-21 fighter jet) by the M163 VADS, during Operation Peace for Galilee in 1982. The Israel Defense Forces also used the Hovet for fire support during urban warfare in Operation Peace for Galilee (1982) and Operation Defensive Shield (2002).

== Upgrades and replacement ==
In order to provide effective battlefield air defense against helicopters equipped with anti-tank missiles that could be fired accurately from ranges of several kilometers, the VADS was slated to be replaced by the M247 Sergeant York DIVADS (Divisional Air Defense System), but that system was canceled in August 1985 due to cost overruns, technical problems, and generally poor performance.

In 1984, the improved PIVADS (Product-Improved VADS) system was introduced, providing improvements in the ease of use and accuracy of fire, but the limitations of the 20×102 mm caliber remained. In 1988, the fourth crewmember (observer/loader) was issued a Stinger launcher and two rounds.

Eventually, the M163 was replaced in US service by the M1097 Avenger and the M6 Linebacker, an M2 Bradley with FIM-92 Stinger missiles instead of the standard TOW anti-tank guided missiles: the Stinger missile providing the necessary range to deal with helicopters with anti-tank missiles far out-ranging the 20 mm gun, as well as considerably extending the reach against fixed-wing targets. The final US Army VADS-equipped unit at Fort Riley Kansas completed turn-in of its Vulcans in 1994.

== Ammunition ==
While a large number of 20x102mm rounds have been developed, not all were issued to M163 units. M246 HEI-T-SD was developed alongside the system and was the primary anti-air round, with M56 HEI being used for ground support. PIVADS units could use Mk 149 APDS rounds, which greatly increase maximum effective range due to their higher velocity and lack of a self-destruct. M940 may have been issued for use prior to withdrawal from service, though sources are unclear.

Designation	Type	Projectile Weight (g)	Bursting charge (g)	Muzzle Velocity (m/s)	Description
M56A3/A4	HEI	102	10.7 g HE (H761, a mixture of RDX/wax/Al) and 1.3 g incendiary (I136)	1,030	Nose fuzed round, no tracer. M56A3 has the explosive filler and the incendiary mixed in one pellet, while the M56A4 has the explosive filler inserted in a separate pellet after the incendiary pellet. Effective range of 4,500 m (14,800 ft) against ground targets.
M246/A1	HEI-T-SD	102	7.5 g HE (H761)	1,030	M56 series derived tracer round, with the M246 using M56A3's loading method and M246A1 using the M56A4's loading method. Tracer burnout triggers the self-destruct after 3–7 seconds of flight time, roughly 1,800 meters (5,900 ft). Effective range of 1,200 m (3,900 ft) against air targets, maximum range of 1,800 m (5,900 ft) against ground targets.
M940	MPT-SD	105	4 g HE (A-4) and 3 g incendiary (I136) with 1.2 g incendiary (I68) nose initiator	1,050	Multi-purpose fuzeless round for ground-based air defence, naval and helicopter applications. The HE charge is initiated by the incendiary charge on the nose on impact. Self-destruct due to tracer burn-through. Penetration: 12.5 mm (0.49 in) RHA at 0-degree impact at 518 m (1,700 ft) range, 6.3 mm (0.25 in) at 60 degrees and 940 m (3,080 ft). Effective range of 2,000 m (6,600 ft) against air targets.
Mk 149	APDS	projectile: 93 penetrator: 70	none	1,120	Spin-stabilized finless sub-caliber round with a 12 mm (0.47 in) depleted uranium penetrator. Penetration: 23 mm (0.91 in) armor at 45 degrees at 1,000 m (3,300 ft) and 19 mm (0.75 in) at 45 degrees at 2,000 m (6,600 ft) Effective range of 2,500 m (8,200 ft) against air targets.
M55A2	TP		none	1,030	Inert training round based on the M56 round.
M220	TP-T		none	1,030	M55A2 round with tracer, 1.9 second burn.

== Variants ==
- M163
  - AVADS Automatic track VADS prototype demonstrated by General Electric for the Gun Air Defense Effectiveness Study in 1974. This prototype used a new lead-generating fire control computer paired with a helmet mounted sight. Not adopted.
  - M163A1 incorporated modifications to improve the reliability, availability, and maintainability (RAM). Type reclassified from M163E1 Improved VADS in September 1976. Newly manufactured M163A1s in 1982 used the improved M741A1 carrier, and the M741s in service were converted to M741A1 through 1985.
  - M163A2 PIVADS (1984) accuracy and workload improvements developed by Lockheed Electronics Company including a digital microprocessor, director sight and low backlash azimuth drive system. The PIVADS also used the M741A1 carrier vehicle.
- M167 towed counterpart utilizing the Gama Goat as the prime mover. After 1989, the Humvee became the prime mover.
- Machbet Israeli upgraded version equipped with 4-tube FIM-92 Stinger pod, upgraded tracking system and the ability to share information with local high-power radar.
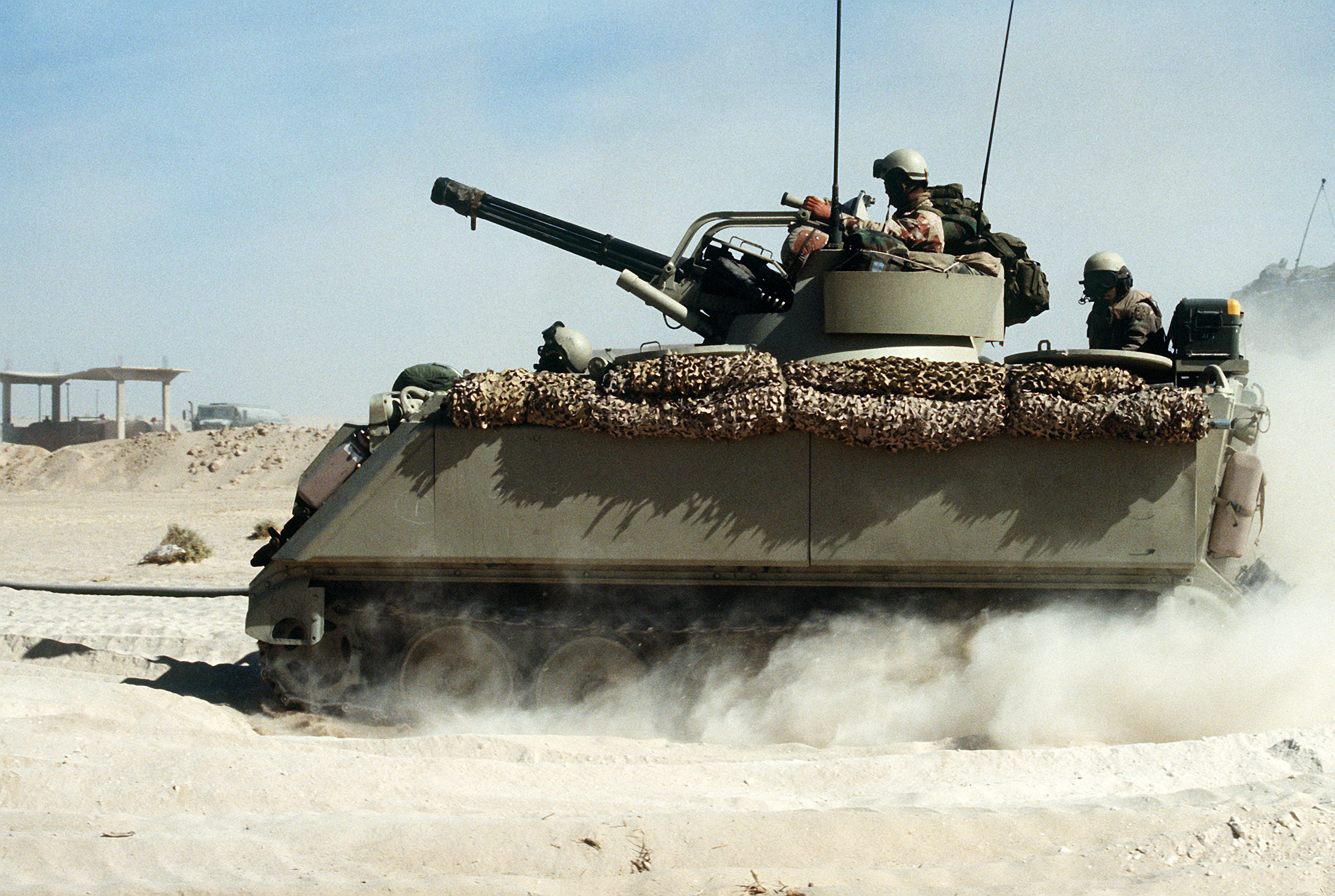
An M163 during the Persian Gulf War's Operation Desert Shield.

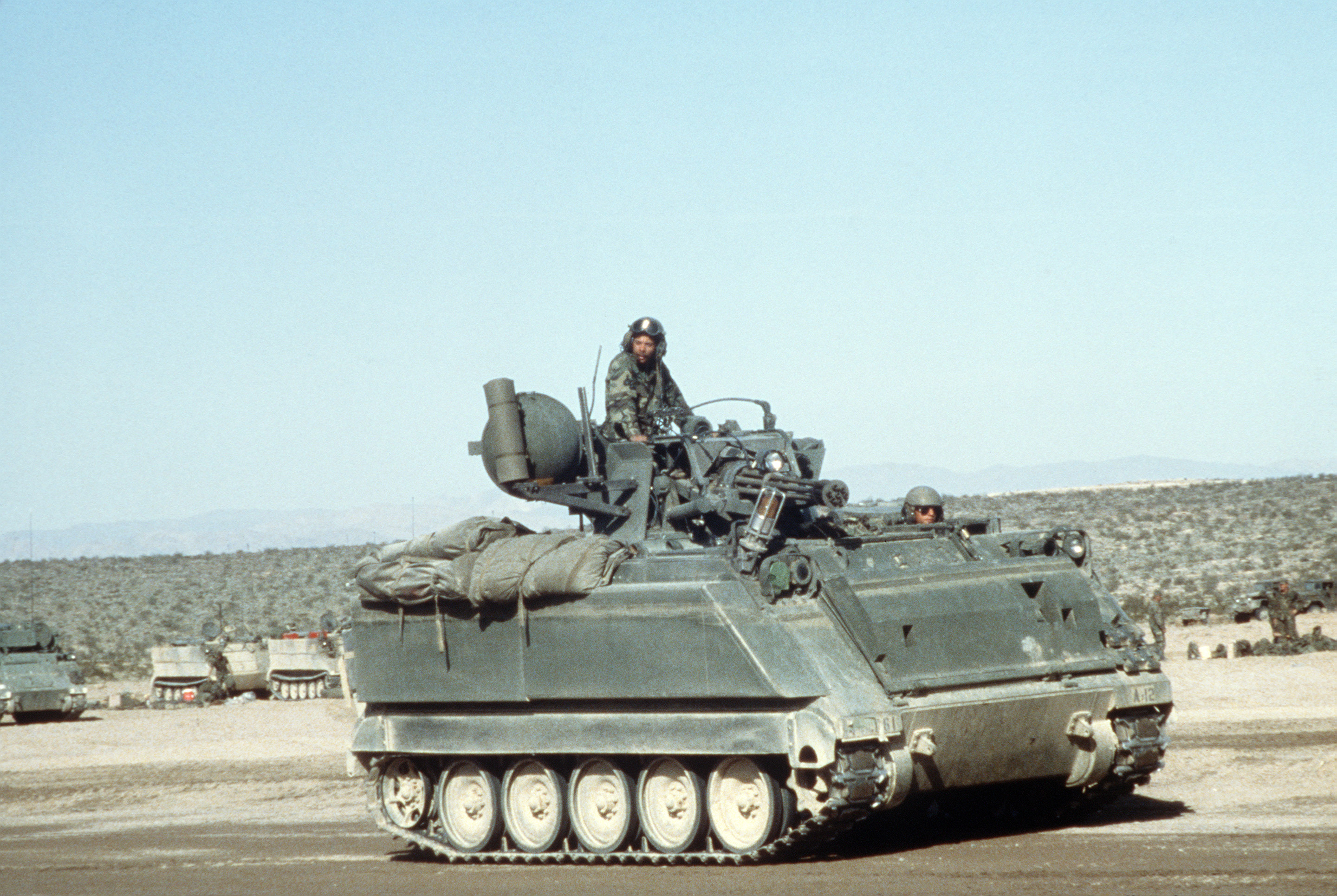
An M163 Vulcan anti-aircraft gun system vehicle returns to the vehicle staging area after an exercise at the National Training Center in Fort Irwin, California.

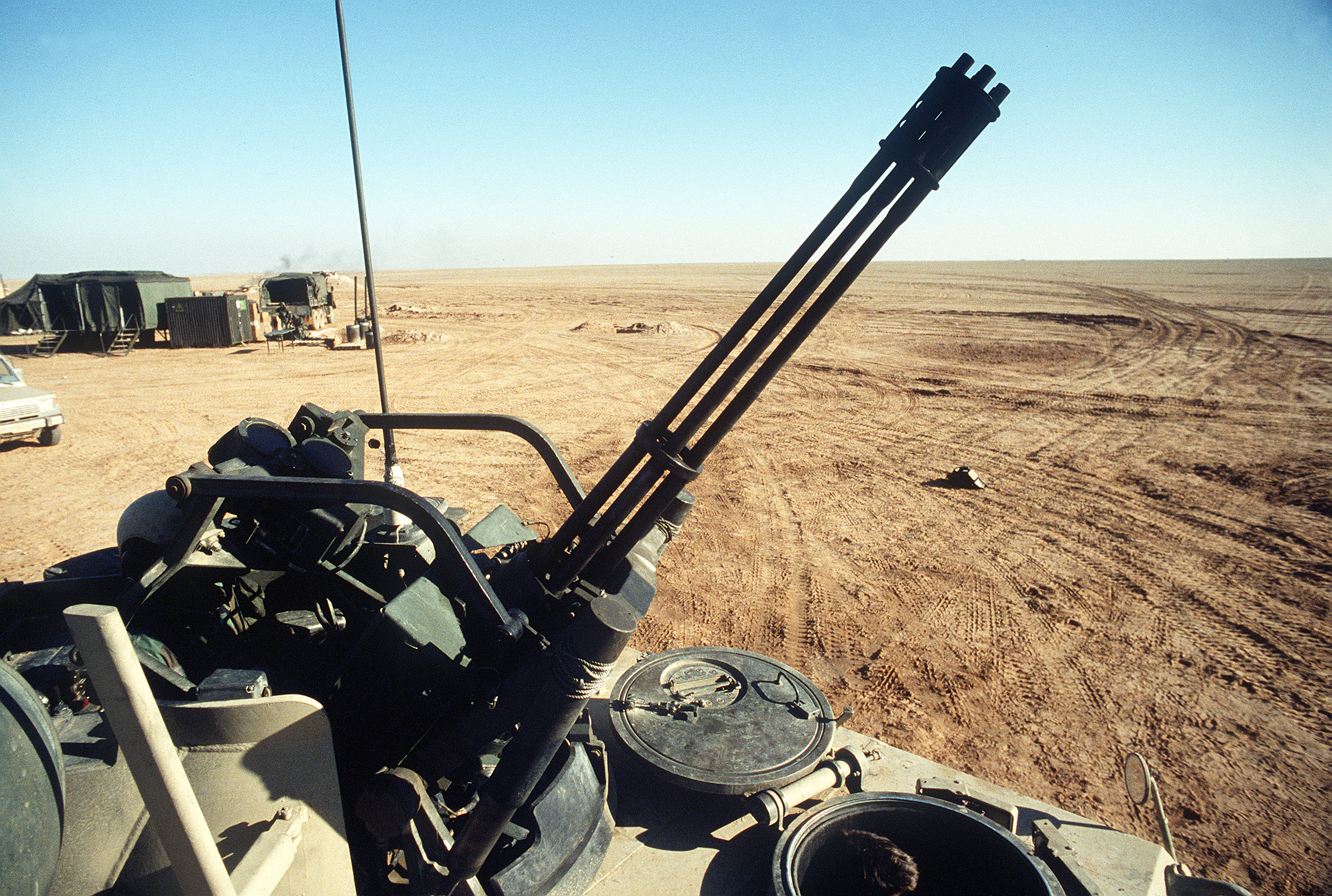
A close-up of the 20 mm Vulcan cannon on the M163 VADS.

== Operators ==
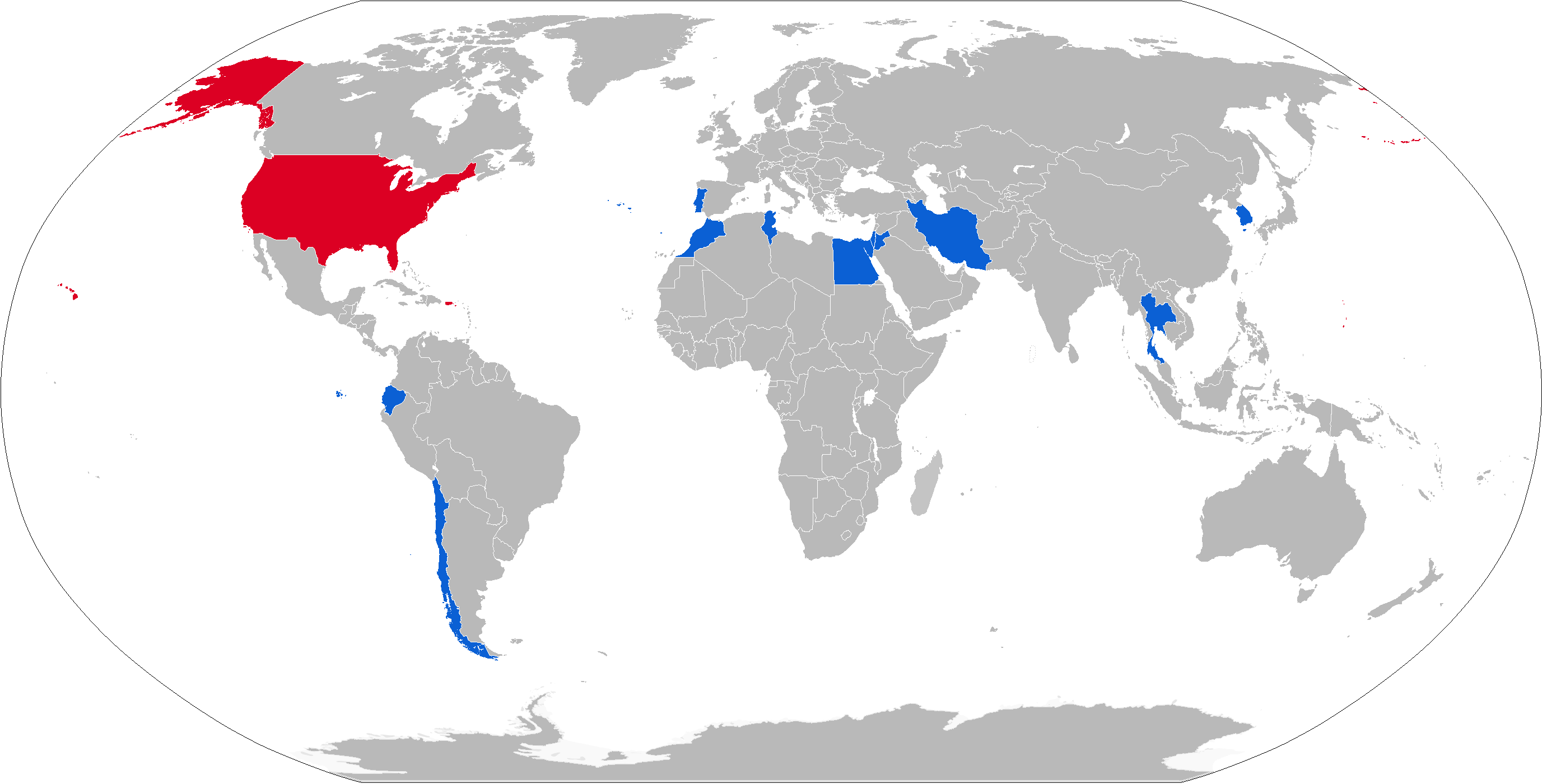
Map with M163 operators Current Former

=== Current operators ===
- Chile – 44 received from United States in 1999 and 2000.
- Ecuador – 44 in service as of 2024.
- Jordan – 100 purchased from the United States.
- Morocco – 110 purchased from United States. 60 currently in service.
- Saudi Arabia – 90. 60 received from the U.S. in 1978 and 1979.
- Thailand – 24 in service as of 2024.
- Houthis - At least one captured as of 9/16/2026 during active conflict with Saudi Arabia.

=== Former operators ===
- United States – In service from 1968 to 1994.
- Portugal – 36 ex-US M163 Vulcan VADS SPAAG ordered in 1986, but never used. Probably purchased to supply parts for the M113A2.
- Israel – following the closing of tactical Anti-Air units in the IDF, both the VADS and the upgraded VADS ('hovet', fitted with stingers) were retired in 2006. In 2024 evaluation started for reuse of old VADS units against drone threats.
- Sudan – 8 received from the U.S. in 1981.
- Yemen – 34 received from United States in 1979.

== See also ==
- Korkut – (Turkey)
- Phalanx CIWS – (United States)
- SIDAM 25 – (Italy)
- M167 VADS – (United States)
- T249 Vigilante – (United States)
