= Teen Series =

Group of American combat aircraft

The Teen Series is a popular name for a group of fourth-generation American combat aircraft. The name stems from a series of American supersonic jet fighters built for the United States Air Force and the United States Navy during the late 20th century. The designations system was the 1962 United States Tri-Service aircraft designation system, which reset the F-# sequence. The term typically includes the Grumman F-14 Tomcat, McDonnell Douglas F-15 Eagle, General Dynamics F-16 Fighting Falcon, and McDonnell Douglas F/A-18 Hornet.

Of the remaining numbers in the teen range (13–19), the designations F-13 and F-19 were not assigned. The prototype Northrop YF-17, which later evolved into the F/A-18, is generally not considered part of the series.

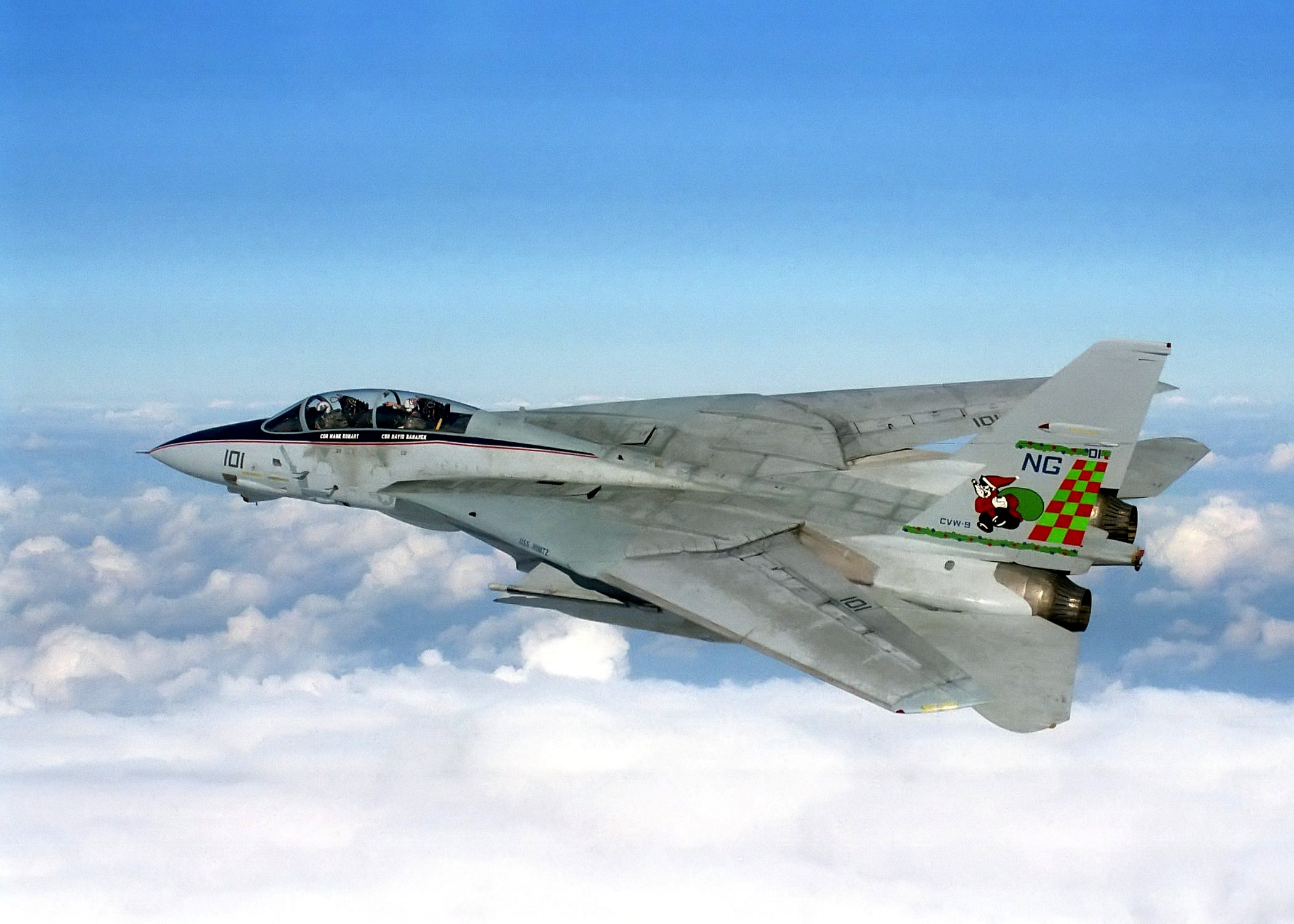
F-14 Tomcat – twin-engine, carrier-capable, two-seat, swing-wing fighter

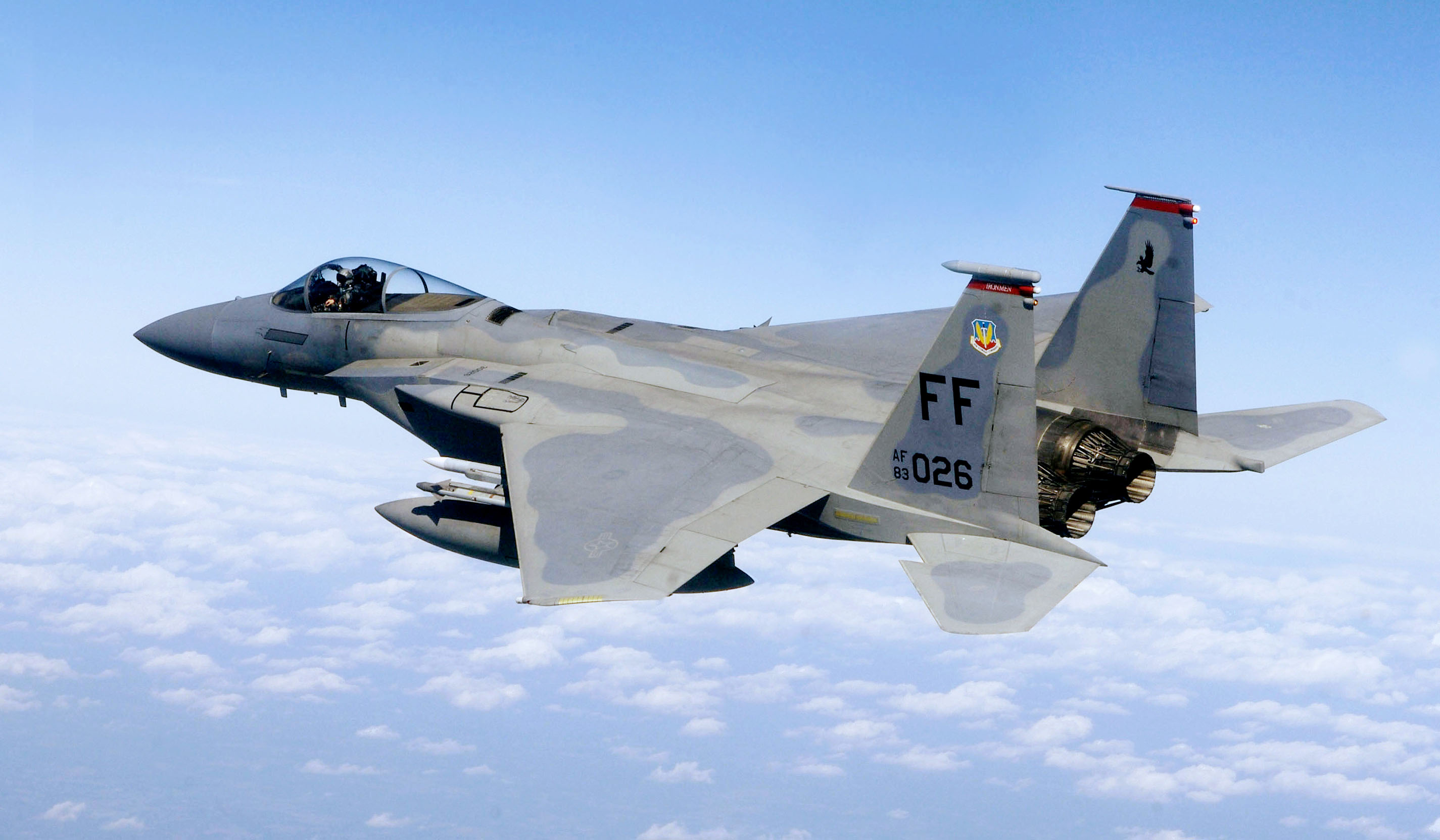
F-15 Eagle – twin-engine, tactical fighter

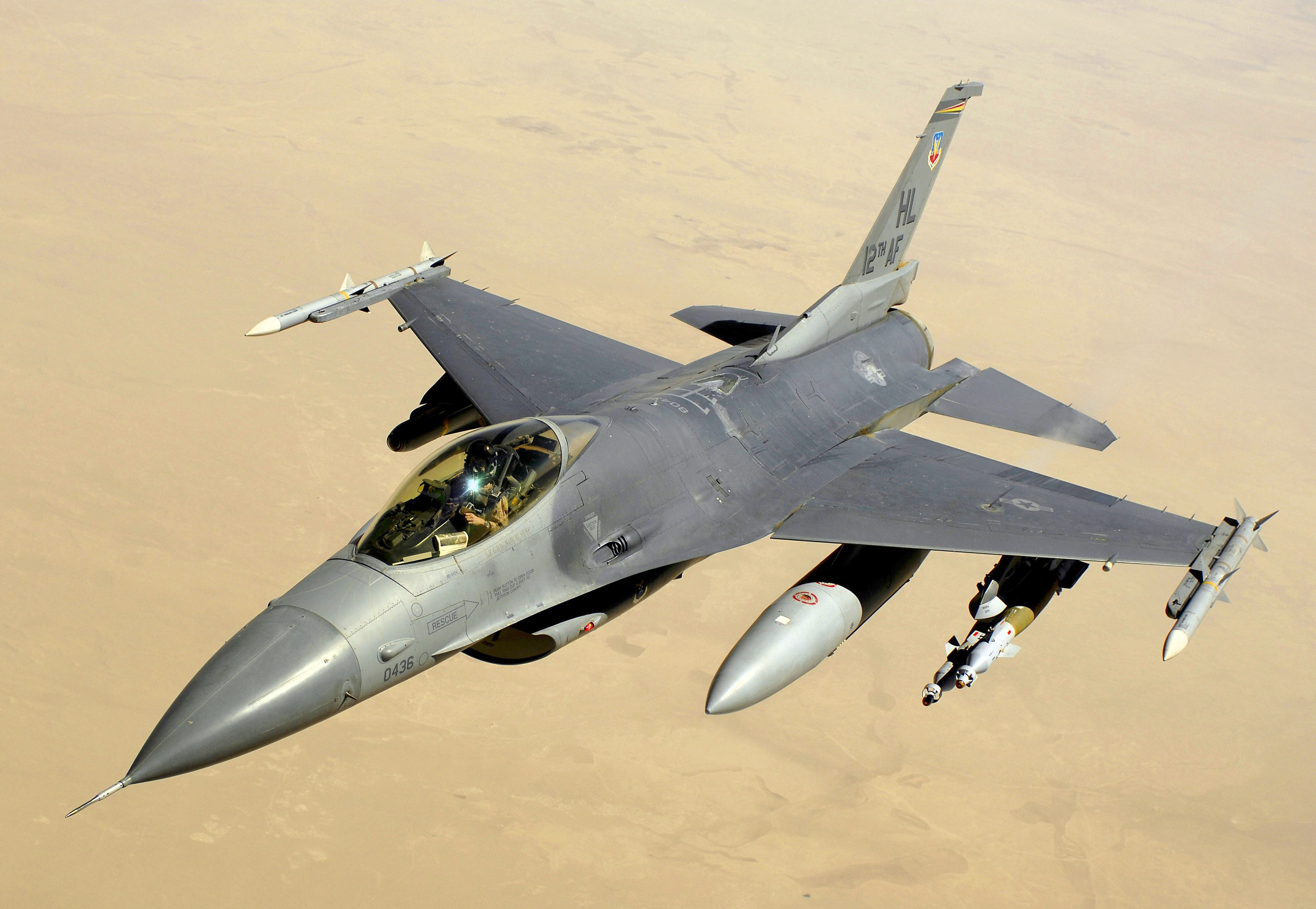
F-16 Fighting Falcon – single-engine, multirole fighter

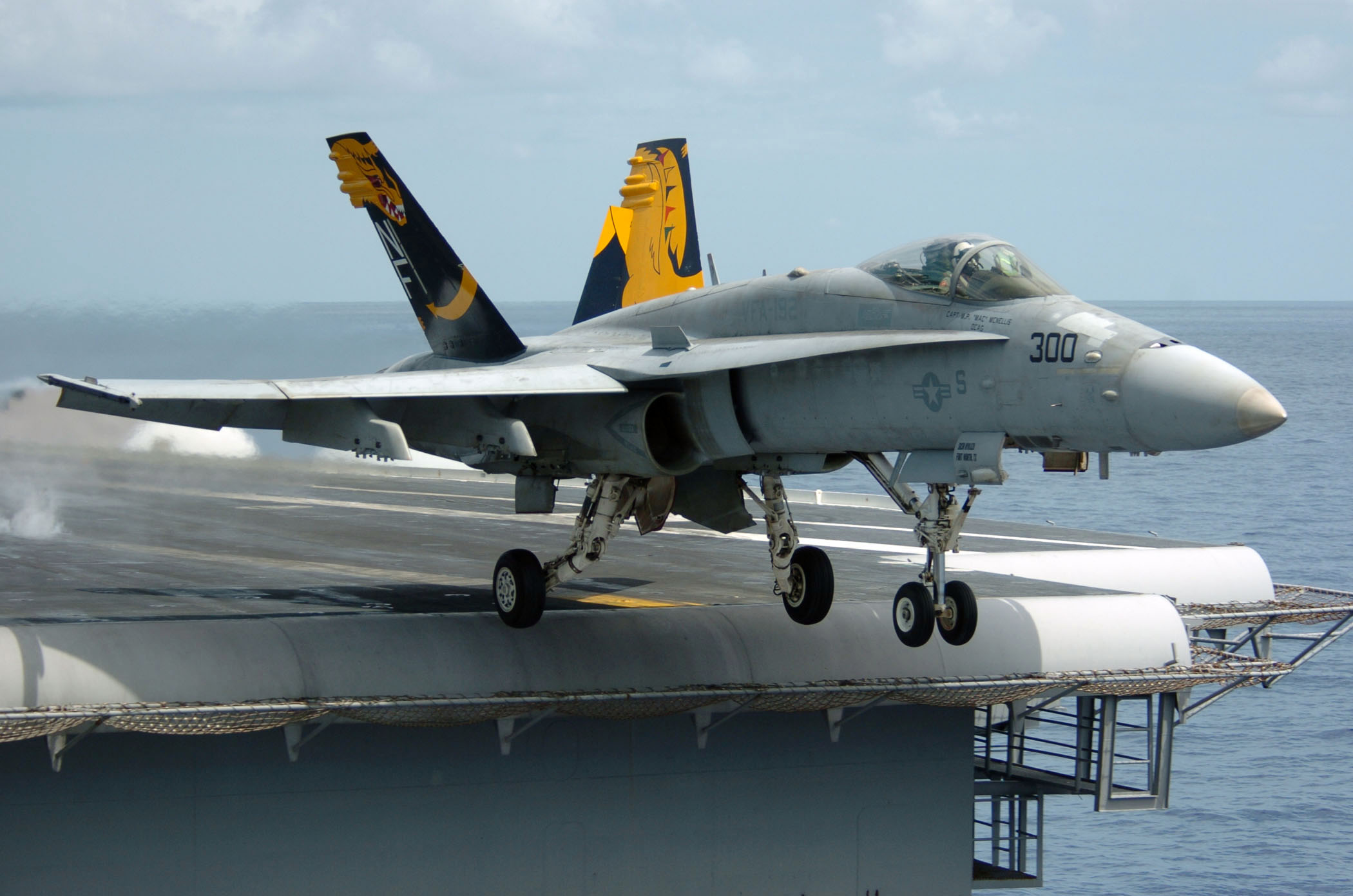
F/A-18 Hornet – twin-engine, carrier-capable, multirole fighter

== See also ==
- Century Series (US fighters of the 1950s and early 1960s)
- F-19 (hypothetical US fighter aircraft)
  - Lockheed F-117A Nighthawk
- Lockheed YF-12 Blackbird
- Northrop F-20 Tigershark
- List of military aircraft of the United States

== Bibliography ==
- Spick, Mike, ed. The Great Book of Modern Warplanes. St. Paul Minnesota: MBI, 2000. ISBN 0-7603-0893-4.
