= Bell Huey family =

American family of utility helicopters

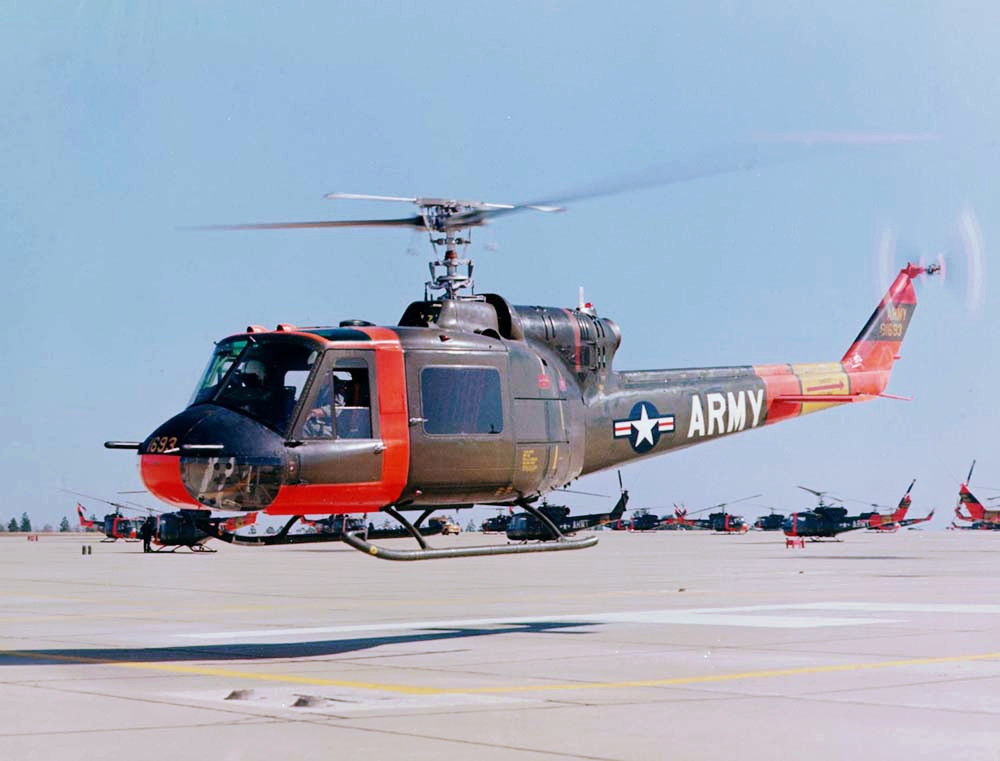
- UH-1A

The Bell Huey family of helicopters includes a wide range of civil and military aircraft produced since 1956 by Bell Helicopter. This H-1 family of aircraft includes the utility UH-1 Iroquois and the derivative AH-1 Cobra attack helicopter series and ranges from the XH-40 prototype, first flown in October 1956, to the 21st-century UH-1Y Venom and AH-1Z Viper. Although not flown in military service in the USA, the Bell 412 served in Canada and Japan and, like the UH-1Y, is a twin engine four blade rotor design based on the Bell 212.

== Military designations (UH-1 and AH-1) ==
Model	Engines	Rotor Blades	F.F. Year
UH-1/CH-118/204/5	1	2	1956
UH-1N/CH-135/212	2	2	1968
412/CH-146/UH-2	2	4	1979
UH-1Y	2	4	2001

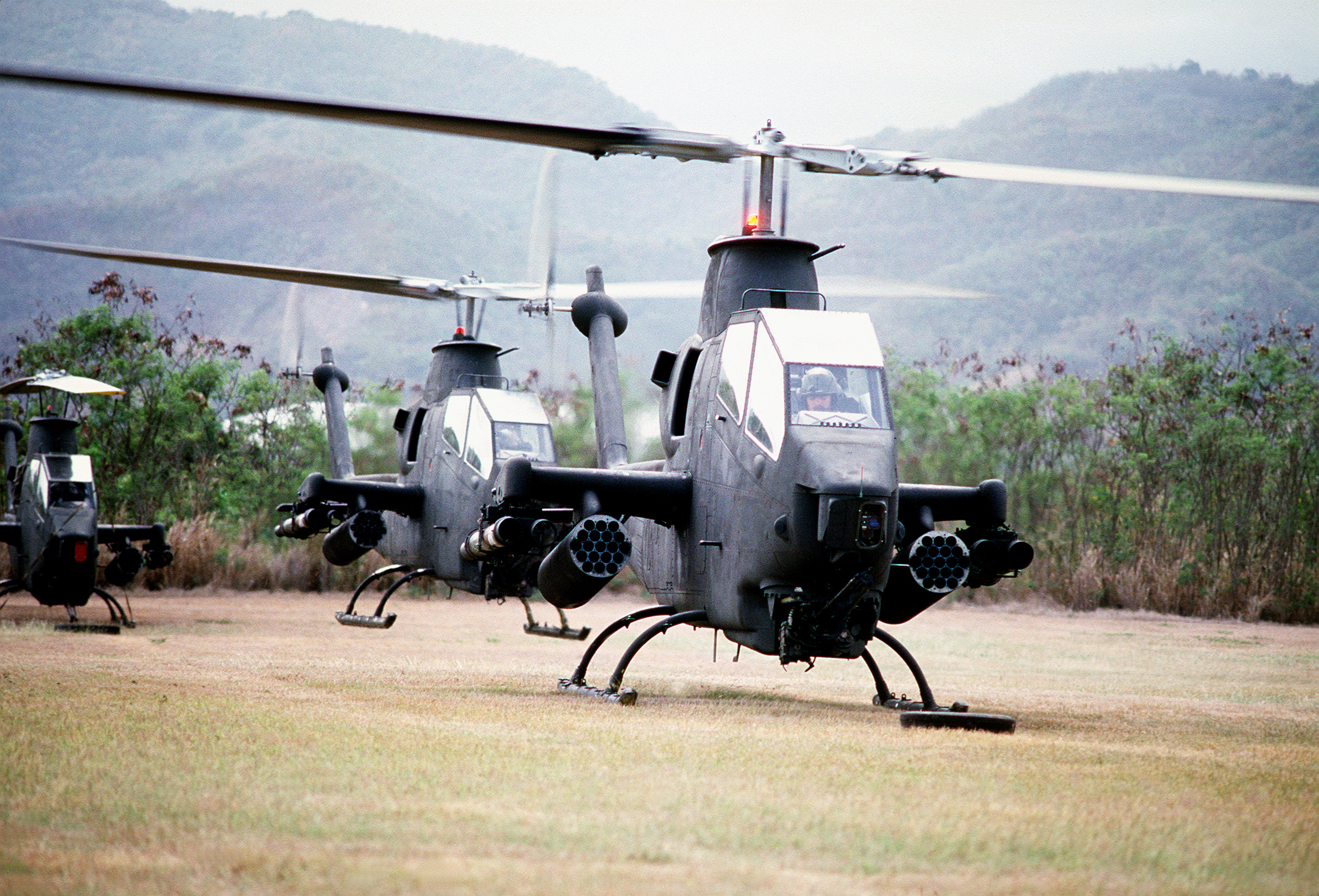
AH-1E

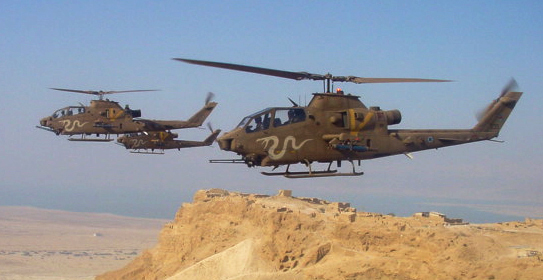
AH-1Fs of the Israeli Defence Force over Masada

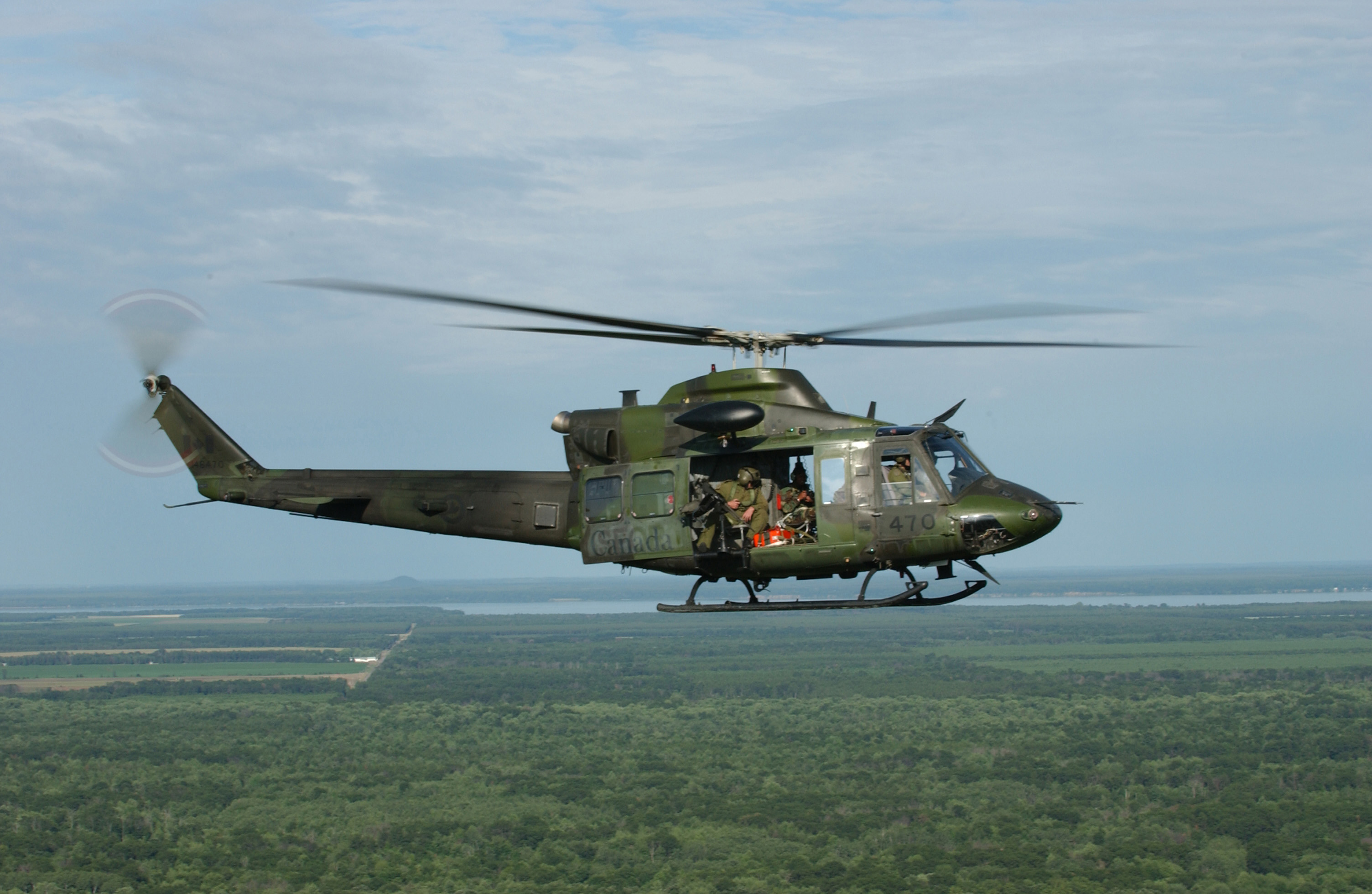
CH-146 Griffon

XH-40
The initial Bell 204 prototype. Three prototypes were built.
YH-40
Six aircraft for evaluation, as XH-40 with 12-inch cabin stretch and other modifications.
Bell 533
One YH-40BF rebuilt as a flight test bed with turbofan engines and wings.
HU-1A
Initial Bell 204 production model, redesignated as the UH-1A in 1962. The HU-1 designation gave rise to the popular but unofficial nickname "Huey".
TH-1A
UH-1A with dual controls and blind-flying instruments, 14 conversions.
XH-1A
A single UH-1A was redesignated for grenade launcher testing in 1960.
HU-1B
Upgraded HU-1A, various external and rotor improvements. Redesignated UH-1B in 1962.
YUH-1B
UH-1B prototypes
NUH-1B
A single test aircraft, serial number 64-18261.
UH-1C
UH-1B with improved engine, modified blades and rotor-head for better performance in the gunship role.
YUH-1D
Seven pre-production prototypes of the UH-1D.
UH-1D
Initial Bell 205 production model (long fuselage version of the 204). Also built under license in Germany by Dornier.
HH-1D
Rescue/fire fighting variant of UH-1D.
AH-1E
98 production Cobra gunships with the Enhanced Cobra Armament System (ECAS) featuring the M97A1 armament subsystem with a three-barreled M197 20 mm cannon. The AH-1E is also referred to as the "Upgunned AH-1S", or "AH-1S(ECAS)" prior to 1988.
UH-1E
UH-1B/C for USMC with different avionics and equipment.
NUH-1E
UH-1E configured for testing.
TH-1E
UH-1C configured for Marine Corps training. Twenty built in 1965.
AH-1F
"Modernized AH-1S", with upgraded avionics and defensive systems.
UH-1F
UH-1B/C for the USAF, with General Electric T-58-GE-3 engine of 1,325 shp.
TH-1F
Instrument and Rescue Trainer based on the UH-1F for the USAF.
UH-1G
Designation given locally to UH-1D/H gunships operating with the Khmer Air Force.
AH-1G
Initial 1966 production model of the Cobra gunship for the US Army, with one 1,400 shp Avco Lycoming T53-13 turboshaft.
JAH-1G
One Cobra helicopter modified for armament testing, including Hellfire missiles and multi-barrel cannon.
TH-1G
Two-seat dual-control Cobra trainer.

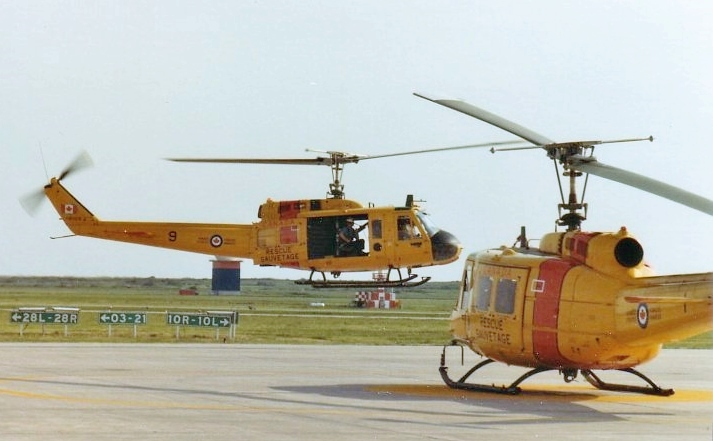
Base Rescue Moose Jaw CH-118 Iroquois helicopters 118109 and 118101 at CFB Moose Jaw, 1982

UH-1H
Improved UH-1D with a Lycoming T-53-L-13 engine of 1,400 shp; 5,435 built. Also built under license in Taiwan by AIDC.

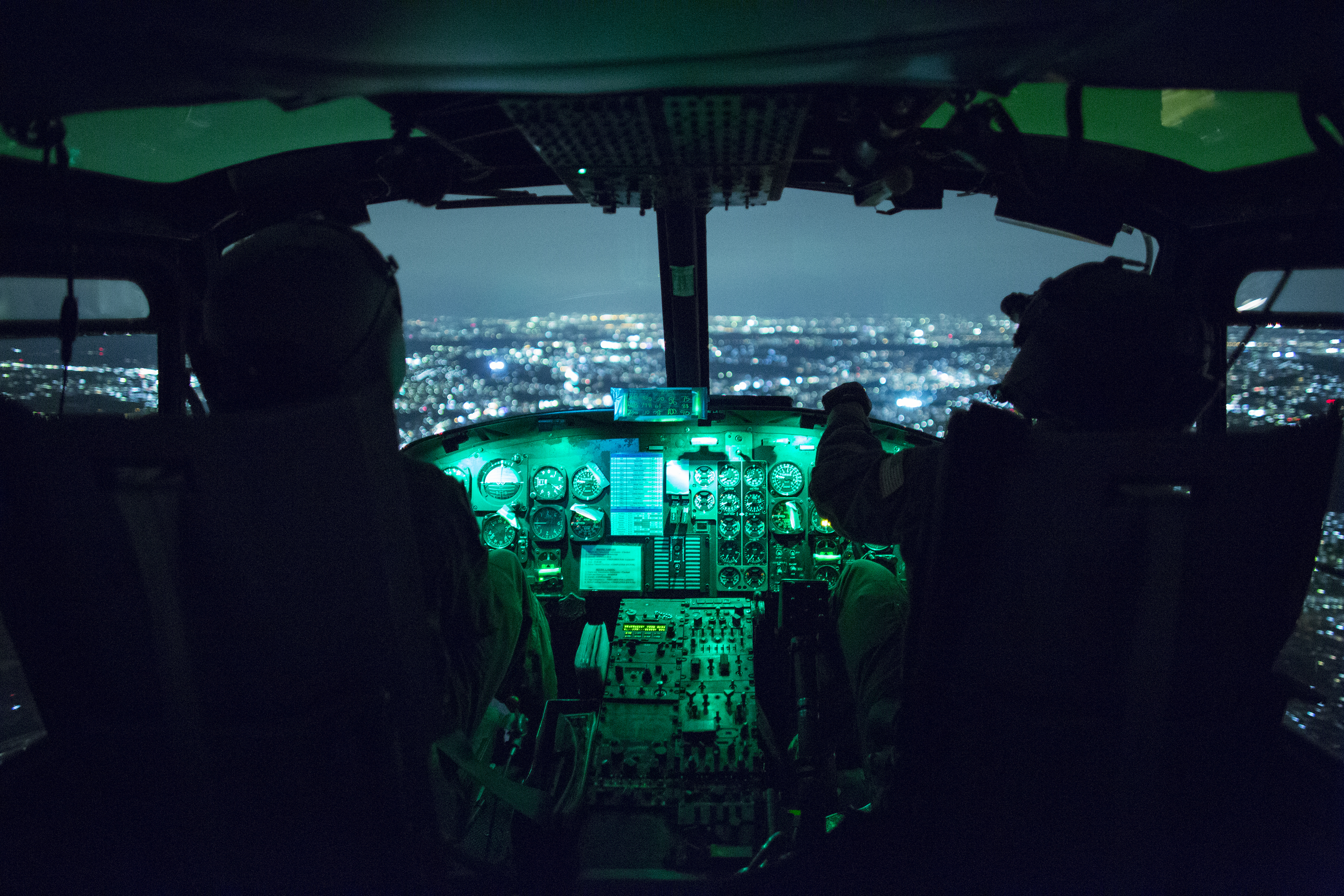
Nighttime cockpit view of UH-1N

CUH-1H
Canadian Forces designation for the UH-1H utility transport helicopter. Redesignated CH-118.
EH-1H
Twenty-two aircraft converted by installation of AN/ARQ-33 radio intercept and jamming equipment for Project Quick Fix.
HH-1H
SAR variant for the USAF with rescue hoist. 30 built.
JUH-1
Five UH-1Hs converted to SOTAS battlefield surveillance configuration with belly-mounted airborne radar.
TH-1H
Modified UH-1Hs for use as basic helicopter flight trainers by the USAF.
AH-1J
Original twin-engine SeaCobra version, subsequently upgraded and exported to Iran as AH-1J "International"
UH-1J
An improved Japanese version of the UH-1H built under license in Japan by Fuji was locally given the designation UH-1J.
HH-1K
Purpose-built SAR variant of the Model 204 for the US Navy with USN avionics and equipment. 27 built.
TH-1L
Helicopter flight trainer based on the HH-1K for the USN.
UH-1L
Utility variant of the TH-1L.
UH-1M
Gunship specific UH-1C upgrade with Lycoming T-53-L-13 engine of 1,400 shp.
UH-1N
Initial Bell 212 production model, the Bell "Twin Pac" twin-engined Huey.
HH-1N
Rescue version of the UH-1N
AH-1P
100 production aircraft with composite rotors, flat plate glass cockpit, and improved cockpit layout for nap-of-earth (NOE) flight. The AH-1P is also referred to as the "Production AH-1S", or "AH-1S(PROD)" prior to 1988.

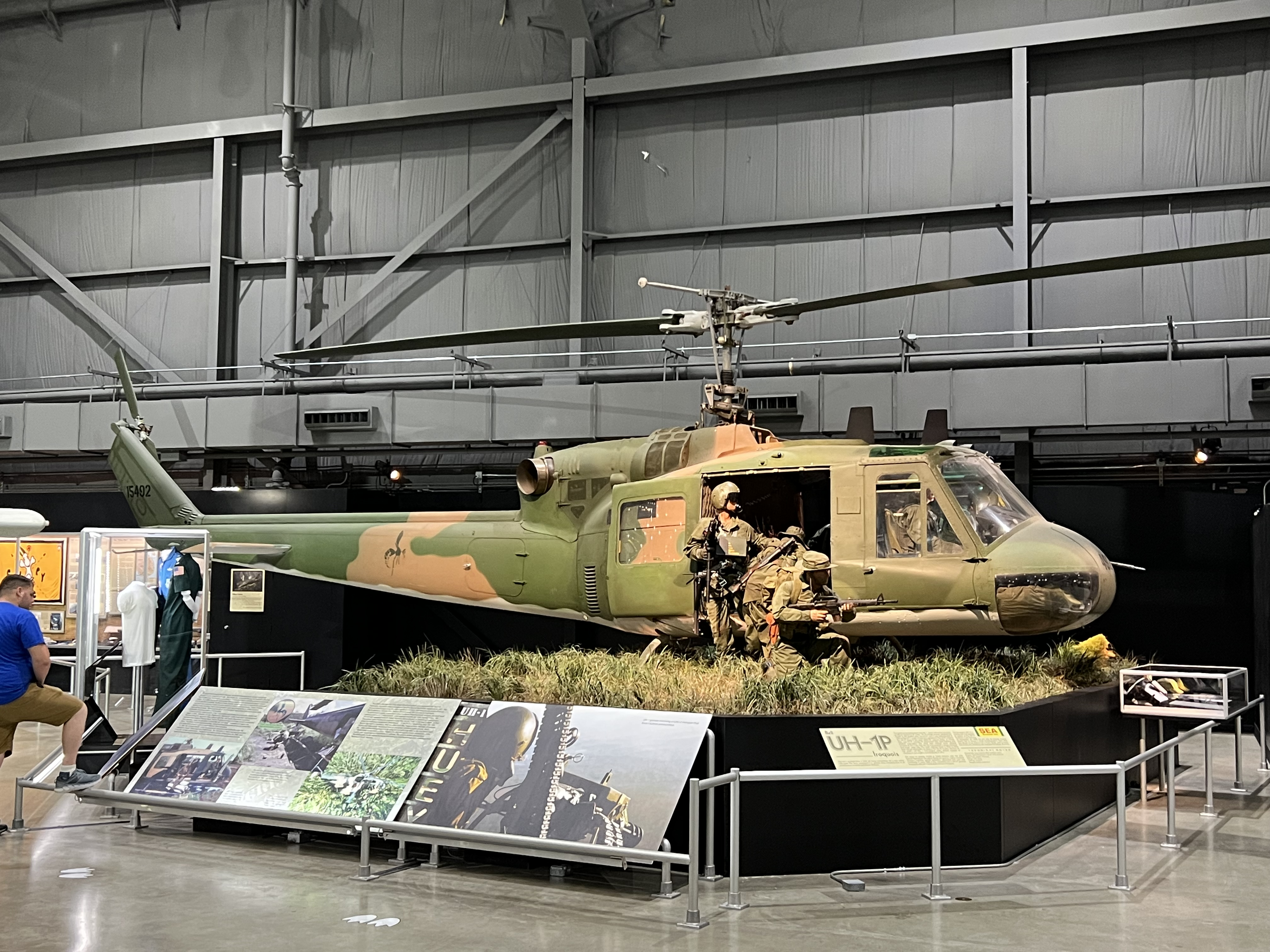
UH-1P preserved in diorama at the National Museum of the Air Force

UH-1P
UH-1F variant for USAF for special operations use and attack operations used solely by the USAF 20th Special Operations Squadron, "the Green Hornets".
YAH-1Q
Eight AH-1Gs with XM26 Telescopic Sight Unit (TSU) and two M56 TOW 4-pack launchers.
AH-1Q
Upgraded AH-1G equipped with the M65 TOW/Cobra missile subsystem, M65 Telescopic Sight Unit (TSU), and M73 Reflex sight.
YAH-1R
AH-1G powered by a T53-L-703 engine without TOW system.
AH-1RO
Proposed version for Romania as Dracula.

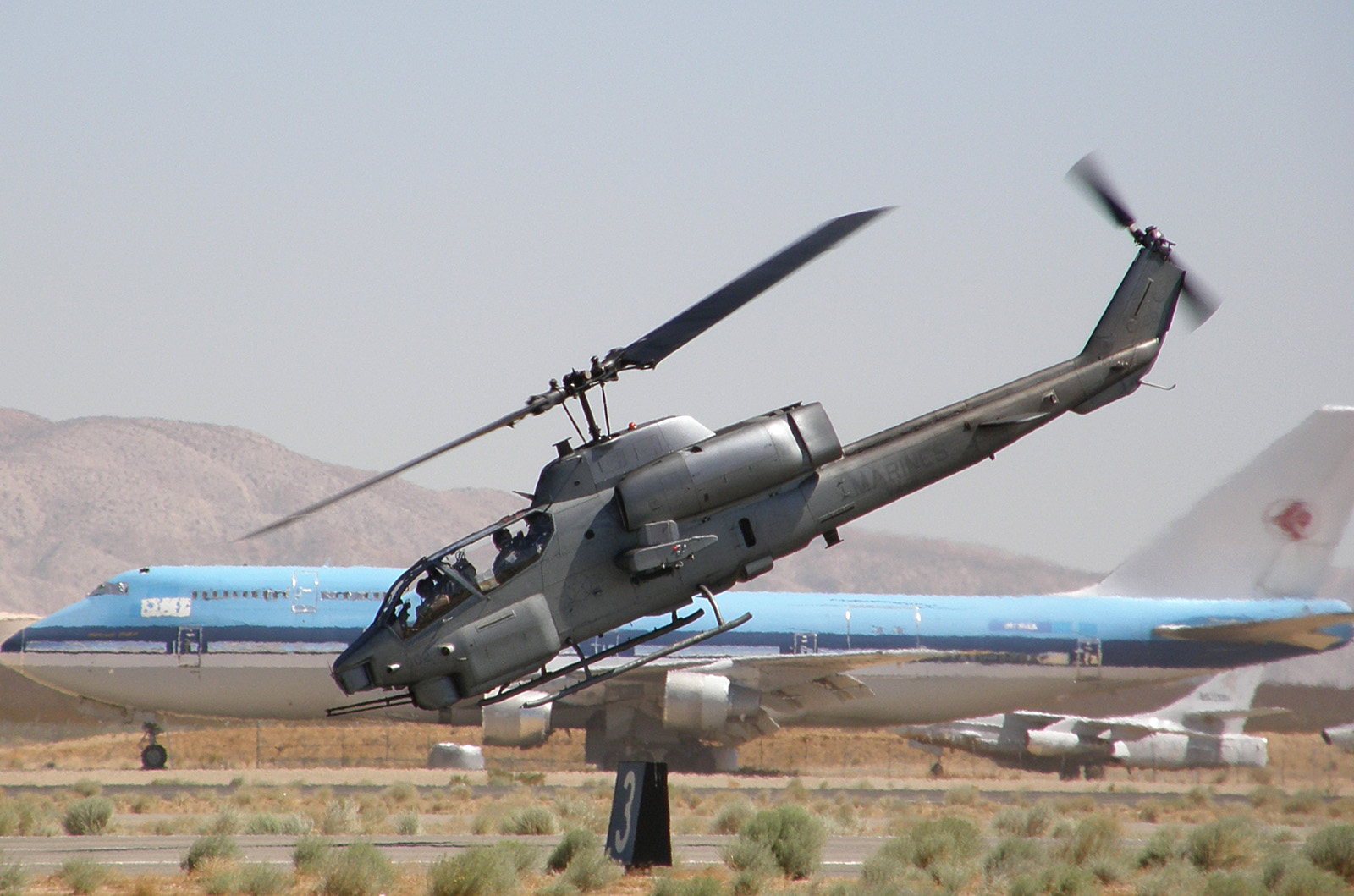
AH-1W on a training mission at the Mojave Spaceport.

YAH-1S
AH-1Q upgrade and TOW system.
AH-1S
AH-1Q upgraded with a 1,800 shp T53-L-703 turboshaft engine.
AH-1T
Named Improved SeaCobra, features an extended tailboom and fuselage and an upgraded transmission and engines.
UH-1U
Single prototype for Counter Mortar/Counter Battery Radar Jamming aircraft. Crashed at Edwards AFB during testing.
UH-1V
Aeromedical evacuation, rescue version for the US Army.
AH-1W
SuperCobra variant, nicknamed "Whiskey Cobra", day/night version with more powerful engines and advanced weapons capability.
EH-1X
Electronic warfare UH-1Hs converted under "Quick Fix IIA".
UH-1Y Venom
Named Venom, upgraded variant developed from existing upgraded late model UH-1Ns, with additional emphasis on commonality with the AH-1Z as part of the H-1 upgrade program.
AH-1Z Viper
Named Viper, or also "Zulu Cobra", it includes an upgraded 4 blade main rotor and adds the Night Targeting System (NTS). Offered as King Cobra to Turkey for its ATAK program and selected for production in 2000, but later canceled.

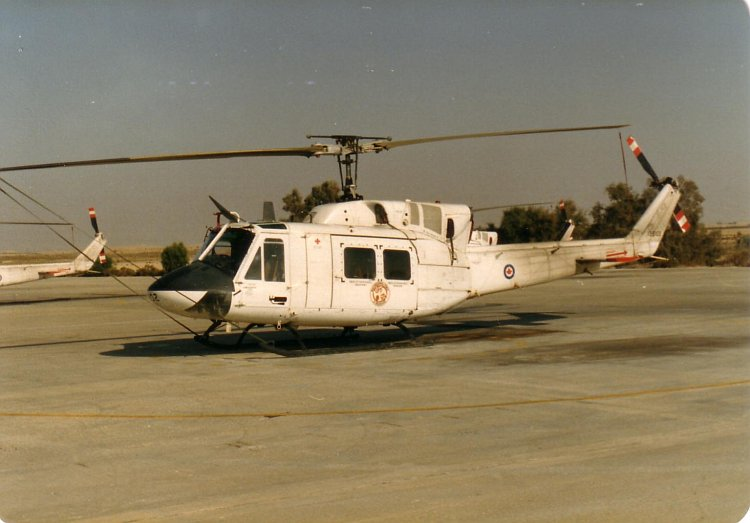
Canadian Forces CH-135 Twin Huey in service with the Multinational Force and Observers.

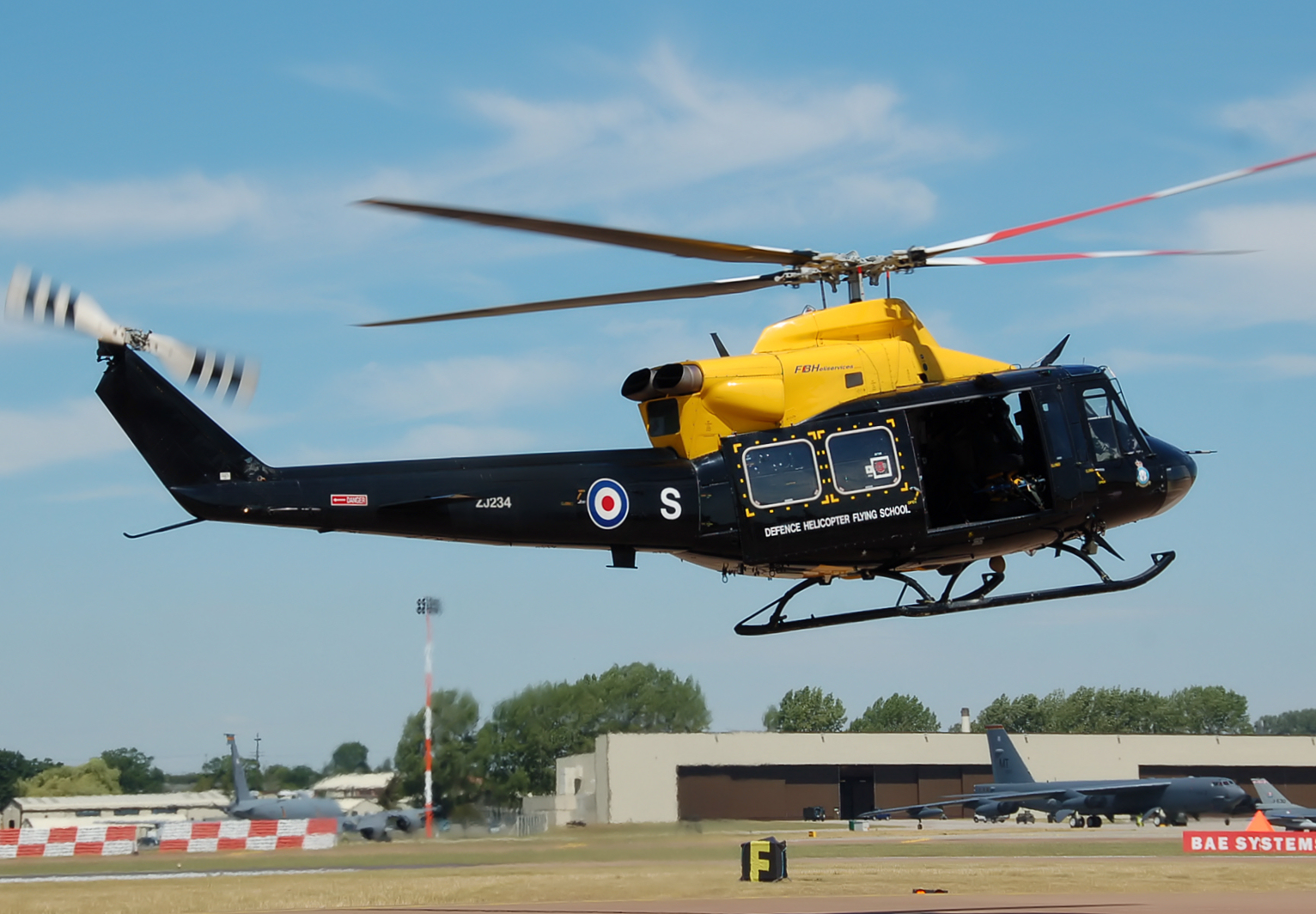
A Bell Griffin HT1 of the Defence Helicopter Flying School

UH-1/T700
Upgraded commercial version, named Ultra Huey, fitted with a 1,400-kW (1900-shp) General Electric T700-GE-701C turboshaft engine.
CH-118
Canadian Forces designation for the UH-1H
CH-135
Canadian Forces designation for the UH-1N Twin Huey
CH-146
Canadian Forces designation for a variant of the Bell 412
Griffin HT1
RAF designation for a trainer based on the 412EP
Griffin HAR2
RAF designation for a search and rescue helicopter based on the Bell 412EP

== Civil designations ==
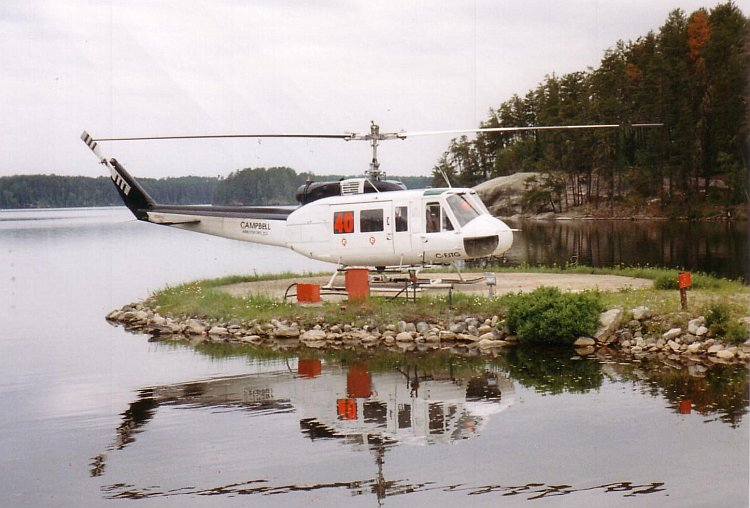
A Bell 205A-1 on firefighting duty with the Ontario Ministry of Natural Resources at Nym Lake, Ontario, Canada, 1996

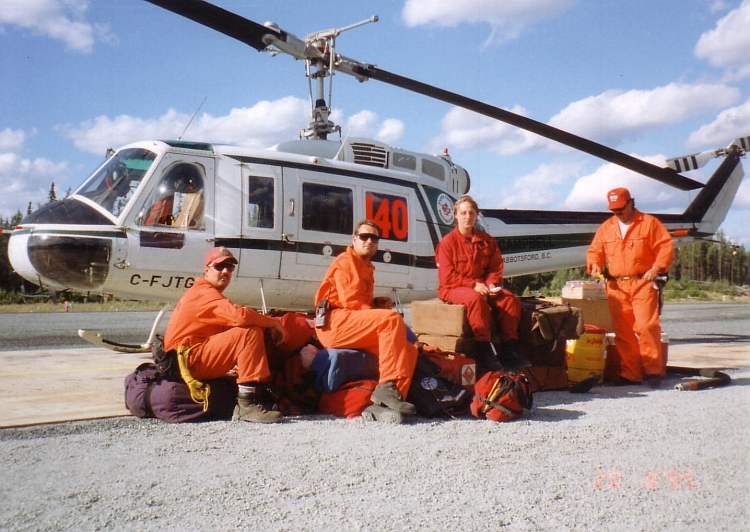
A Bell 205A-1 with its helitack firefighting crew on standby with the Ontario Ministry of Natural Resources at Sioux Lookout, Ontario, 1995

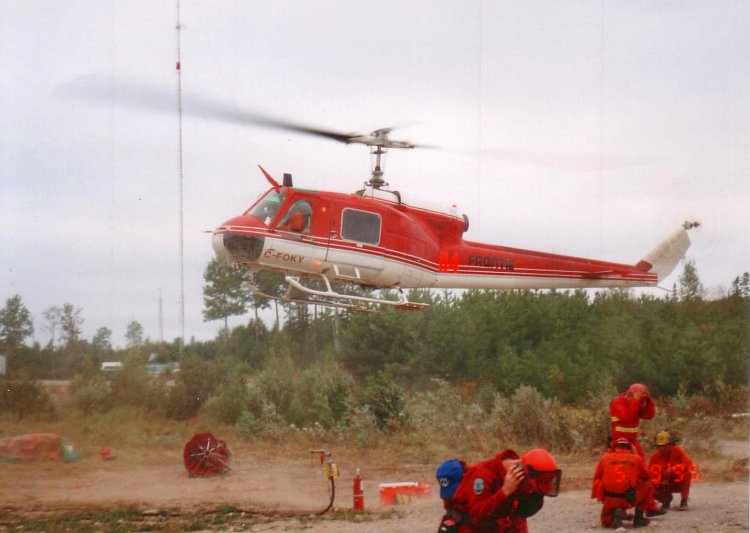
A Bell 204B (upgraded to a "C" model) arrives to pick up its Ontario Ministry of Natural Resources firefighting crew on Fire 141, 1995

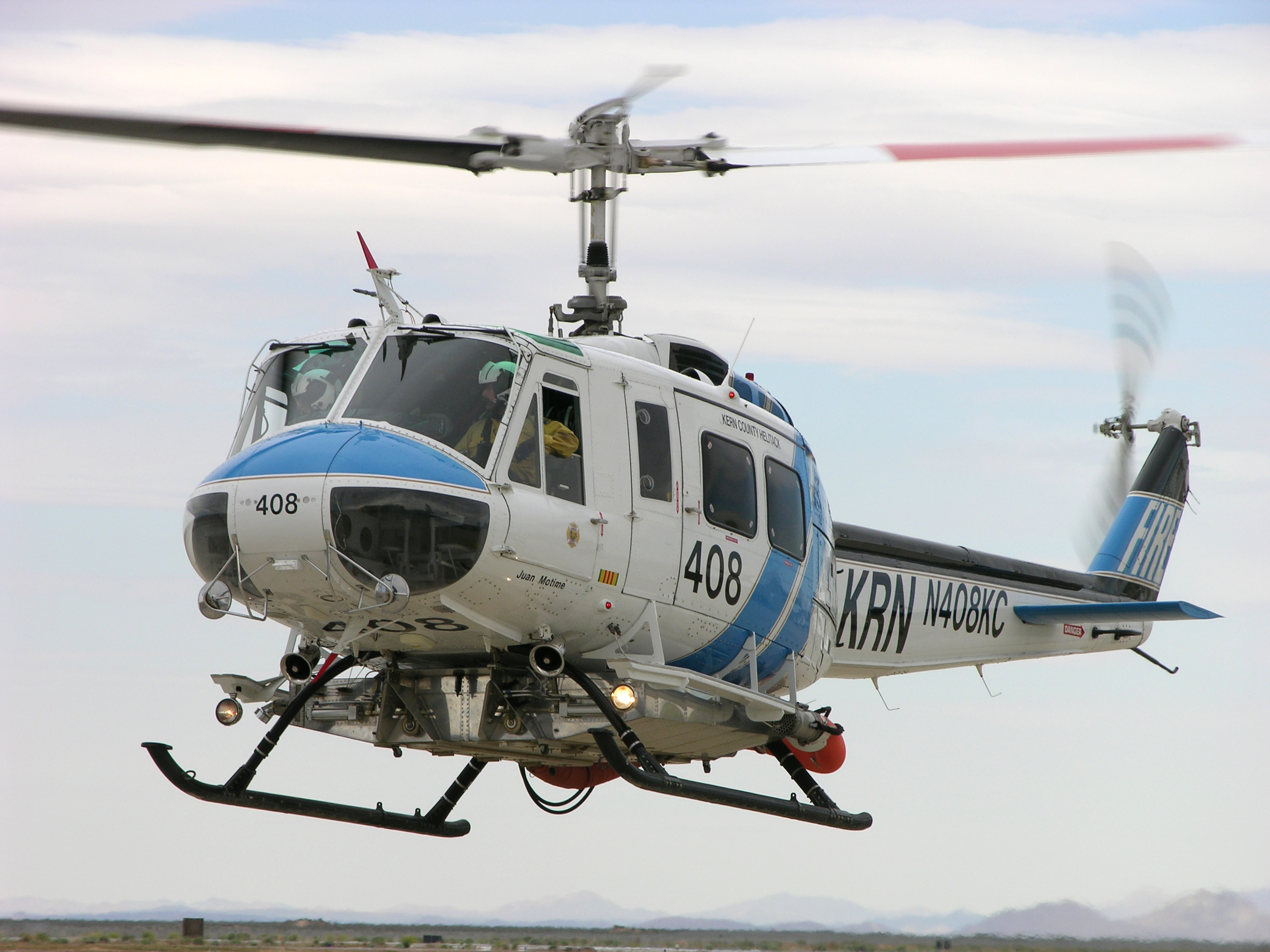
Kern County (California) Fire Department's Bell 205 based at Mojave Spaceport

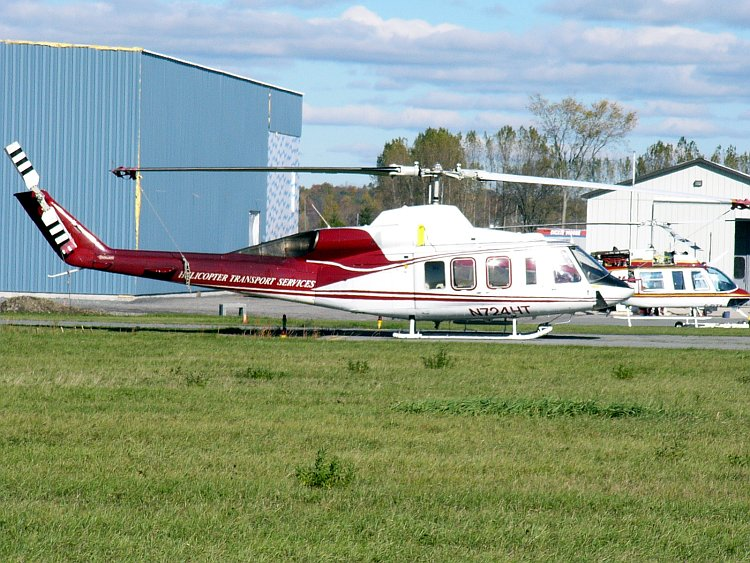
Bell 214ST

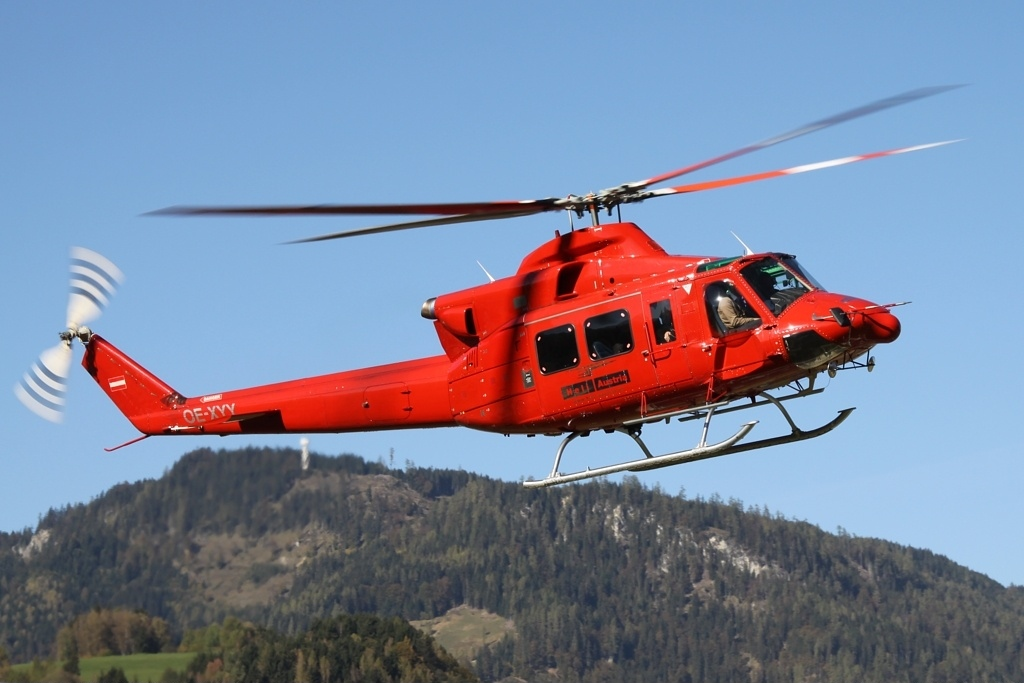
Bell 412HP of Heli Austria

Bell 204B
11 seat utility transport helicopter; the civil certified model was based at the military model 204, known by the US Army as the UH-1B.
Agusta-Bell AB 204
11 seat utility transport helicopter. Built under licence in Italy by Agusta.
Agusta-Bell AB 204AS
Anti-submarine warfare, anti-shipping version of the AB 204 helicopter.
Fuji-Bell 204B-2
11 seat utility transport helicopter. Built under licence in Japan by Fuji Heavy Industries.
Bell 205A
15 seat utility transport helicopter.
Agusta-Bell 205
15 seat utility transport helicopter. Built under licence in Italy by Agusta.
Bell 205A-1
15 seat utility transport helicopter, initial version based on the UH-1H.
Agusta-Bell 205A-1
Modified version of the AB 205.
Fuji-Bell 205A-1
15 seat utility transport helicopter. Built under licence in Japan by Fuji.
Bell 205A+
Field upgraded 205A utilizing a T53-17 engine and a 212 rotor system. Similar to the production 205B and 210.
Bell 205A-1A
A 205A-1, but with armament hardpoints and military avionics. Produced specifically for Israeli contract.
Fuji-Bell 205B
A joint Bell-Fuji commercial variant based on UH-1J, a Japanese improved model of UH-1H.
Agusta-Bell 205BG
Prototype fitted with two Gnome H 1200 turboshaft engines.
Agusta-Bell 205TA
Prototype fitted with two Turbomeca Astazous turboshaft engines.
Bell 208
Experimental twin-engine "Twin Huey" prototype.
Bell 209
Original AH-1G prototype with retractable skid landing gear.
Bell 210
15 seat upgraded 205A
Bell 211
The HueyTug, was a commercial version of the UH-1C with an upgraded transmission, longer main rotor, larger tailboom, strengthened fuselage, stability augmentation system, and a 2,650 shp (1,976 kW) Lycoming T-55-L-7 turboshaft engine.
Bell 212
15 seat twin-engined derivative of the Bell 205
Bell 214 Huey Plus
Strengthened development of the Bell 205 airframe with a larger engine
Bell 214ST
18 seat twin engined utility helicopter
Bell 249
Experimental AH-1 demonstrator version fitted with a four-bladed rotor system, an uprated engine and experimental equipment, including Hellfire missiles.
Bell 309 KingCobra
Experimental version powered by one Lycoming T-55-L-7C engine.
Bell 412
Bell 212 with a four-bladed semi-rigid rotor system.
Bell Huey II
A modified and re-engined UH-1H, significantly upgrading its performance, and its cost-effectiveness. Currently offered by Bell to all current military users of the type.
Global Eagle
Pratt & Whitney Canada name for a modified UH-1H with a new PT6C-67D engine, modified tail rotor, and other minor changes to increase range and fuel efficiency over the Bell 212.
Huey 800
Upgraded commercial version, fitted with an LHTEC T800 turboshaft engine.
Panha Shabaviz 2-75
Unlicensed version made by PANHA in Iran.
Panha 2091
Unlicensed Iranian upgrade of the AH-1J International

== See also ==
- List of Bell UH-1 Iroquois operators
- List of utility helicopters
- Super Huey UH-IX 1980s video game
