= PANHA =

Iranian helicopter manufacturer

Iran Helicopter Support and Renovation Company پشتیبانی و نوسازی هلیکوپترهای ایران
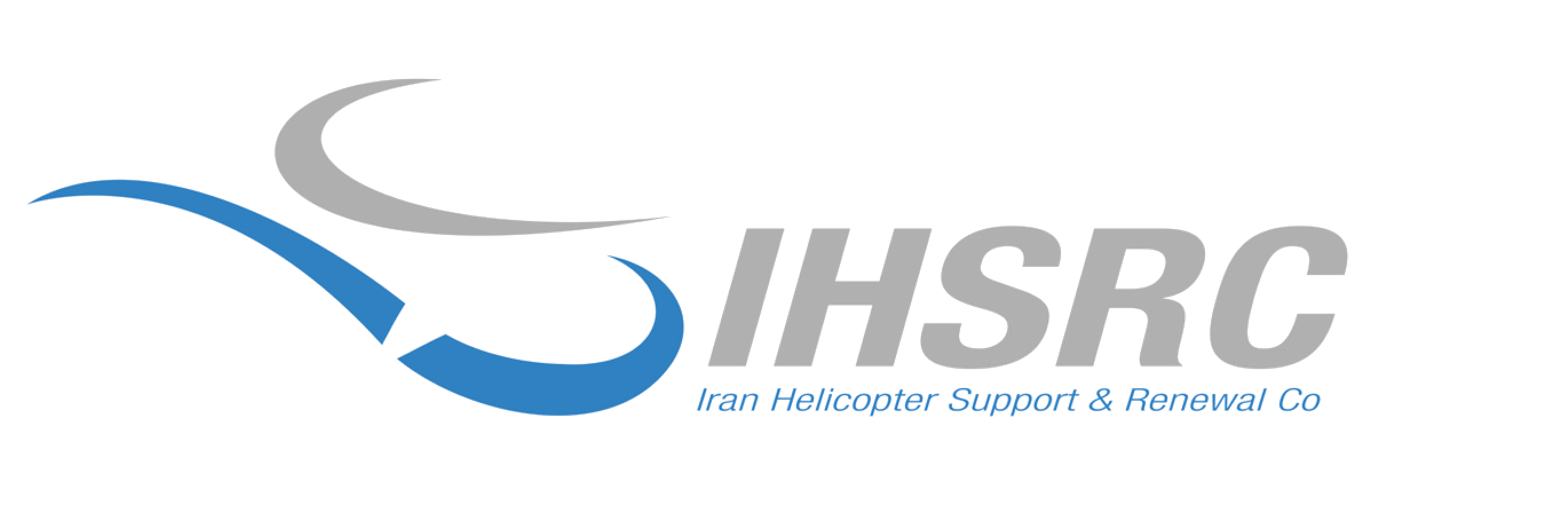
- Type: Aerospace manufacturer Government-owned corporation
- Industry: Aerospace
- Founded: 1979
- Headquarters: Tehran, Iran
- Products: Civil & Military aircraft, Civil aviation
- Parent: Ministry of Defense
- Website: www.mod.ir

Iran Helicopter Support and Renovation Company (IHSRC) (Persian: پشتیبانی و نوسازی هلیکوپترهای ایران, abbreviated as پنها, PANHA) is an Iranian helicopter manufacturing company.

== History ==
Following the purchase by Iran of some Italian helicopters from Agusta Company, it became important to establish a plant for support and repair these helicopters. This plant was named Iran Joint Helicopter Industry. Later on, after purchase of some number of helicopters from Bell, planning for expansion of this plant to support the new fleet started. Part of this expansion was to create three sections.

1. (NMP) Repair and Maintenance Centre
2. (HDMC) Main Fleet Repair Centre
3. (NICP) Logistics and Support Centre

After Iran's revolution in 1979, US embargo on Iran, and the start of the Iran-Iraq war, PANHA started its operations with a goal of supporting and maintaining helicopters in the war. After a few years, they became self-sufficient in repair and maintenance of Iran's military helicopters. In 1986, their task of repair, maintenance, and support expanded to other organizations like communication, oil, Red Cross of Iran, and power plants.

As of 2006, this organization repaired and maintained ten kinds of military and non-military helicopters in sixteen different models. In 1994, PANHA Company completed the structure of their first helicopter called Shabaviz. After this, they received their first official permit to start manufacturing commercial helicopters. PANHA has been instrumental in reverse-engineering helicopters, their upgrades and servicing the fleet of Iranian helicopters.

== Duties ==
- Repair and maintain nine kinds of helicopters in fifteen different models. (Bell 205, Bell 206, Bell 212, Bell 214, CH, RH, SH, 412, Mil 17)
- Body structure and upgrading helicopters
- Design and configuration of variety of helicopters windows and glasses
- Design and manufacturing fixtures

== Products ==
=== Helicopters ===
- Panha 2091 - based on Bell AH-1 SuperCobra
- Panha Shabaviz 2-75 - based on Bell 204/205
- Panha Shabaviz 2061 - based on Bell 206
- Homa - The twin-engine helicopter can seat 14 people and fly in different weathers.
- Sorena (helicopter)
- Saba-248 (helicopter)

== See also ==
- Iran Aviation Industries Organization
- Iranian Military Industry
