= PANHA Sorena =

Iranian utility helicopter

Sorena

General information
- Type: Utility helicopter
- National origin: Iran
- Manufacturer: PANHA
- Status: In service
- Primary user: Iran

The PANHA Sorena (Persian: هلیکوپتر سورنا) is an Iranian lightweight helicopter manufactured by PANHA (Iran Helicopter Support and Renewal Company), and was unveiled in November 2014.

== Design and development ==
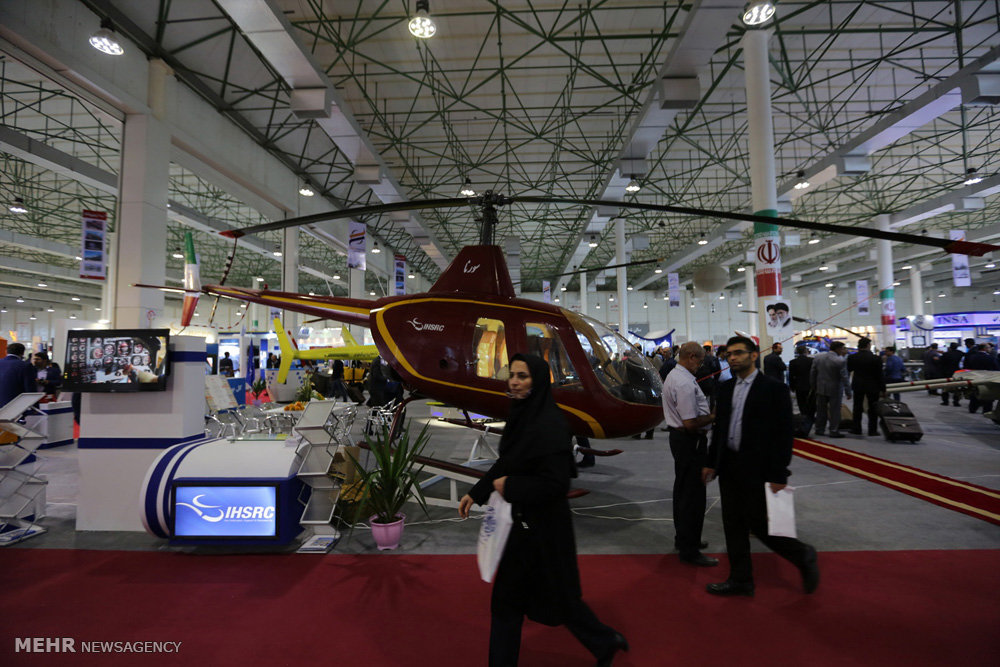
Sorena light Helicopter

Its highest lifting weight is about 1144 kg; The highest speed of Sorena-helicopter is nearly 240–160 km/h which depends upon the different conditions (160 km in standard mode); Its range is approximately five hundred and fifty five km. Surena helicopters, consisting of the costs of training, patrol, utilized in events/mission of an organization among the Red Crescent. This piston-engined helicopter is considered as a 4-seat helicopter with a 300 HP power engine; and its flight speed is 160 km. Among its other specifications are as follows: Elevation fourteen-thousand feet; Height up to 9,000 feet (2,700 meters) per second.

Sorena Helicopter was unveiled in November 2014 at the seventh Iranian Aerospace (Iran Aviation Industries Organization) show in Kish, located at the south of Iran.
