= Iranian Police Aviation =

Police Aviation Unit of FARAJA (Persian: یگان هوایی فراجا) or HAVA FARAJA (Persian: هوافراجا) is the police aviation of Iran, providing aerial support for other branches of Law Enforcement Command of Islamic Republic of Iran such as the Iranian Traffic Police and the Border Guard in pursuit, surveillance and tracking missions. The main base of the unit is the Shahid Ariyafar Airport in the southern part of Tehran.

== Aircraft ==
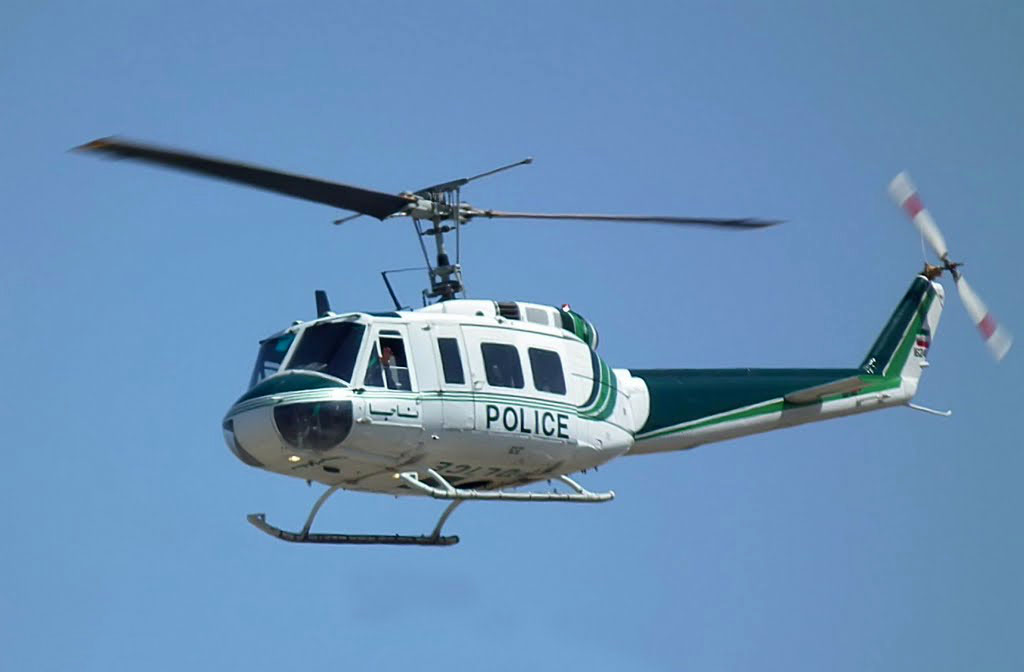
AB-205A

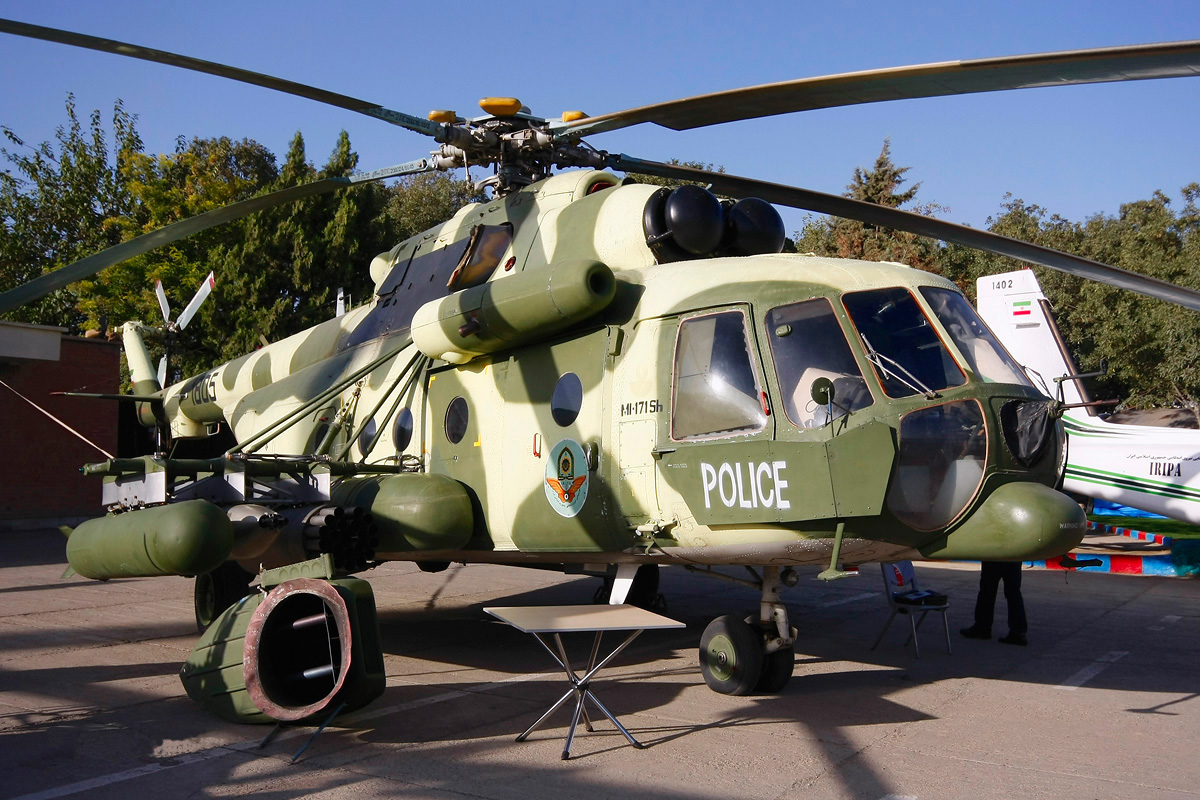
Mil Mi-171SH

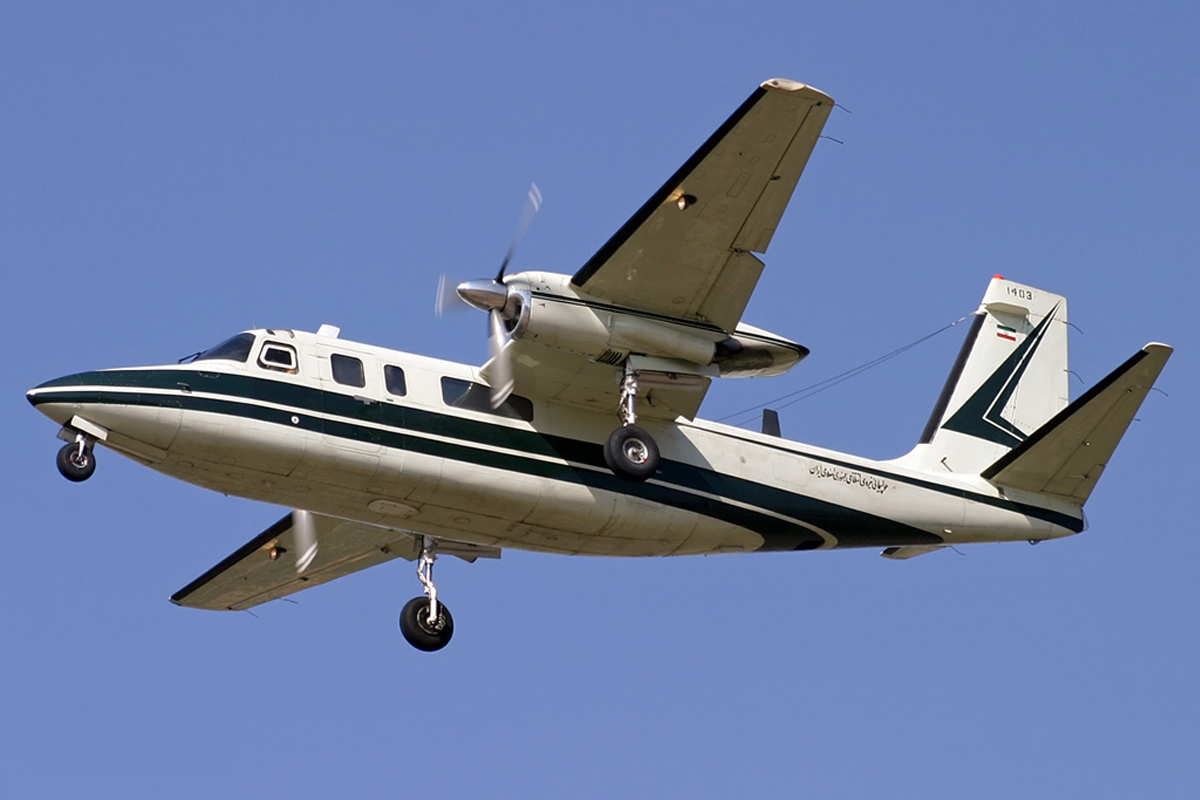
Aero Commander 690

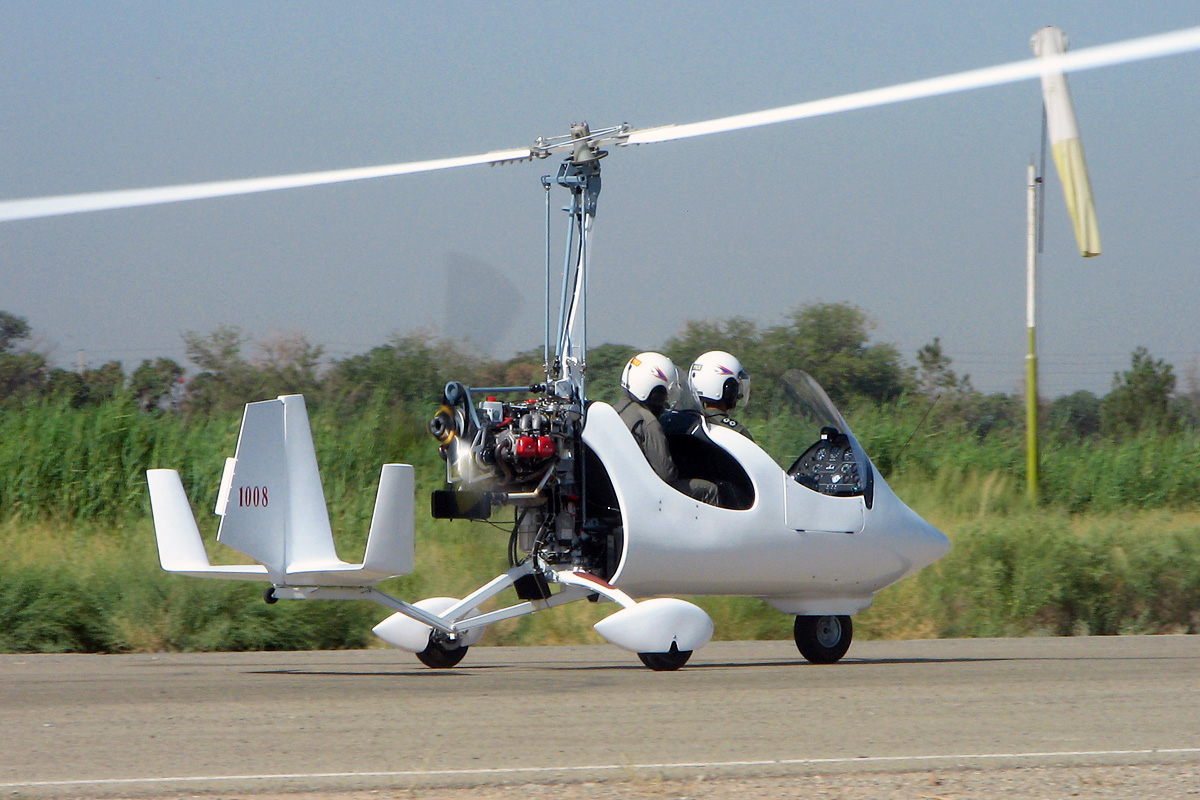
ELA 07S
