= Panha Saba-248 =

Iranian medium-lift helicopter

Saba 248 helicopter
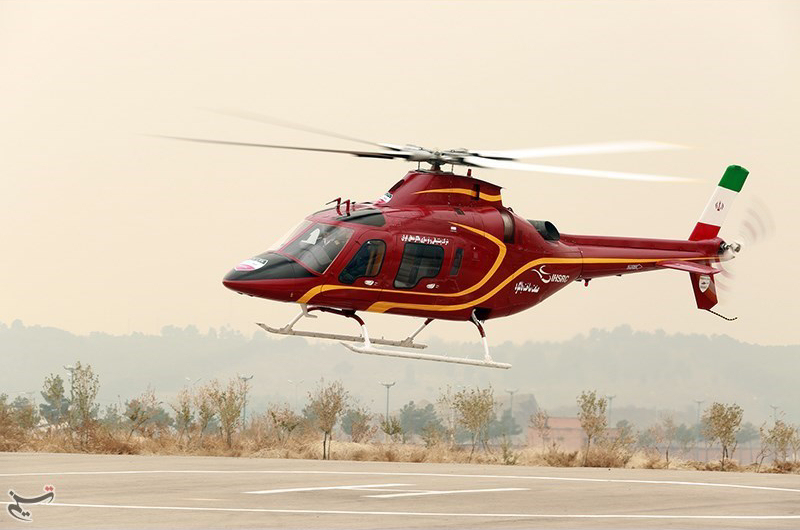

General information
- Type: Utility helicopter
- National origin: Iran
- Manufacturer: PANHA
- Designer: PANHA
- Status: In service
- Primary user: Iran
- Number built: Mass production

History
- Introduction date: 7 March 2017

The Saba-248 (Persian: صبا-۲۴۸) is an Iranian medium-lift helicopter, which was unveiled on March 7, 2017. It was entirely designed/manufactured by Iranian Defense Ministry, however, it closely resembles the AW109SP or trekker variants. Saba-248 is multi-functional with 2 engines and possesses 8 seats. This skid-equipped twin-engine, four-bladed utility helicopter is able to be deployed to a wide variety of missions, consisting of freight and passenger transport missions, aerial photography, rescue operations, and reconnaissance missions.

== Use ==
This Iranian-made helicopter is capable of being applied as air ambulance/taxi. According to Hossein Dehqan, the Iranian Defense Minister Brigadier General, it has the utilization of modern-technologies in the field of navigation/conduct/mechanical systems, high-speed, remarkable-reliability, acceptable function with sole engine, low-sound and vibration, operating temperature range of -25 °C to 55 °C and also an aerodynamic body.It is powered by two Pratt & Whitney Canada PW206C engines

== Unveiling ==
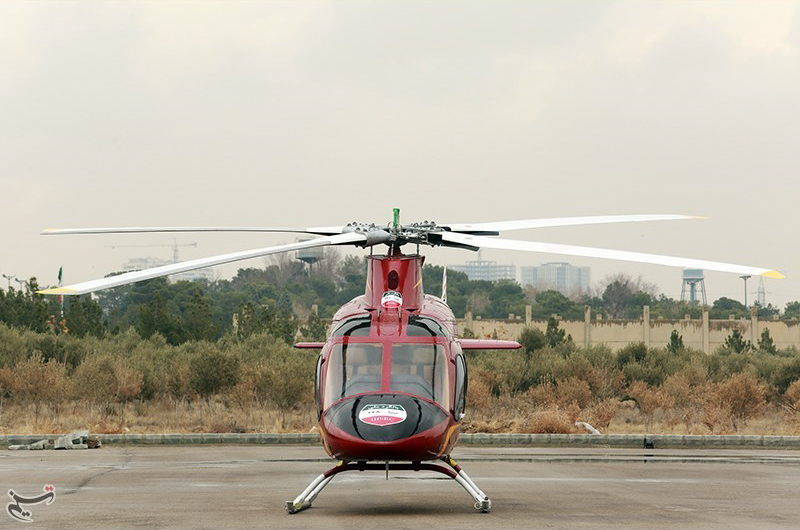
Saba 248 Helicopter

This Iranian medium-lift helicopter was unveiled on 7 March 2017 during a ceremony in Tehran, Iran; attended by Iranian Defense Minister Brigadier General Hossein Dehqan and Sorena Sattari Vice-president for Science and Technology Affairs.

== Specifications ==
Data from "PANHA Saba-248 (Good Wind): Photos, History, Specification". tvd.im.

General characteristics

- Crew: 1
- Length: 11.40 m (37 ft 5 in)
- Width: 11.25 m (36 ft 11 in)
- Height: 3.20 m (10 ft 6 in)
- Max takeoff weight: 2,900 kg (6,393 lb)
- Powerplant: 2 × Turbomeca Arrius turboshaft, 1,000 kW (1,400 hp) each

Performance

- Maximum speed: 278 km/h (173 mph, 150 kn)
- Range: 970 km (600 mi, 520 nmi)
- Rate of climb: 8.9 m/s (1,750 ft/min)
