= Bell 204/205 =

American helicopter series

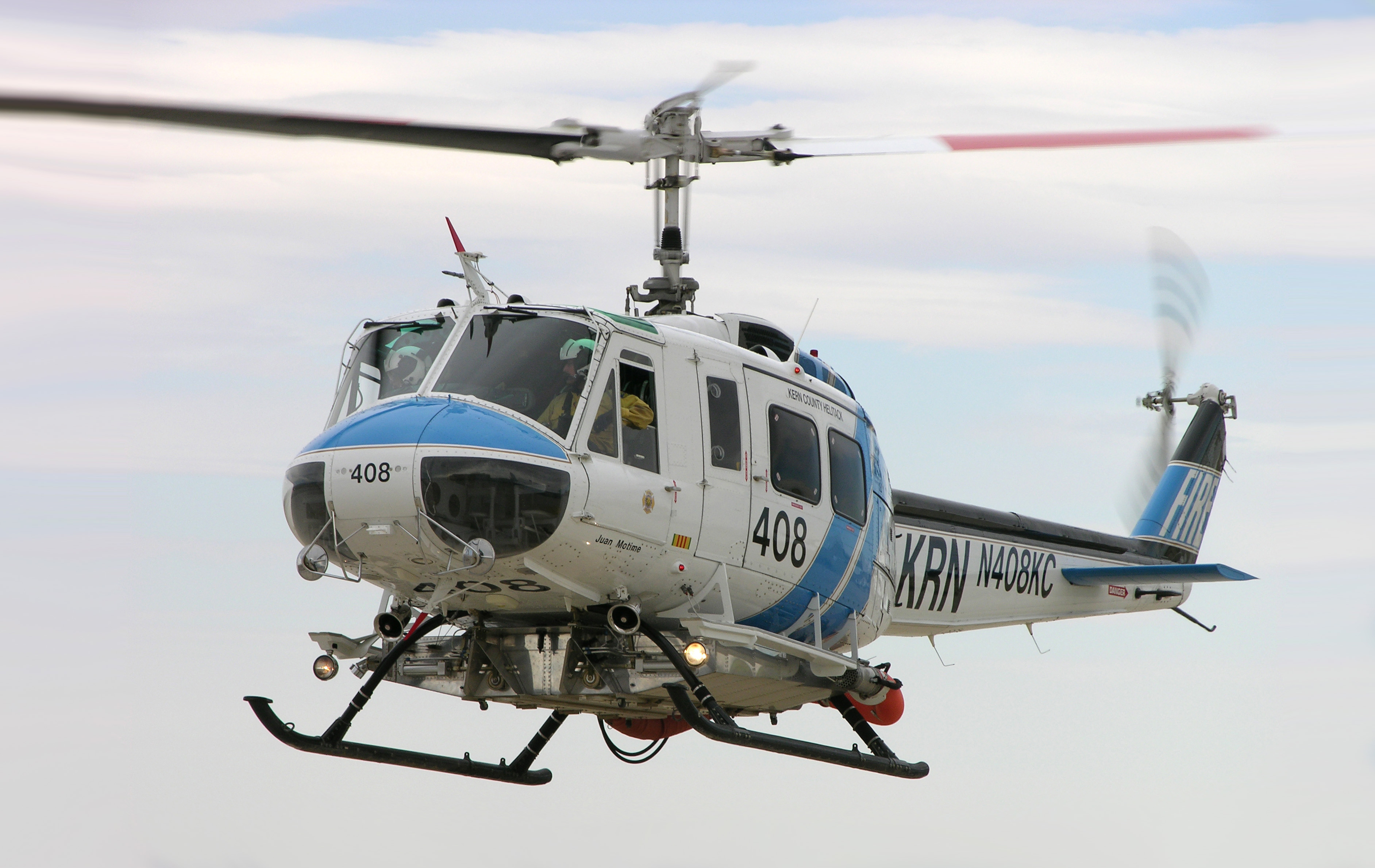
- A Kern County Fire Department Bell 205 departs from Mojave Air and Space Port

General information
- Type: Multipurpose utility helicopter
- National origin: United States
- Manufacturer: Bell Helicopter

History
- Manufactured: 1956–1980s
- Introduction date: 1959
- First flight: 22 October 1956
- Developed from: Bell UH-1 Iroquois
- Variants: Bell 212; Bell 214

The Bell 204 and 205 are the civilian versions of the UH-1 Iroquois single-engine military helicopter of the Huey family of helicopters. They are type-certificated in the transport category and are used in a wide variety of applications, including crop dusting, cargo lifting, Forestry Operations, and aerial firefighting.

== Development ==
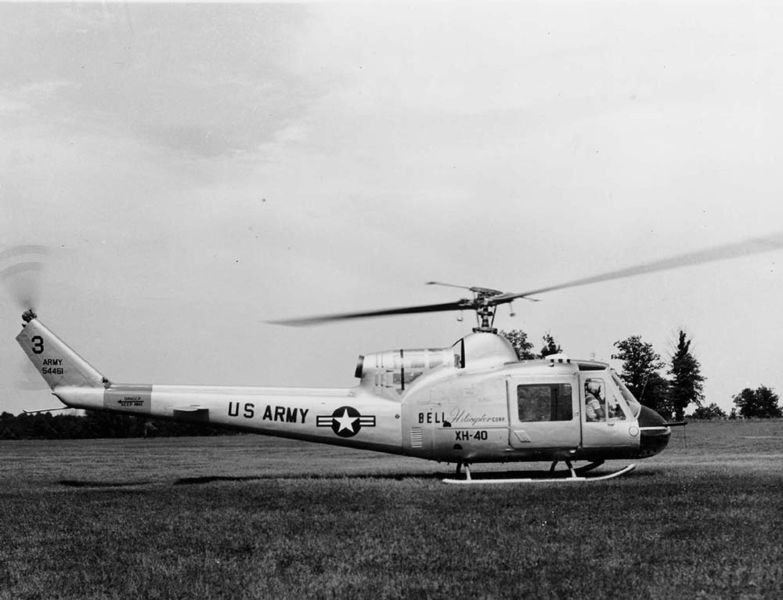
A Bell XH-40, a prototype of the UH-1 and Bell 204

Bell designed its Model 204 in response to a 1955 United States Army requirement for a utility helicopter. The 204 was a giant step forward in helicopter design, being one of the first to be powered by a turboshaft. The turboshaft engine radically improved the practicality of the helicopter due to its light weight and high power-to-weight ratio, lower fuel consumption, and lower maintenance and operating costs. The use of a turboshaft in the 204 allowed it to carry a useful payload over respectable ranges and at reasonable speeds, which resulted in the 204 and subsequent 205 becoming the most successful western helicopter series in terms of numbers built.

The civil 204B was first delivered in 1961. The subsequent Model 205A-1 is equivalent to the UH-1H, which, compared to the 204, is longer, larger, and has better performance and a more powerful engine.

Over 60 civil Model 204B helicopters had been delivered by 1967, while further examples were built by Agusta-Bell until 1973. 12,000 Model 205s (including civil 205A-1s) were built by Bell and Agusta-Bell up to the early 1980s. Numerous ex-military 204s and 205s were converted for commercial use.

== Variants ==
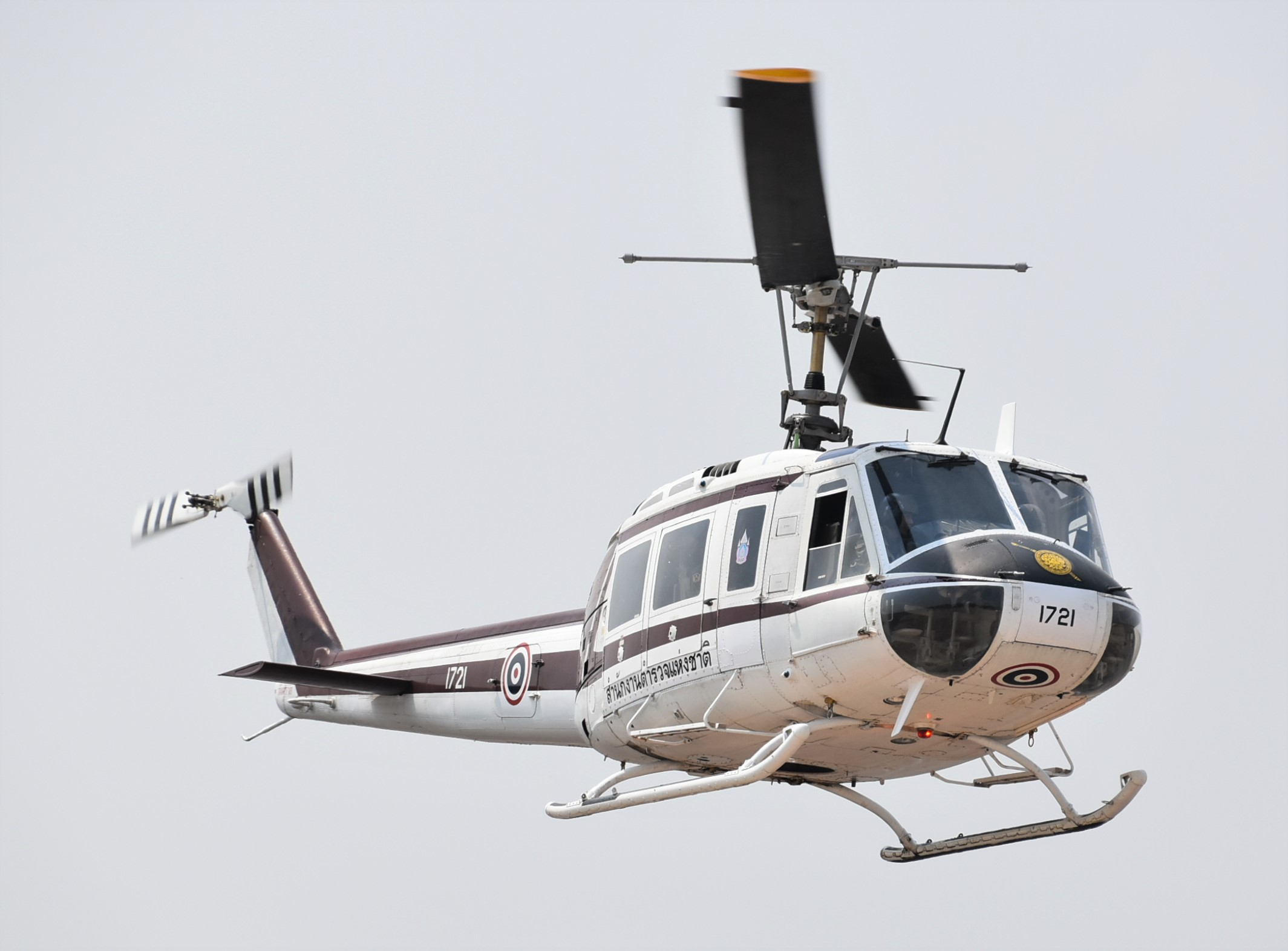
A Bell 205A-1, used by Royal Thai Police

=== Bell 204 ===
Bell Helicopter's company designation of the UH-1B.

- Bell 204B – Civil or military utility transport helicopter, derived from the UH-1B. Powered by a Lycoming T53-L-09A, max weight was 8,500 lbs, max passengers, ten.
- Agusta 204B – Civil or military utility transport helicopter. Built under licence in Italy by Agusta in 1963–1967. Also known as Agusta-Bell AB 204
- Fuji-Bell 204B/204B-2 – Civil utility transport helicopter. Built under licence in Japan by Fuji Heavy Industries alongside military HU-1B and HU-1H for the Japan Ground Self Defense Force.
- Hkp3 - 22 examples of the 204B built in Italy for the Swedish Armed Forces (twelve helicopters for the Army, seven for the Air Force, and three for the Swedish Emergency troops (procured through the UN).

=== Bell 205 ===
Bell Helicopter's company designation of the UH-1H.

- Bell 205A – Civil or military utility transport helicopter. Powered by one T53-L-11A, max weight 8,500 pounds, max passenger, 14.
  - Agusta-Bell 205 – Civil or military utility transport helicopter. Built under licence in Italy by Agusta.
- Bell 205A-1 – Civil or military utility transport helicopter version, initial version based on the UH-1H. Powered by one T53-L-13A, max weight 9,500 pounds (10,500 for external loads), max passengers, 14.
  - Agusta-Bell 205A-1 – Modified version of the AB 205.
- Fuji-Bell 205B – a joint Bell-Fuji commercial variant based on UH-1J, a Japanese improved model of UH-1H.
- Bell 210 – Bell Helicopter's designation for a UH-1H, remanufactured and sold as a new aircraft. Powered by one T53-L-17B, same weight capacities as the 205B.

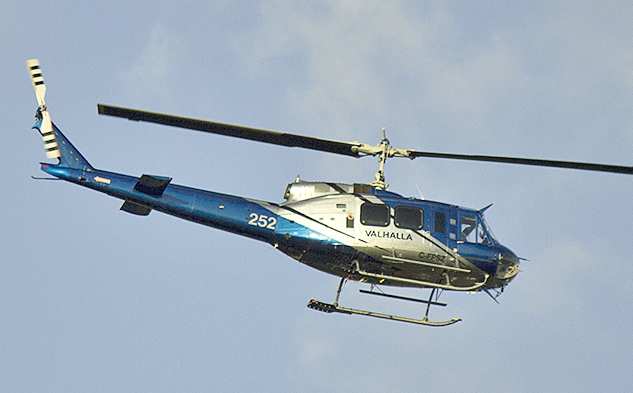
A Bell 205A-1 on firefighting duty with Valhalla Helicopters

=== Experimental models ===
- Agusta-Bell 205BG – Prototype fitted with two Gnome H 1200 turboshaft engines.
- Agusta-Bell 205TA – Prototype fitted with two Turbomeca Astazous turboshaft engines.
- Bell 208 – In 1965, Bell experimented with a single twin-engine Model 208 "Twin Huey" prototype, which was a UH-1D fitted with Continental XT67-T-1 twin-pack engine module, consisting of two power turbines driving a common gearbox. This exercise was performed as an experiment using company funds.

=== Upgrades ===
- 205A-1++ – Field-upgraded 205A utilizing a T53-L-17 engine and a 212 drivetrain. Similar to the production 205B and 210.
- Advanced 205B – Proposed upgraded Japanese version.
- Global Eagle – Pratt & Whitney Canada name for a modified UH-1H with a new PT6C-67D engine, modified tail rotor, and other minor changes reported to increase range and fuel efficiency over the Bell 212.
- Huey 800 – Upgraded commercial version, fitted with an LHTEC T800 turboshaft engine.

=== Derivatives ===
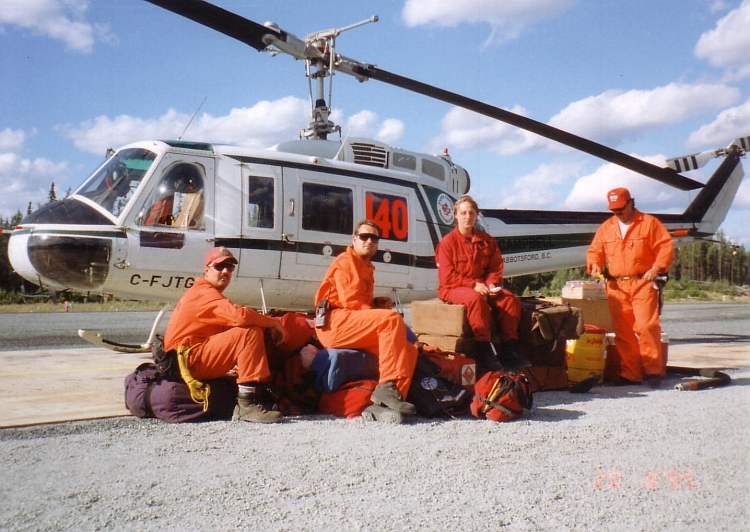
A Bell 205A-1 with its helitack firefighting crew with the Ontario Ministry of Natural Resources in 1995

- Bell 211 – The HueyTug, was a commercial version of the UH-1C with an upgraded transmission, longer main rotor, larger tailboom, strengthened fuselage, stability augmentation system, and a 2,650 shp (1,976 kW) T55-L-7 turboshaft engine.
- Bell 212 – Bell Helicopter's company designation for the UH-1N.
- Bell 214 Huey Plus – Strengthened development of the Bell 205 airframe with a larger engine; optimized for "hot and high" conditions. Later developed into the larger, twin-engine Bell 214ST.
- Bell 412 – Bell 212 with a four-blade semi-rigid rotor system.
- Panha Shabaviz 2-75 – is an Iranian utility helicopter built by the Iranian Helicopter Support and Renewal Company. It is a reverse engineered version of the Bell 205s which were sold to the government of Mohammad Reza Pahlavi. The first example was built in 1998 and the type was publicly unveiled the following year. It has been manufactured locally in Iran since 2002 and is in active service with the Iranian military and government. It has also been claimed that it can be modified to carry light weaponry.

== Operators ==
=== Military operators ===
For all military operators, regardless of the actual model, see List of UH-1 Iroquois operators

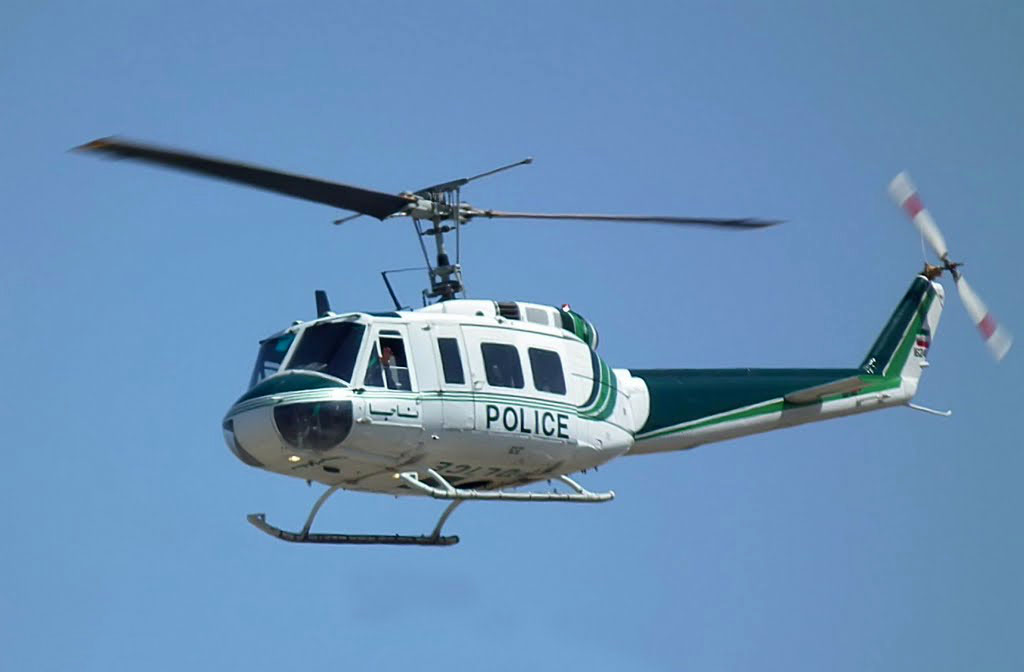
Iranian Police Aviation AB-205A

=== Government operators ===
Canada

- National Research Council

Iran

- Law Enforcement Force of Islamic Republic of Iran (Police Aviation)

Thailand

- Royal Thai Police
- Royal Thai Navy

Taiwan

- National Airborne Service Corps

United States

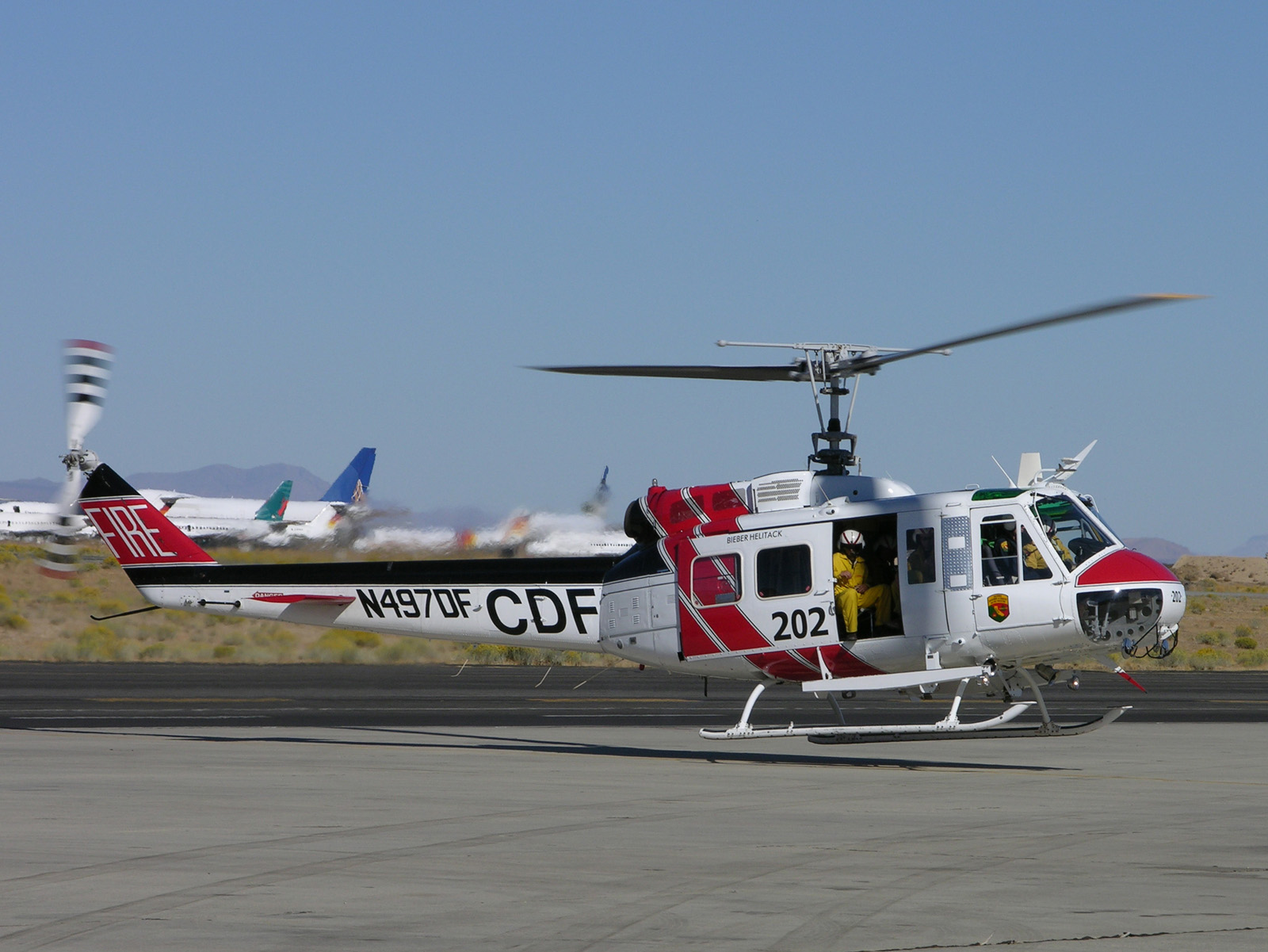
California Department of Forestry "Super Huey", formerly an EH-1H, assigned to the Bieber Helitack crew, takes off from the Mojave Airport

- California Department of Forestry and Fire Protection
- Florida Division of Forestry
- Kern County Fire Department
- Las Vegas Metropolitan Police Department
- NASA
- Orange County Fire Authority
- San Bernardino County Sheriff's Department
- San Diego County Sheriff's Office
- United States Border Patrol
- Ventura County Sheriff's Department
- Washington State Department of Natural Resources

== Specifications (204B) ==

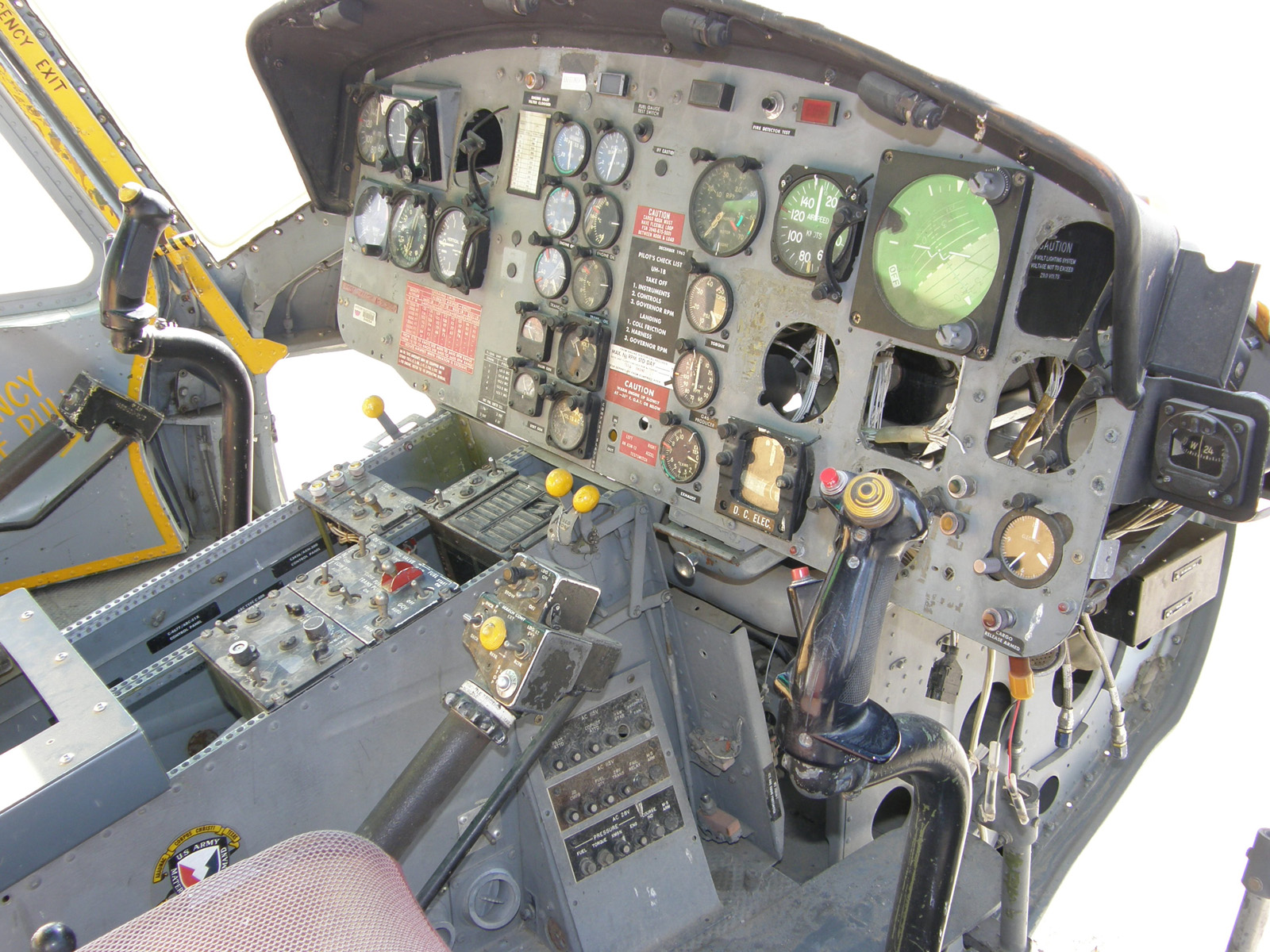
Bell 204 instrument panel

Data from The International Directory of Civil Aircraft

General characteristics

- Crew: 1 or 2
- Capacity: 8-9 passengers / 3,000 lb (1,361 kg) equivalent cargo
- Length: 41 ft 8 in (12.70 m)
- Height: 14 ft 7 in (4.45 m)
- Empty weight: 4,600 lb (2,087 kg)
- Max takeoff weight: 9,500 lb (4,309 kg)
- Powerplant: 1 × Lycoming T53-L-11A turboshaft engine, 1,100 shp (820 kW)
- Main rotor diameter: 48 ft (15 m)
- Main rotor area: 1,808 sq ft (168.0 m^{2})

Performance

- Maximum speed: 120 kn (140 mph, 220 km/h)
- Cruise speed: 111 kn (128 mph, 206 km/h)
- Range: 300 nmi (350 mi, 560 km)
- Service ceiling: 19,390 ft (5,910 m)
- Rate of climb: 1,755 ft/min (8.92 m/s)

== See also ==
- U.S. helicopter armament subsystems

Related development

- Bell 212
- Bell 214
- Bell 412
- Bell AH-1 Cobra
- Bell UH-1 Iroquois
- Bell UH-1N Twin Huey

Related lists

- List of active United States military aircraft

== Bibliography ==
- Chant, Christopher, Fighting Helicopters of the 20th Century, Graham Beehag Books, Christchurch, Dorset, England (1996).
- Debay, Yves, Combat Helicopters, France: Histoire & Collections (1996)
- Drendel, Lou. UH-1 in Action. Carrollton, TX: Squadron Signal. ISBN 0-89747-179-2
- Francillon, Rene, J. Vietnam: The War in the Air New York: Arch Cape Press (1987)
- Mesko, Jim, Airmobile: The Helicopter War in Vietnam, Squadron Signal Publications (1984).
- Specifications for 204, 205 and 214 Huey Plus
- Mutza, Wayne. UH-1 Huey in Colors. Carrollton, TX: Squadron Signal. ISBN 0-89747-279-9
- "Pentagon Over the Islands: The Thirty-Year History of Indonesian Military Aviation". Air Enthusiast Quarterly (2): 154–162. n.d. ISSN 0143-5450.

The initial version of this article was based on a public domain article from Greg Goebel's Vectorsite.
