= List of Bell UH-1 Iroquois operators =

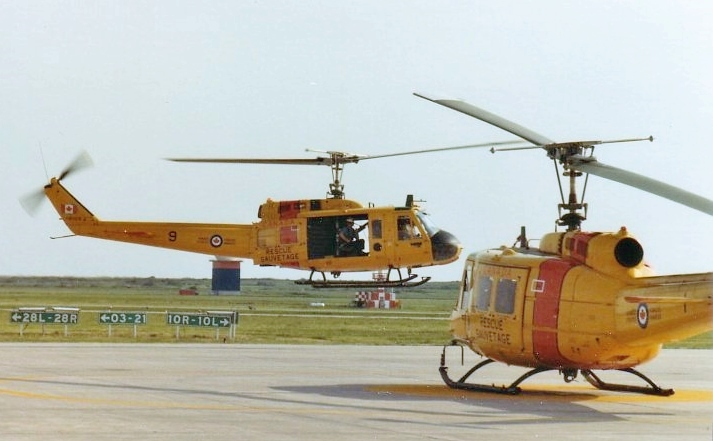
Canadian Forces Base Rescue Moose Jaw CH-118 Iroquois helicopters at CFB Moose Jaw, 1982

A map displaying current Bell UH-1 Iroquois operators in blue, with former operators in red, though the listing is not complete

This page is a list of countries which have used or are current users of the Bell UH-1 Iroquois or are military users of the Bell 204 and 205, along with their military units.

Due to the widespread use of this aircraft, the list may not be comprehensive or up to date; it is one of the most widely used helicopters in the late 20th century.

== Operators ==
=== Afghanistan ===
- Afghan Air Force

=== Albania ===
- Albanian Air Force

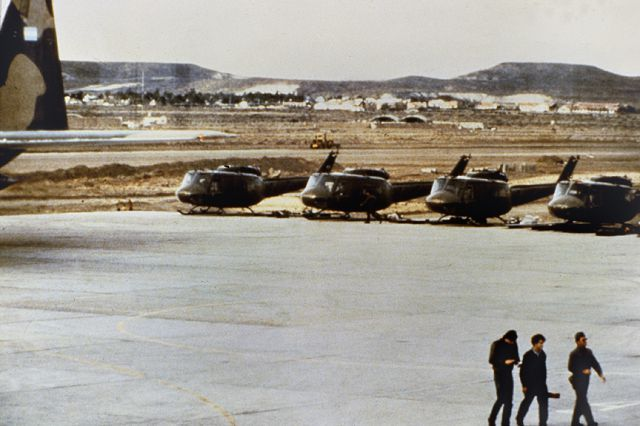
Argentine Hueys (without rotors) during the Falklands War

=== Argentina ===
- Argentine Army
- Argentine National Gendarmerie

=== Belize ===
- Belize Defence Force

=== Brazil ===
- Brazilian Air Force
- PMERJ

=== Bolivia ===
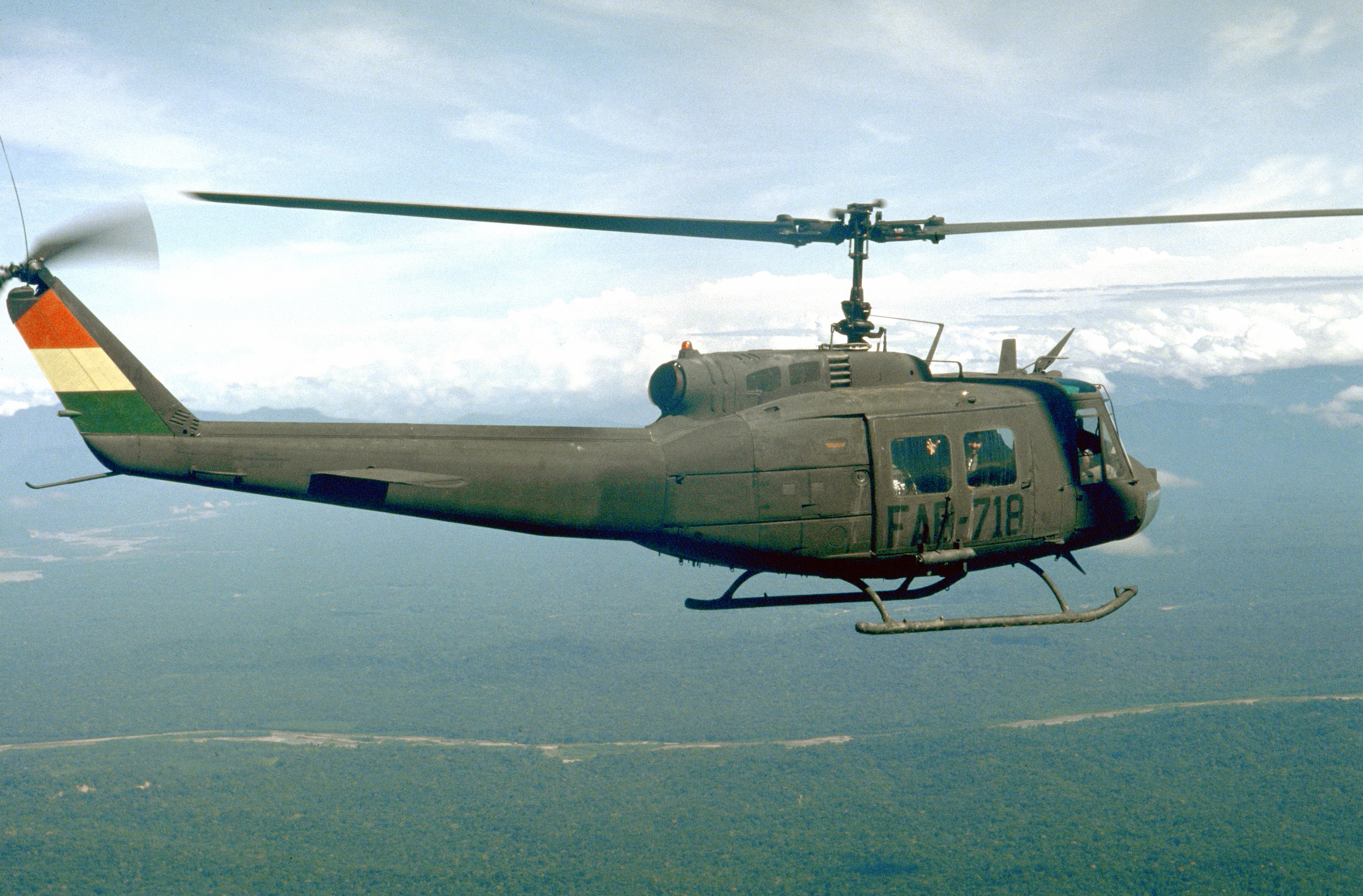
Bolivian Air Force UH-1H

- Bolivian Air Force

=== Bosnia and Herzegovina ===
- Armed Forces of Bosnia-Herzegovina: Four Huey IIs delivered on December 4, 2021.

=== Burkina Faso ===
- Armed Forces of Burkina Faso – 2 UH-1H

=== Canada ===
Ten, nine serving in a Base Rescue role until 1995.

=== Chile ===
- Chilean Air Force - UH-1D and UH-1H

=== Colombia ===
- Colombian Aerospace Force
- Colombian Army
- Colombian Police

=== Costa Rica ===
- Air Vigilance Service

=== Dominican Republic ===
- Dominican Republic Air Force

=== El Salvador ===
- Salvadoran Air Force

=== Eswatini ===
- Umbutfo Eswatini Defence Force

=== Ethiopia ===
- Ethiopian Ground Forces - 8 UH-1H

=== Georgia ===
- Georgian Air Force

=== Greece ===
- Hellenic Air Force
- Hellenic Army

=== Guatemala ===
- Guatemalan Air Force

=== Honduras ===
- Honduran Air Force

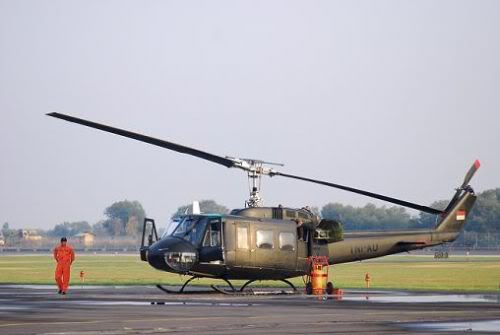
Indonesian Army Aviation Bell 205

=== Indonesia ===
- Indonesian Army - Bell 205A-1

=== Iraq ===
- Iraqi Army Aviation Command

=== Italy ===
- Italian Army
- Italian Air Force operated 48 aircraft

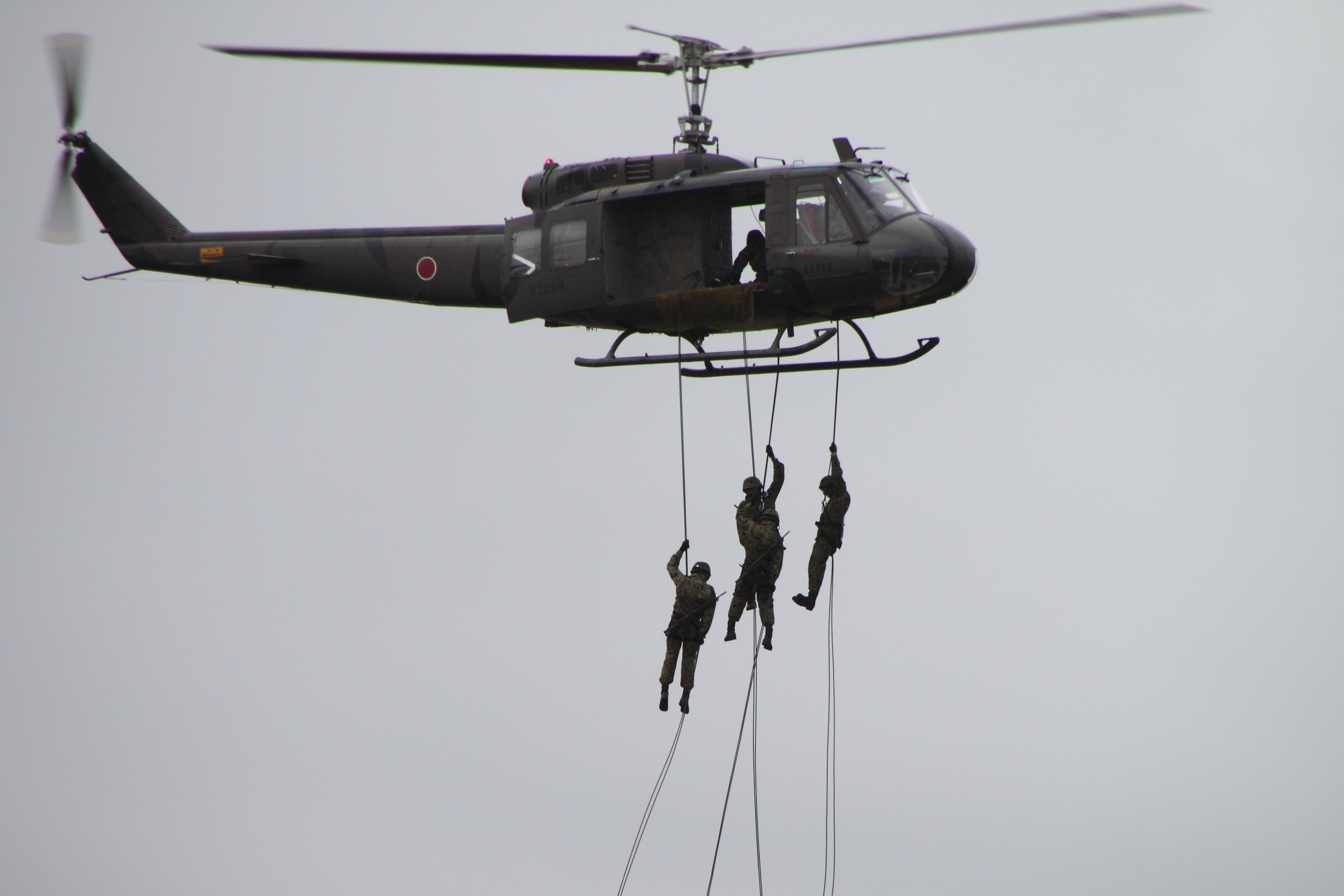
A Japanese UH-1H used by the JGSDF during a public exhibition of soldiers fast roping.

=== Japan ===
- Japan Ground Self-Defense Force - UH-1H and UH-1J

=== Kenya ===
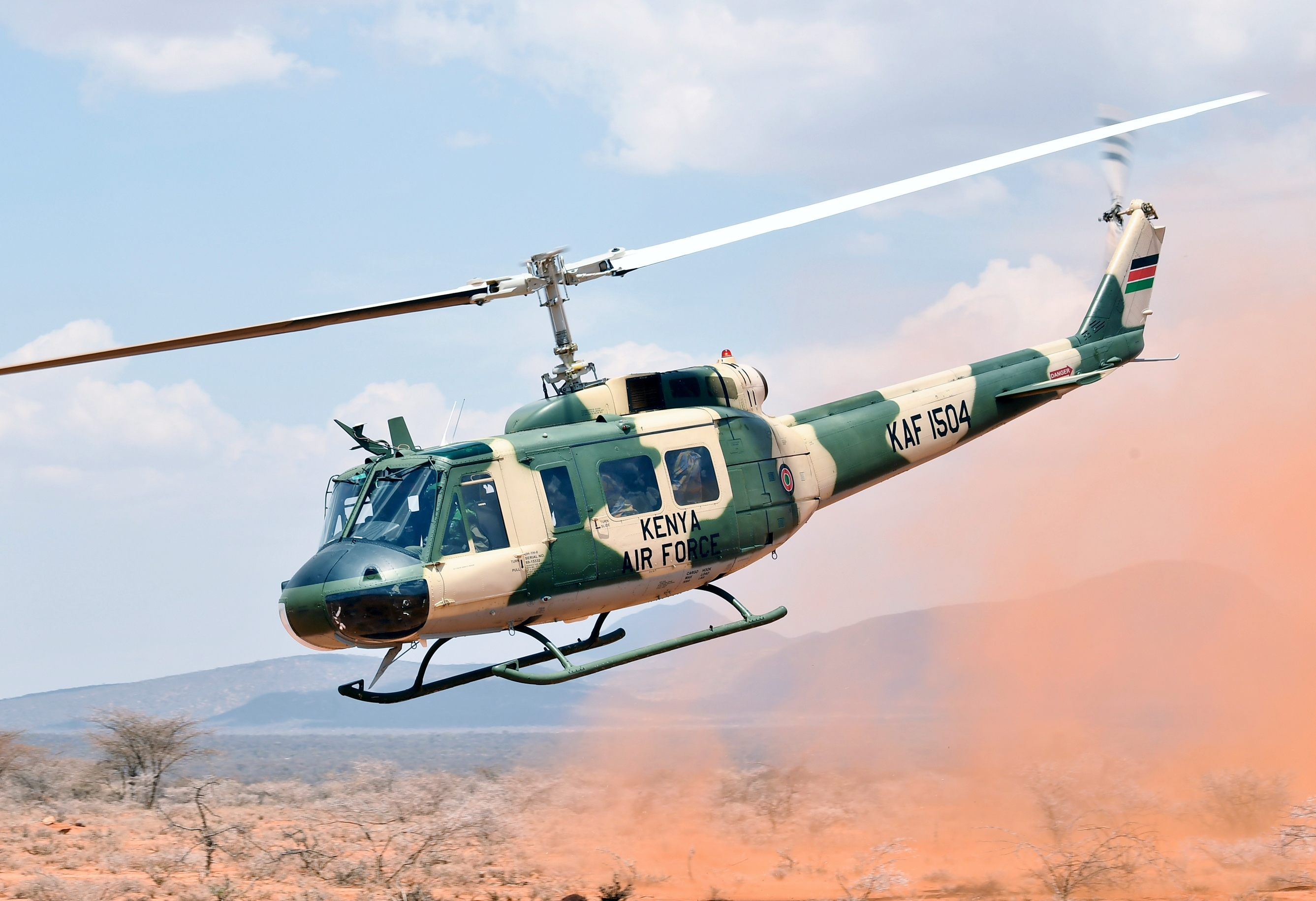
A Kenyan UH-1H huey

- Kenya Air Force – 8

=== Kazakhstan ===
- Kazakh Air Defence Forces

=== Laos ===
- Lao People's Liberation Army Air Force – 4 UH-1H

=== Lebanon ===
- Lebanese Air Force

=== Morocco ===
- Royal Moroccan Air Force

=== Myanmar ===
- Tatmadaw Donated by the US Government for Anti-Narcotics operations.

=== Nigeria ===
- Nigerian Army

=== North Macedonia ===
- Army of North Macedonia

=== Oman ===
- Royal Air Force of Oman

=== Pakistan ===
- Pakistan Air Force
- Pakistan Army Six gifted by the US in 1974.

=== Panama ===
- National Aeronaval Service

=== Paraguay ===
- Paraguayan Air Force

=== Philippines ===
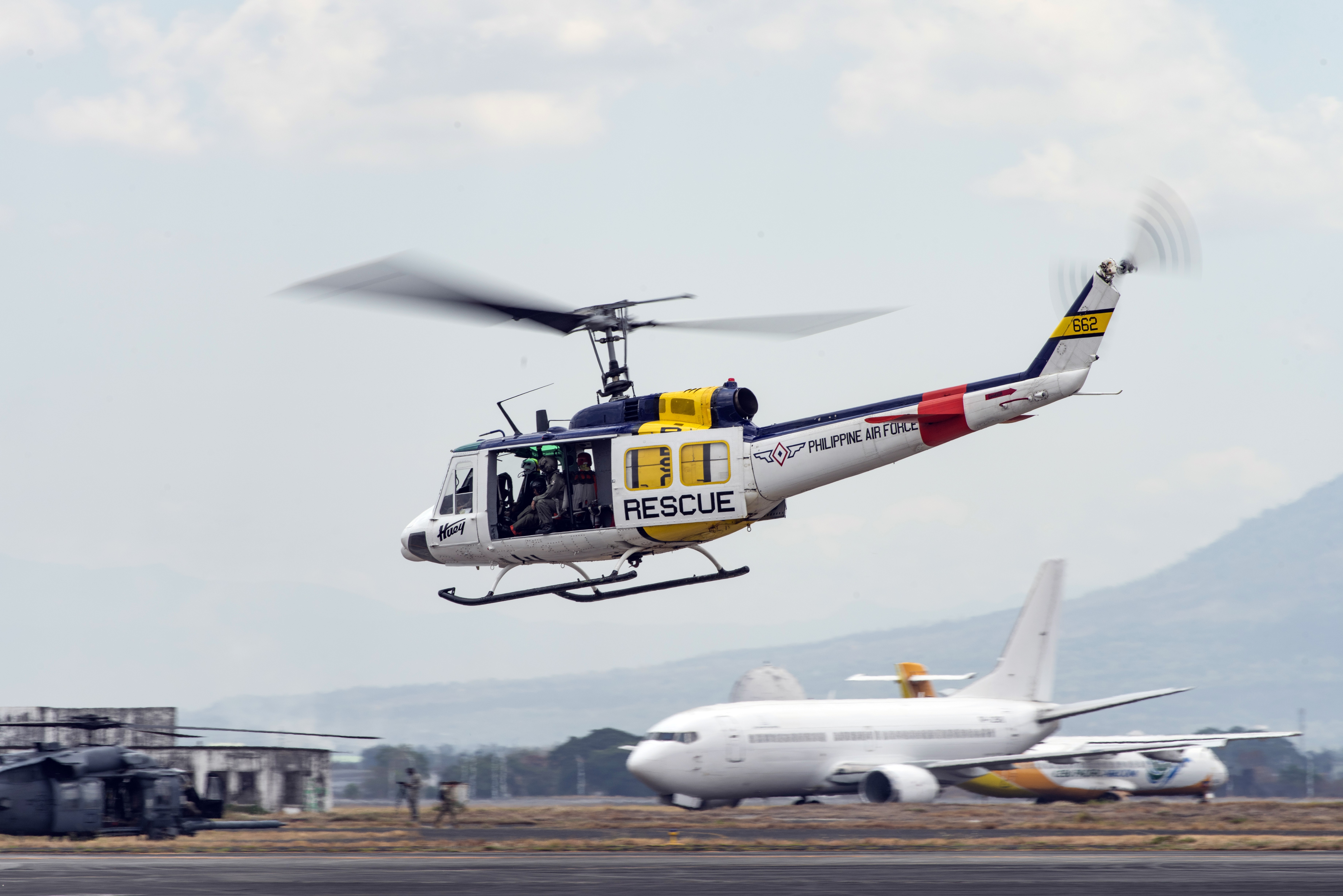
A Philippine Air Force (UH-1) Huey assigned to Search and Rescue (SAR) missions at the Balikatan 2019

- Philippine Air Force

=== Saudi Arabia ===
- Saudi Air Force

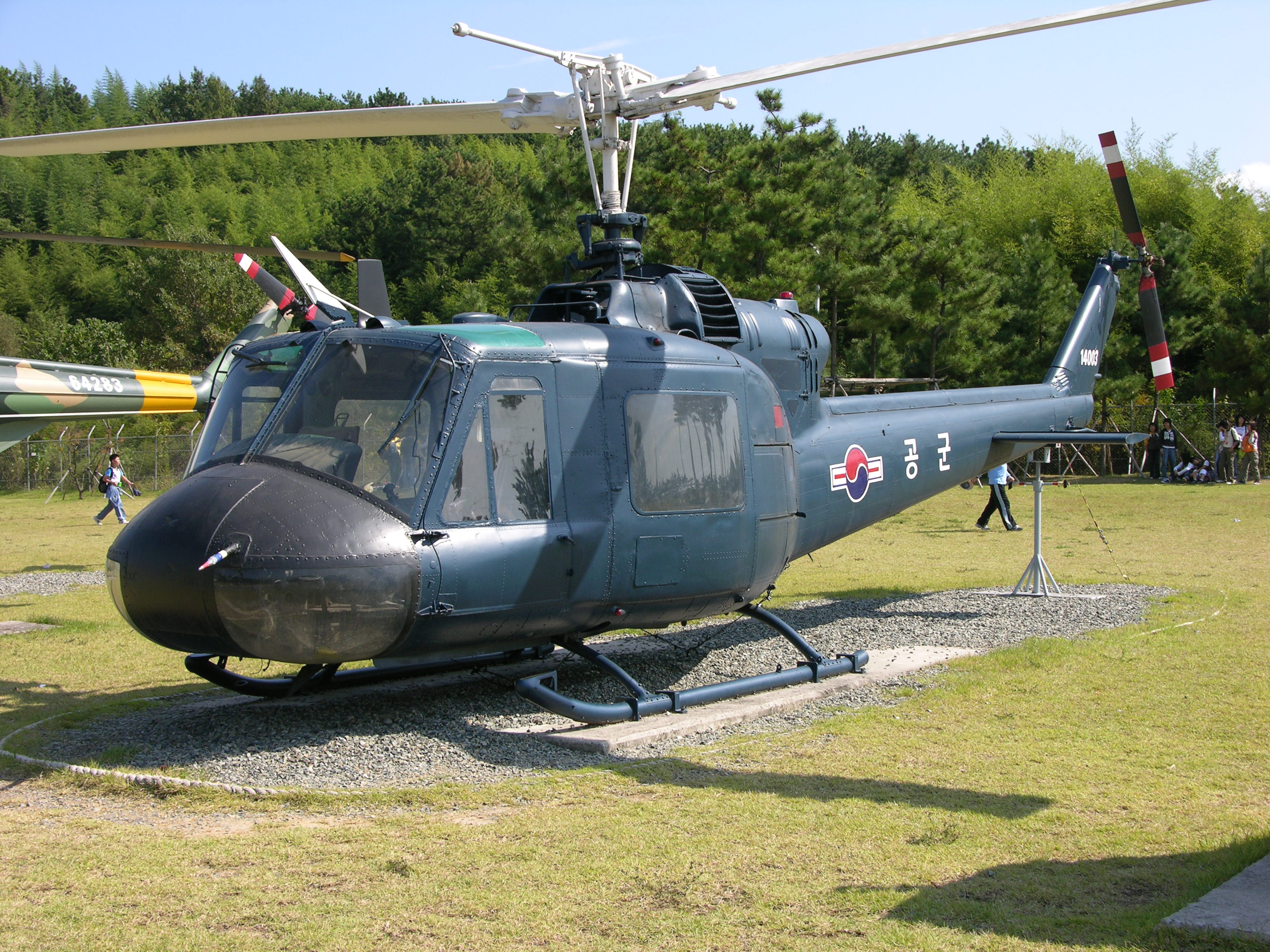
A Korean Army UH-1B

=== Somalia ===
- Somali Air Force

=== Turkey ===
- Turkish Air Force
- Turkish Army

=== Uganda ===
- Uganda Air Force - 5

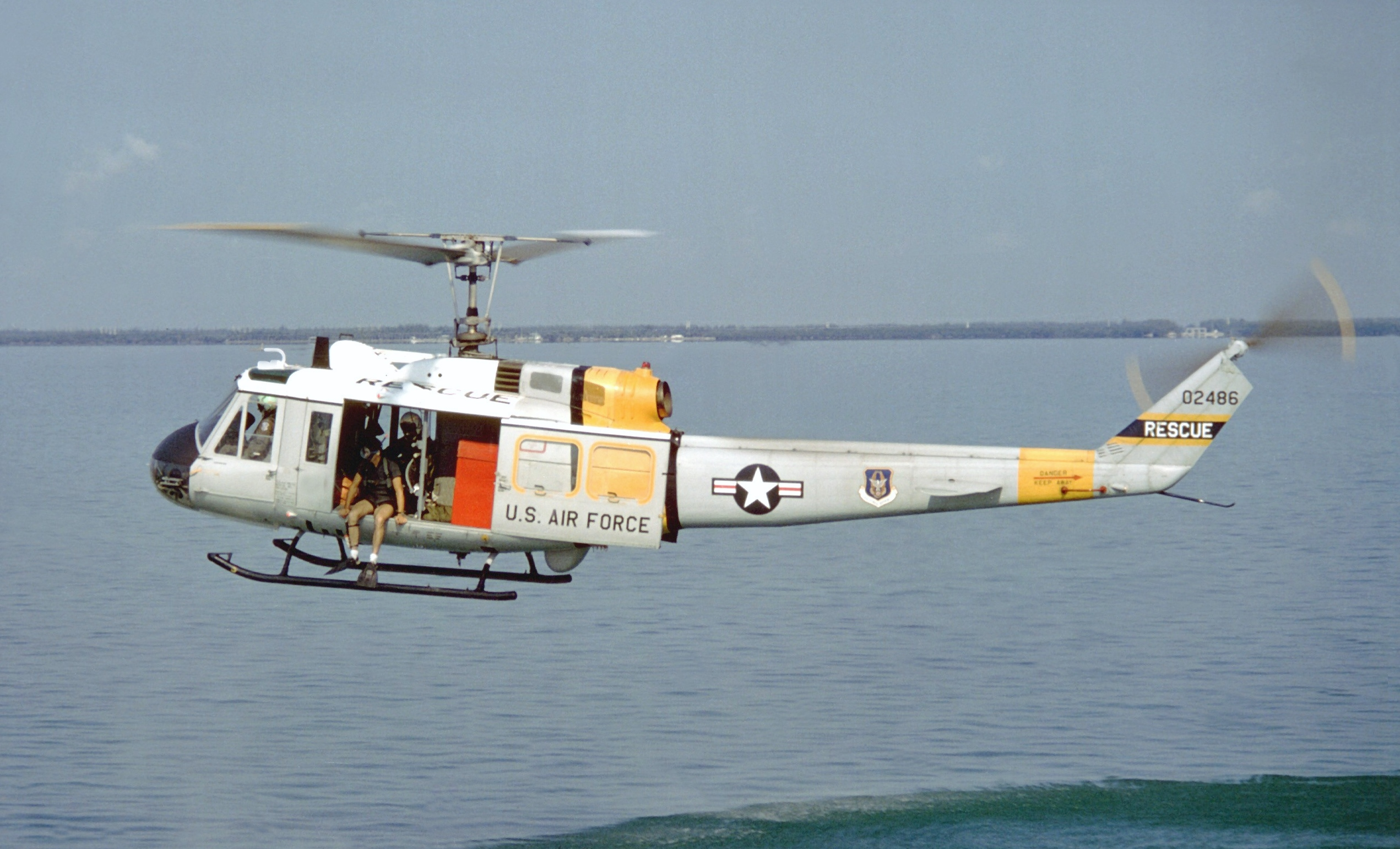
A USAF HH-1H Huey hovers over the water during search and rescue training mission. (1983)

=== Uruguay ===
- Uruguayan Air Force

=== Venezuela ===
- Venezuelan Air Force

=== Yemen ===
- Yemeni Air Force

=== Zambia ===
- Zambian Air Force

== Former operators ==
=== Argentina ===
- Argentine Air Force
- Argentine Navy

=== Australia ===
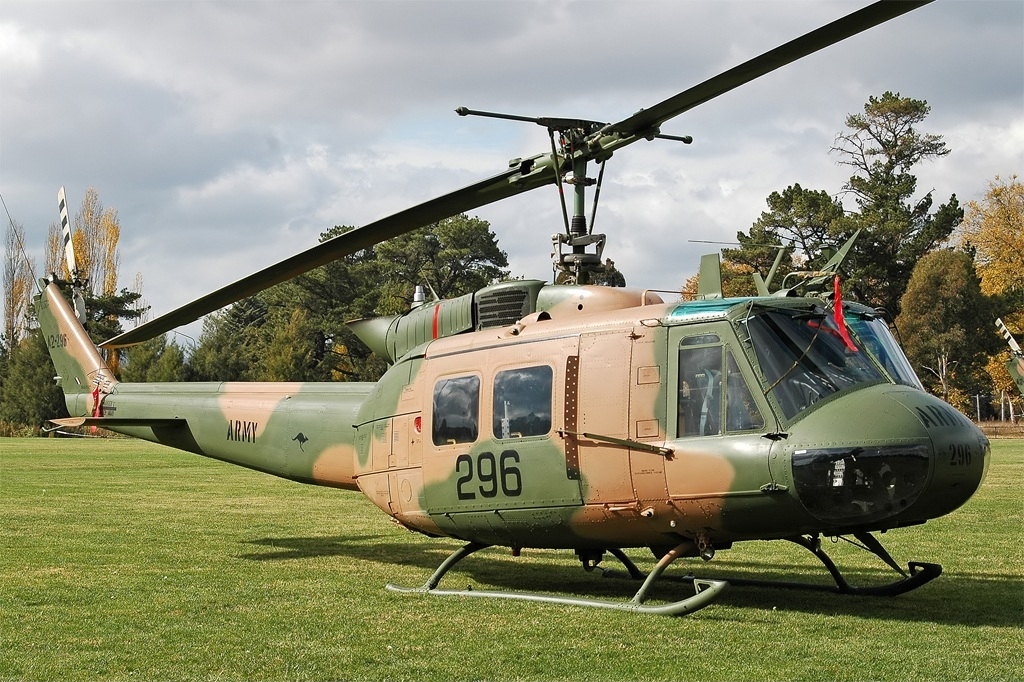
An Australian Army UH-1 in 2005

- Australian Army
  - 1st Aviation Regiment
  - 5th Aviation Regiment
  - 171st Aviation Squadron
  - Australian Defence Force Helicopter School
  - School of Army Aviation
- Royal Australian Air Force
  - No. 5 Squadron RAAF
  - No. 9 Squadron RAAF
  - No. 35 Squadron RAAF
  - Aircraft Research and Development Unit
  - School of Radio
- Royal Australian Navy
  - 723 Squadron RAN

=== Austria ===
- Austrian Air Force

=== Cambodia ===
- Khmer Air Force

=== Canada ===
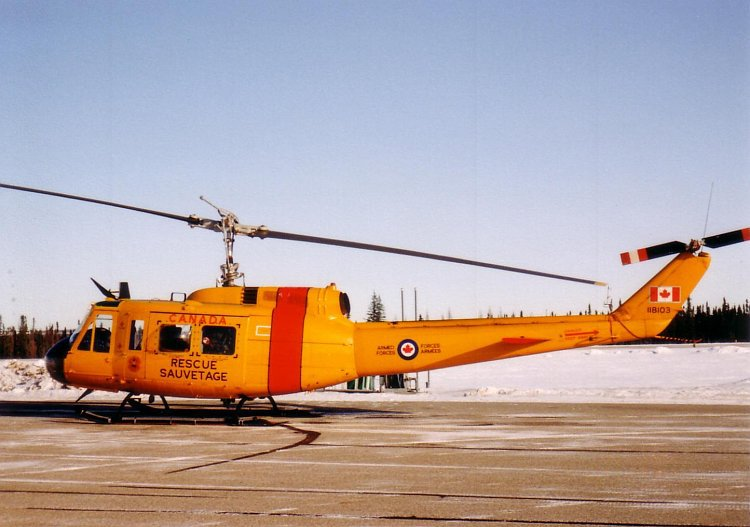
Canadian Forces Base Flight Cold Lake CH-118 Iroquois helicopter at CFB Cold Lake, January 1992

- Canadian Forces

- 417 Combat Support Squadron
- 439 Combat Support Squadron
- Base Flight Cold Lake
- Base Flight Bagotville
- Base Rescue Chatham
- Base Rescue Moose Jaw

=== Ethiopia ===
- Ethiopian Navy

=== Germany ===
- German Army Aviation Corps
- German Air Force
- Bundesgrenzschutz(Now the Bundespolizei)

=== Indonesia ===
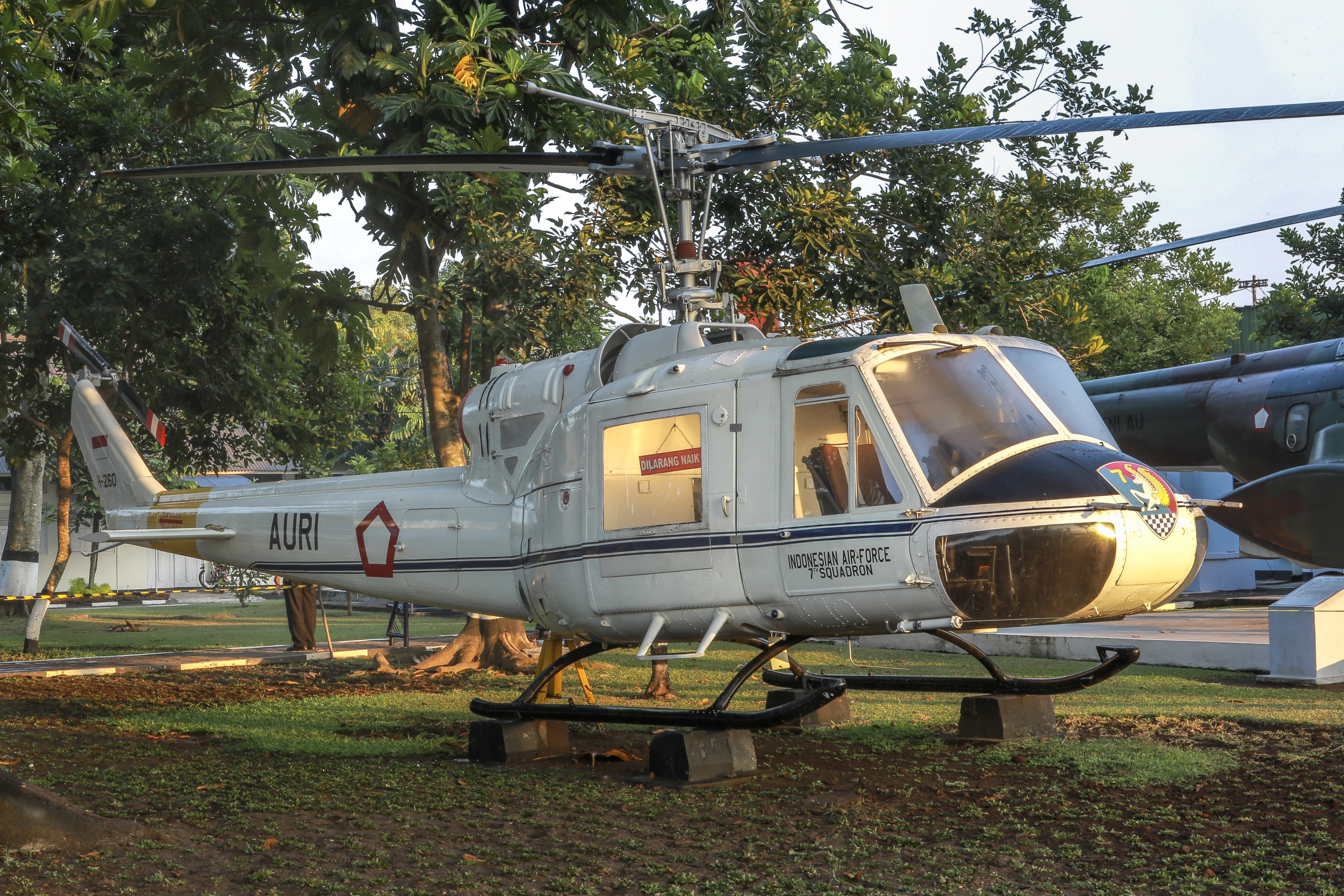
Indonesian Bell 204B at Dirgantara Mandala Museum

- Indonesian Air Force - Bell 204B

=== Israel ===
- Israeli Air Force

=== Italy ===
- Italian Air Force

=== Jamaica ===
- Jamaica Defence Force

=== Jordan ===
- Royal Jordanian Air Force

=== Netherlands ===
- Royal Netherlands Navy

=== New Zealand ===
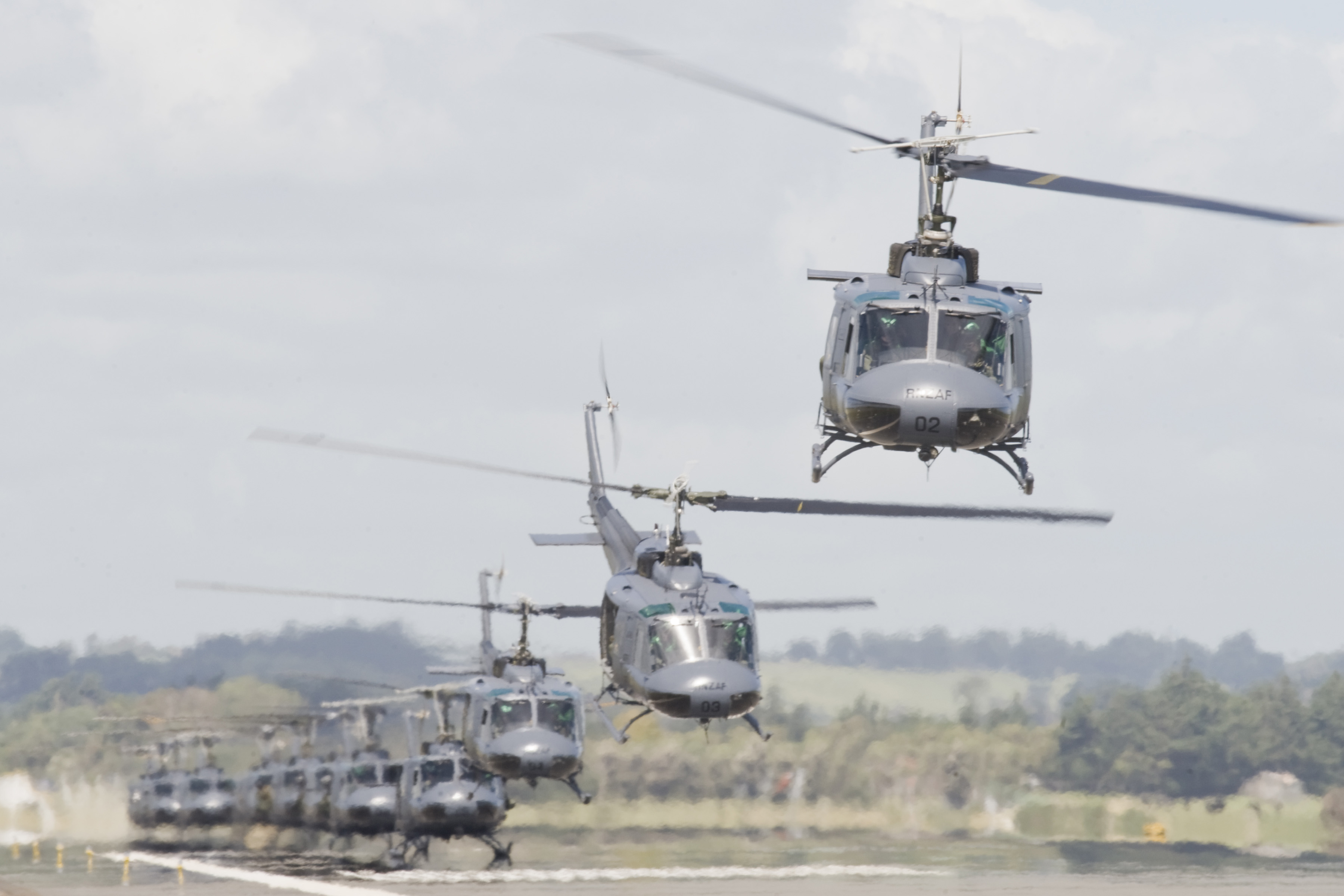
Royal New Zealand Air Force UH-1s in 2008

- Royal New Zealand Air Force
  - No. 3 Squadron RNZAF
  - No. 41 Squadron RNZAF
  - No. 141 Flight RNZAF

=== North Yemen ===
- Yemen Arab Republic Air Force

=== Norway ===
- Royal Norwegian Air Force

=== Papua New Guinea ===
- Air Operations Element

=== Peru ===
- Peruvian Air Force: 11 UH-1D delivered in 1965 plus one UH-1H later delivered. At least one UH-1D converted to UH-1H standard.

=== Rhodesia ===
- Rhodesian Air Force
  - No. 8 Squadron

=== Singapore ===
- Republic of Singapore Air Force

- 120 SQN

=== Kingdom of Laos ===
- Royal Lao Air Force

=== South Korea ===
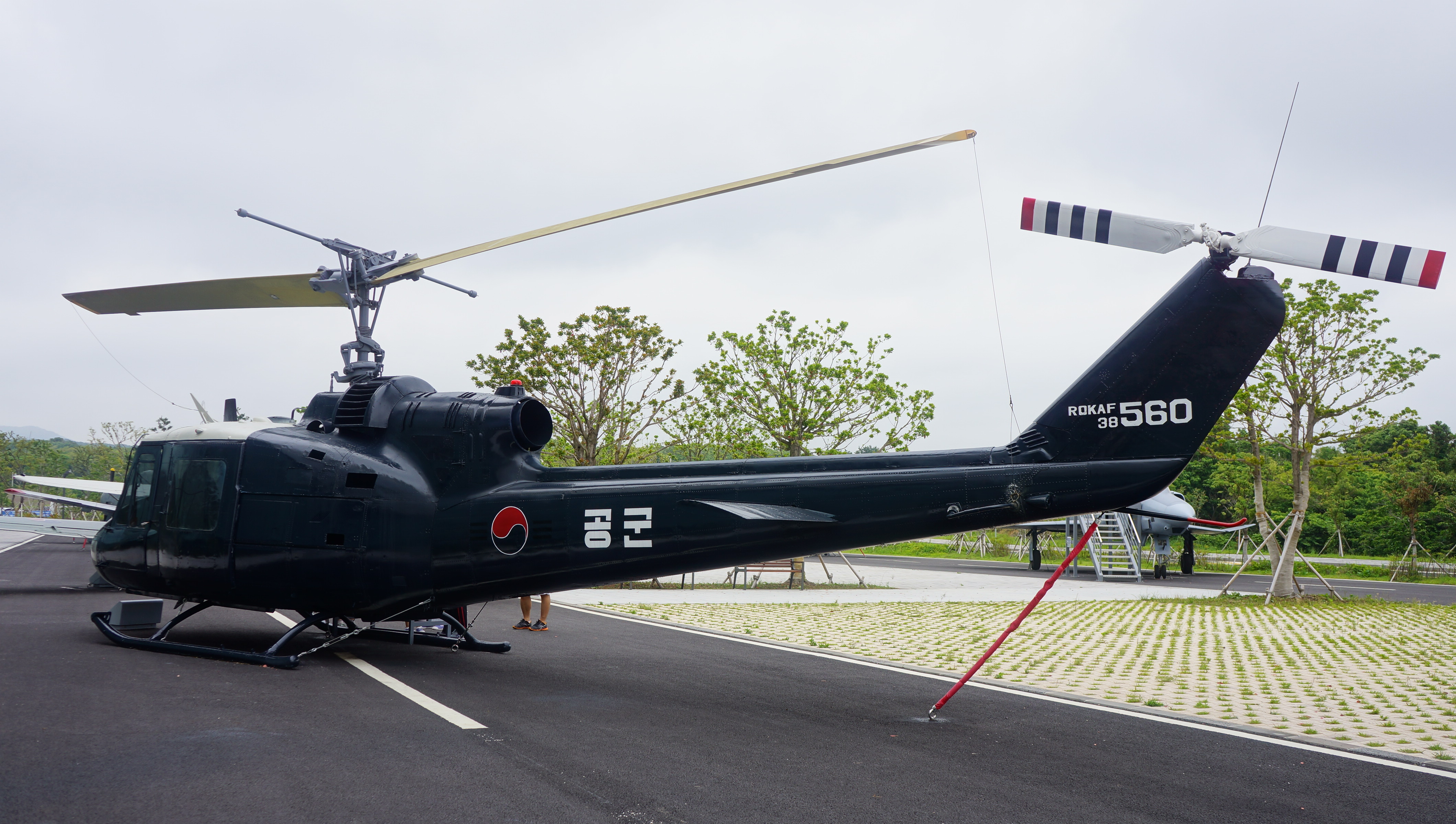
ROKAF UH-1B at Jeju Aerospace Museum

- South Korean Army
- Republic of Korea Navy
- Republic of Korea Air Force

=== South Vietnam ===
- Republic of Vietnam Air Force

=== Spain ===
- Spanish Air Force
- Spanish Army Airmobile Force

=== Suriname ===
- Suriname Air Force

=== Sweden ===
Designation helikopter (hkp) 3. Models: A (original engine), B (better engine), C (bigger rotor).

- Swedish Army
- Swedish Air Force

=== Republic of China (Taiwan) ===
- Republic of China Army
- Republic of China Air Force
- National Airborne Service Corps

=== Thailand ===
- Royal Thai Army
- Royal Thai Air Force

=== Uganda ===
- Ugandan Defense Force

=== United Kingdom ===
- Army Air Corps
  - No. 656 Squadron AAC - Captured Argentine UH-1 used in the Falklands

=== United States ===
- United States Army
- United States Marine Corps
- United States Navy
- United States Customs and Border Protection
- NASA United States Air Forse

=== Vietnam ===
- Vietnam People's Air Force

=== Zimbabwe ===
- Air Force of Zimbabwe

== See also ==
- Bell UH-1N Twin Huey
- Bell UH-1Y Venom
- Bell 212
- Bell 214

== Bibliography ==
- Gunston, Bill, An Illustrated Guide to Military Helicopters, Salamander Books, London 1981. ISBN 978-0-86101110-0.
