= IZ =

IZ, Iz, or iZ may refer to:

- Arkia (IATA code: IZ), an Israeli airline
- Immobilien Zeitung, a weekly specialist journal for the German real estate industry
- Inclusionary zoning, an American term which refers to municipal and county planning ordinances
- International zone, a type of extraterritoriality governed by international law
- Invader Zim, an American animated television series
- Iraq (NATO country code: IZ), a country in Western Asia
- IZ (YouTuber), a Mongolian YouTuber
- Israel Kamakawiwoʻole (also called "Bruddah Iz"; 1959–1997), Hawaiian musician, entertainer and Hawaiian sovereignty activist
- Islamska Zajednica u Bosni i Hercegovini, the Islamic Community of Bosnia and Herzegovina
- IZ (band), a Korean rock band
- Iž, an island in the Zadar Archipelago
- iZ (toy), an electronic musical toy released in September 2005 from Zizzle
- IZ the Wiz (1958–2009), one of the most prominent graffiti writers of the New York graffiti movement
- The Trace (film) (Turkish: Iz), a 1994 Turkish thriller film

== See also ==
- 1Z (disambiguation)
