= Gantogtokh =

Bayarsaikhan is a Mongolian surname. Notable people with the surname include:

- Bayanmönkhiin Gantogtokh (born 1972), Mongolian wrestler
- Gantogtokh Gantuya (born 1998), Mongolian footballer
- Ireedui Gantogtokh (born 1995), Mongolian entrepreneur, social activist and YouTuber
- Khandsuren Gantogtokh (born 1997), Mongolian volleyball player
- Tuguldur Gantogtokh (born 2005), Mongolian footballer
