= AGM-179 JAGM =

American air-to-surface missile

AGM-179 Joint Air-to-Ground Missile
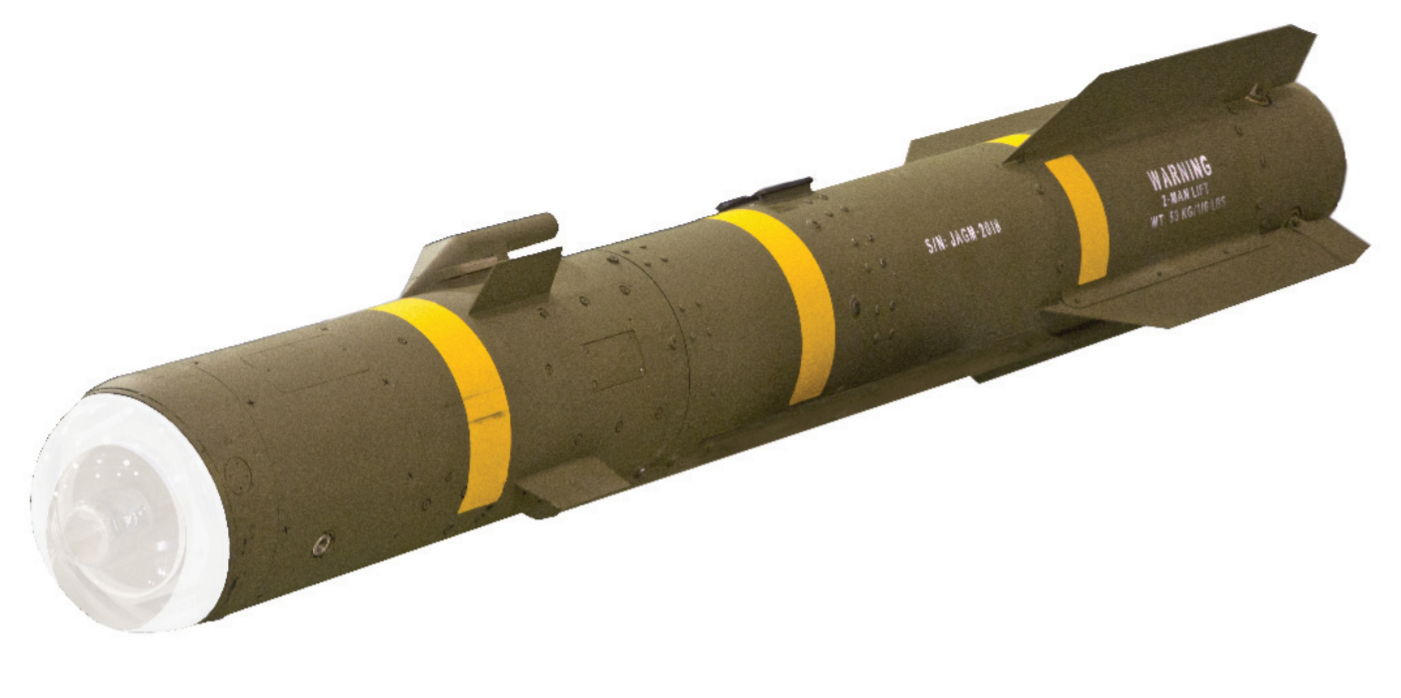
- A prototype AGM-179 JAGM
- Type: Air-to-surface missile

Service history
- In service: Achieved IOC March 1st 2022 with the U.S. Marine Corps

Production history
- Manufacturer: Lockheed Martin
- Unit cost: US$319,000 (FY 2023)
- No. built: 26,319 (planned)

Specifications
- Mass: 108 lb (49 kg)
- Length: 70 in (1,778 mm)
- Diameter: 7 in (178 mm)
- Operational range: 5 mi (8.0 km)
- Guidance system: Semi-active laser and millimeter-wave radar
- Launch platform: Helicopters and fixed-wing aircraft

The AGM-179 Joint Air-to-Ground Missile (JAGM) is an American military program to develop an air-to-surface missile, to replace the current air-launched BGM-71 TOW, AGM-114 Hellfire, and AGM-65 Maverick missiles. The U.S. Army, Navy, and Marine Corps collectively plan to buy tens of thousands of JAGMs. Despite the name of the missile, it is planned to also be launched from ground launchers and boats.

== Description ==
The Joint Air-to-Ground Missile (JAGM) program is a follow-on from the unsuccessful AGM-169 Joint Common Missile program, that was cancelled due to budget cuts. JAGM will share essentially the same objectives and technologies as the JCM, but will be developed over a longer time scale.

The JAGM has the same form factor as the Hellfire missile which it replaces and is produced on the same production line. The primary increase in capability over the Hellfire is the dual-mode seeker which incorporates both laser designation and millimeter wave radar for target acquisition; the Hellfire missile had these seekers in separate missile variants.

The Department of Defense plans to purchase 26,319 Joint Air-to-Ground Missiles in total, with the production line currently sized to build 1200 per year. More than 10% of the total planned buy had been procured during the Low Rate Initial Production (LRIP) phase.

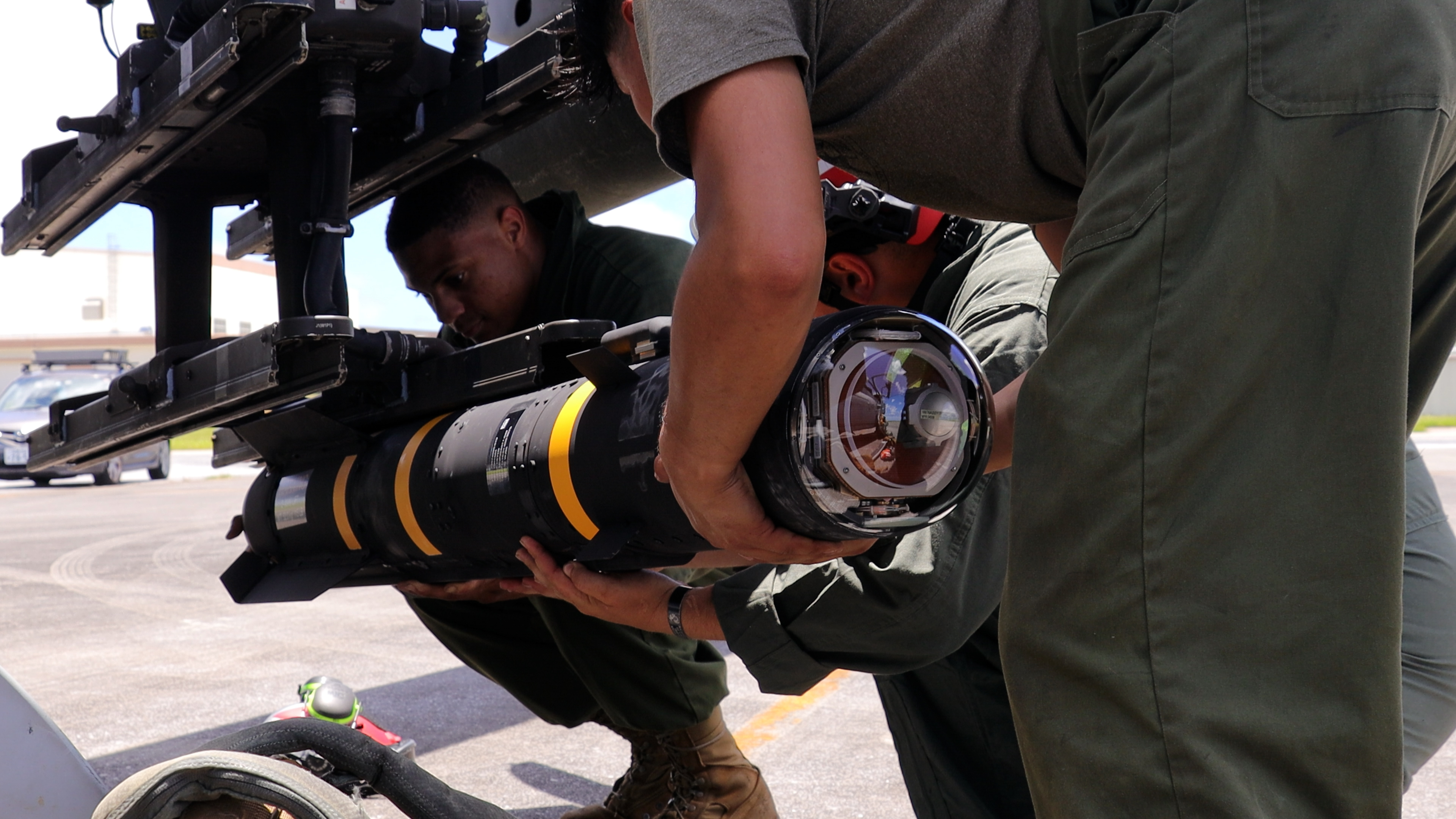
AGM-179 JAGM being loaded onto an AH-1Z

Initially an Army program, the AGM-179 is positioned well for a contract from the Navy. As of January 2025, the Freedom class Littoral combat ship is being equipped with vertical launch modules armed with 24 AGM-114 Hellfire missiles, with at least one ship having reached initial operating capability. Lockheed Martin's self-funded upgrade to the JAGM, the JAGM-Medium Range, has been designed for vertical launch from the JAGM Quad Launcher (JQL) with deployment on ships like the LCS in mind. The JAGM-ER doubles the range of the JAGM from 8 to 16 km, and also contains a third seeker mode, a Near Infrared (NIR) seeker.

Lockheed Martin has also developed the AGM-187 JAGM-F, a variant of the JAGM for use by fixed wing aircraft. Tests have been carried out on the F-15 Eagle and the F/A-18 Super Hornet.

== History ==
In June 2007, the US Department of Defense released a draft request for proposals (RFP), launching a competition for the Joint Air to Ground Missile (JAGM) program. In 2008, Raytheon and Boeing teamed up on a $125 million contract, and Lockheed Martin received a $122 million technology development contract for the Joint Air-to-Ground Missile (JAGM) system. The 27-month contracts from the U.S. Army's Aviation and Missile Command is for a competitive risk-reduction phase.

In the spring of 2011, each team submitted its proposal, with a contract award expected in the first quarter of 2012. However, in September 2011, the Army and Navy requested the JAGM program be terminated. In 2012, the JAGM survived a budget reduction, with reduced funding.

In 2012, Lockheed Martin and Raytheon received contracts from the U.S. Army to extend the JAGM technology development program, including the design, test, and demonstration phases for the JAGM guidance section. In 2013, the Army announced it would not award Raytheon a contract for the remainder of the Technology Development (TD) phase, and will continue with Lockheed's contract. In February 2012, the Navy and Marine Corps terminated their investment in the program, saying it was a "manageable risk" to do so and that they would instead focus on the GBU-53/B StormBreaker and continued Hellfire procurement, making the JAGM an Army-only program. In March 2014, they re-entered the program, with documents showing integration of the missile onto Marine AH-1Z helicopters.

Test of the AGM-179 JAGM

In 2015, the Army issued an RFP for a JAGM guidance section upgrade. Lockheed Martin offered its dual-mode laser and millimeter wave radar seeker, and Raytheon may submit its tri-mode seeker which adds imaging infrared if it chooses to compete. Lockheed Martin was awarded a $66 million engineering and manufacturing contract to combine its laser and millimeter wave seekers into the Hellfire Romeo missile body. Raytheon chose not to compete, but retains its tri-mode seeker should the Army request it.

The designation AGM-179 was assigned to the JAGM program. In 2018, a Low-Rate Initial Production (LRIP) contract for JAGM was approved. In early 2022, the AGM-179A achieved Initial Operational Capability (IOC) with USMC AH-1Z helicopters, clearing the weapon for operational deployment.

In August 2022, the JAGM was declared ready for full-rate production. By February 2022, 1,000 missiles had been produced, manufacturing at the minimum sustainment rate, under low-rate production. Improvements to the JAGM are being developed, such as a medium-range variant with a range of 10 mi (16 km), without changing the missile's dimensions.

AGM-179 JAGM being launched by an AH-1Z Viper in June 2024

In November 2022, Lockheed Martin flight tested the JAGM-Medium Range, or JAGM-MR, which traveled 10 miles. The version incorporates a tri-mode seeker, adding an imaging sensor, which was originally a requirement for the missile but was dropped due to cost factors. It was added back in the JAGM-MR as seeker technology became more affordable. Lockheed claims the upgraded capability can be provided at a cost close to the baseline JAGM.

In June 2024, a 31st Marine Expeditionary Unit attack helicopter fired off a missile in the Pacific, striking a moving target vessel. According to the 31st Marine Expeditionary Unit, "this EXPO strike launched the first live JAGM from an AH-1Z in the Indo-Pacific region and employed a variety of munitions against a high-speed towed target."

== Launch platforms ==
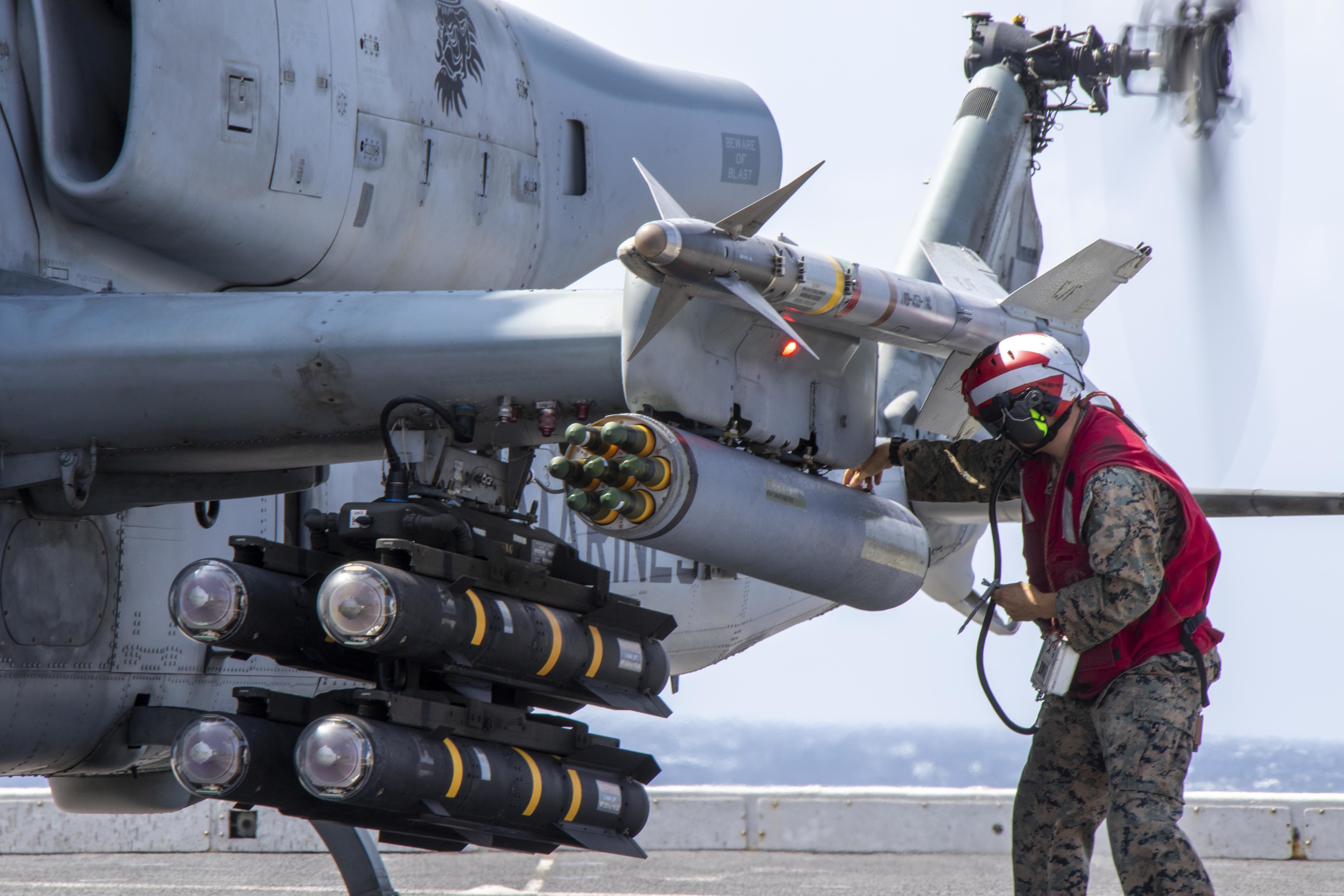
AH-1Z Viper loaded with AGM-179 JAGMs, an AIM-9 Sidewinder, and Hydra 70 rockets

- AH-64 Apache
- MQ-1C Gray Eagle
- MH-60R/S Seahawk
- MH-60 Black Hawk, Direct Action Penetrator (DAP)
- AH-1Z Viper
- OH-58F Kiowa
- AH-6 Little Bird
- MQ-9 Reaper
- Mk 41 Vertical Launching System, with Lockheed Martin Host Extensible Launching System (ExLS)

== Operators ==
Netherlands

- Selected by the Netherlands to equip its AH-64E Apache helicopters. The Netherlands requested a foreign military sale of 296 AGM-179A Joint Air-to-Ground missiles.

Poland

- Selected by Poland as part of the AH-64E Apache procurement. Poland requested 460 missiles in a foreign military sale.

United Kingdom

- Selected for use on AH-64E Apache helicopters. A proposed foreign military sale of 3,000 AGM-179A Joint Air-to-Ground Missiles for $957.4 million was approved by the United States Department of State in October 2023.

United States

- The JAGM was intended for joint service with the U.S. Army, U.S. Navy, and the U.S. Marine Corps by providing a single missile configuration for many platforms. JAGM offered the services increased operational flexibility and reduced logistics support costs.

== See also ==
- Naval Air Systems Command
- List of missiles by country
- AGM-65 Maverick – (United States)
- AGM-114 Hellfire – (United States)
- AGM-169 Joint Common Missile – (United States)
- BGM-71 TOW – (United States)
- Brimstone – (United Kingdom)
- Spike – (Israel)
- Precision Attack Air-to-Surface Missile – (United States)
