= AGM-169 Joint Common Missile =

American air-to-surface missile

AGM-169 JCM
- Type: Tactical air-to-surface missile

Production history
- Manufacturer: Lockheed Martin

Specifications
- Mass: 49 kg (108 lb)
- Length: 1.775 m (5 ft 10 in)
- Diameter: 0.178 m (7 in)
- Wingspan: 0.325 m (12 3/4 in)
- Warhead: Multi-purpose shaped charge/blast fragmentation
- Engine: Solid-fueled rocket motor
- Operational range: >28 km
- Guidance system: Semi-active laser guidance, imaging infrared and millimeter-wave active radar homing
- Launch platform: Aircraft: AH-64 Apache, F/A-18E/F, F-16, F-15E, F-35, A-10, AH-1 Cobra, and others

The AGM-169 Joint Common Missile (JCM) was a tactical air-to-surface missile program (2002–2007) developed by the Lockheed Martin corporation for the United States military aircraft, such as attack and utility helicopters, strike fighters and fighter-bombers.

== Overview ==
The missile was designed to replace the AGM-114 Hellfire and AGM-65 Maverick. Its seeker head used a combination of semi-active laser, millimeter wave, and IR guidance similar to that found on the FGM-148 Javelin anti-tank missile. This allows the missile to have a greater fire and forget capability and to operate off all current air platforms. The missile has longer range, a more potent warhead, and a "safing" system, allowing naval aircraft to return to ship without jettisoning the munitions.

This missile also shares similarities to the MBDA Brimstone missile.

== Development ==
Originally known as CMM (Common Modular Missile), the JCM (Joint Common Missile) was to be also a replacement for the BGM-71 TOW, but this requirement was later dropped. The program began in 2002 and a formal RFP (Request For Proposals) was issued to the industry in late 2003. Competitors included Boeing teamed with Northrop Grumman, Lockheed Martin and Raytheon. During late 2003 and early 2004, the competitors tested components (rocket motor, guidance, fuzing, system interface, etc.) of their JCM proposals. This included test-launches of prototype missiles. In May 2004, Lockheed Martin was declared winner of the JCM competition, and received the prime contract for a four-year SDD (System Development and Demonstration) phase. In December that year, the official designation AGM-169 was allocated to JCM.

The development of the missile was first halted in December 2004. The program was on schedule and within its budget at that time, according to Lockheed Martin. However, due to the constraints of the war in Iraq, funding was cut. In 2005 and 2006, Congress began looking into reviving the program when it was found that modernizing the Hellfire would yield higher costs and reduced capability.

The JCM has been test flown on the AH-64D in a captive test configuration.

In May 2007 the U.S. Army formally brought the program to a close and requested that Lockheed Martin cease all development work. It is expected that a follow on program, the Joint Air to Ground Missile (JAGM) will be opened to competitive tender.

== Program status ==
- December 2004 – Pentagon announces cancellation of JCM.
- March 2005 – Congressional lobbying to keep the program alive.
- September 2005 – Captive JCM test package flown on AH-64D Apache.
- January 2006 – Congress restores $30 million to keep the program in mothballs.
- September 2006 – U.S. Army includes $150 million for JCM in FY-08 budget request.
- May 2007 – The U.S. Army Aviation and Missile Life Cycle Management Command formally instructs Lockheed Martin to cease work on the program and close out the contract by June 15, 2007.

== See also ==
- AGM-114 Hellfire – (United States)
- PARS 3 LR – (Germany)
- Brimstone – (United Kingdom)
- Barq – (Pakistan)
- Precision Attack Air-to-Surface Missile – (United States)
