= AGM-114 Hellfire =

American air-to-surface missile

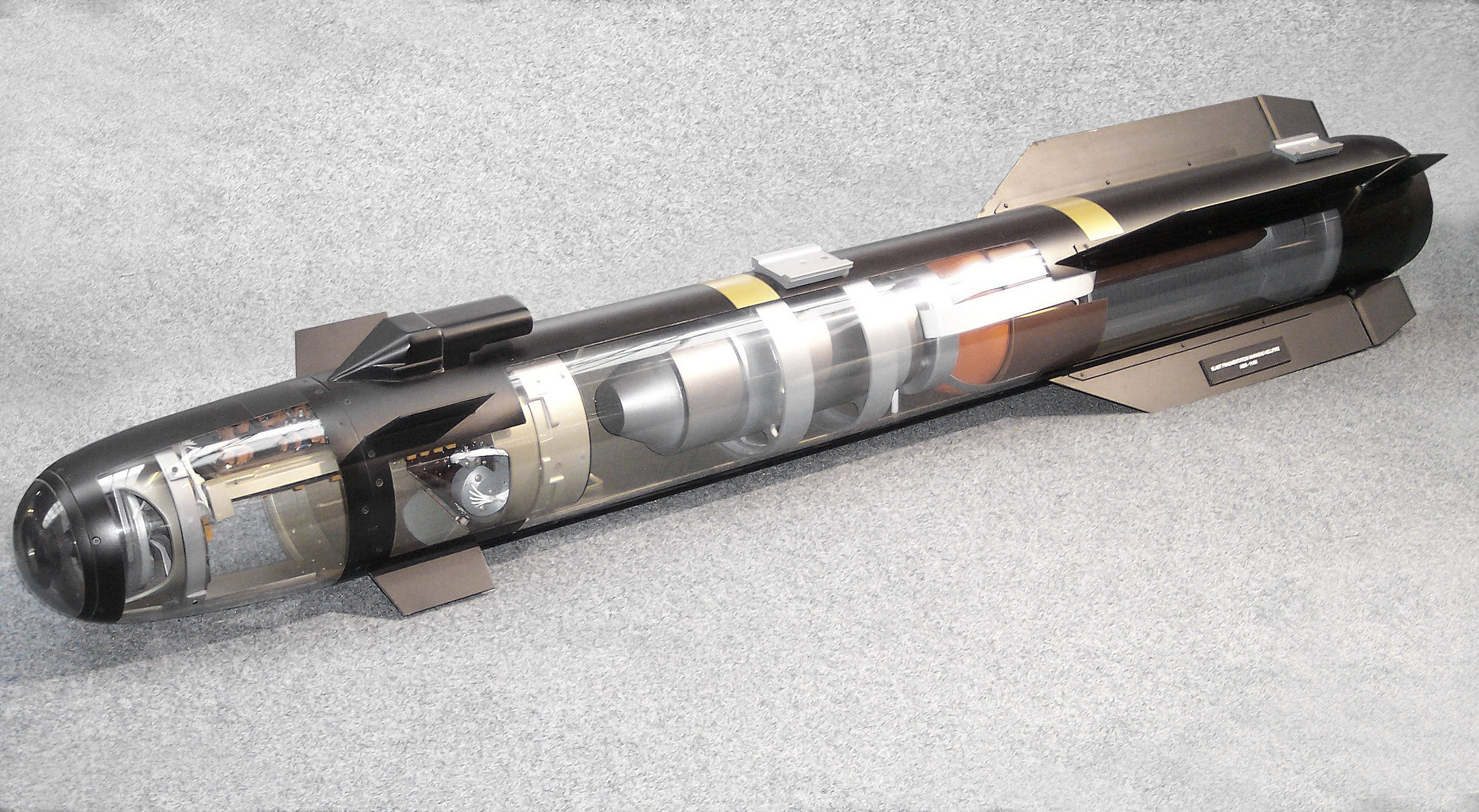
- A model of Longbow Hellfire's components
- Type: Air-to-surface/surface-to-surface missile
- Place of origin: United States

Service history
- In service: 1984–present
- Wars: Gulf War; War on terror Russian Invasion of Ukraine; 2026 Iran war

Production history
- Manufacturer: Lockheed Martin, Boeing (prior second source), and Northrop Grumman (seeker only for AGM-114L Longbow Hellfire)
- Unit cost: US$150,000 (FY 2021); US$117,000 (FY2017)
- Produced: 1974–present

Specifications
- Mass: 100–108 lb (45–49 kg)
- Length: 64 in (1.6 m)
- Diameter: 7 in (180 mm)
- Wingspan: 13 in (0.33 m)
- Warhead: High-explosive anti-tank; Shaped charge; Tandem-charge anti-armor; Metal augmented charge; Blast fragmentation
- Engine: Thiokol TX-657; Solid-fuel rocket
- Propellant: APC/HTPB
- Operational range: 550 to 12,030 yd (0.5 to 11 km)
- Maximum speed: Mach 1.3 (995 mph; 1,601 km/h)
- Guidance system: Semi-active laser homing; Millimeter-wave radar seeker
- Launch platform: Rotary and fixed-wing aircraft, unmanned combat aerial vehicles, tripods, ships, ground vehicles

The AGM-114 Hellfire is an American missile developed for anti-armor use, later developed for precision drone strikes against other target types, especially high-value targets. It was originally developed under the name "Heliborne laser, fire-and-forget missile", which led to the colloquial name "Hellfire" ultimately becoming the missile's formal name. It has a multi-mission, multi-target precision-strike ability and can be launched from multiple air, sea, and ground platforms, including the MQ-1 Predator and MQ-9 Reaper. The Hellfire missile is the primary 100-pound (45 kg) class air-to-ground precision weapon for the armed forces of the United States and many other countries. It has also been fielded on surface platforms in the surface-to-surface and surface-to-air roles.

== Description ==
Most variants are laser-guided, with one variant, the AGM-114L "Longbow Hellfire", being radar-guided. Laser guidance can be provided either from the launcher, such as the nose-mounted opto-electronics of the AH-64 Apache attack helicopter, other airborne target designators or from ground-based observers, the latter two options allowing the launcher to break line of sight with the target and seek cover.

Cockpit video showing a Hellfire missile being fired at two people in Afghanistan (at 1:42)

The development of the Hellfire Missile System began in 1974 with the United States Army requirement for a "tank-buster", launched from helicopters to defeat armored fighting vehicles.

The Hellfire II, developed in the early 1990s is a modular missile system with several variants, and entered service with the U.S. Army in 1996. Hellfire II's semi-active laser variants—AGM-114K high-explosive anti-tank (HEAT), AGM-114KII with external blast fragmentation sleeve, AGM-114M (blast fragmentation), and AGM-114N metal augmented charge (MAC)—achieve pinpoint accuracy by homing in on a reflected laser beam aimed at the target. The General Atomics MQ-1 Predator and MQ-9 Reaper unmanned combat aerial vehicles (UCAVs) carry the Hellfire II, but the most common platform is the helicopter gunship, such as the AH-64 Apache or AH-1 Cobra, which can carry up to 16 of them each. The AGM-114L, or Longbow Hellfire, is a fire-and-forget weapon: equipped with millimeter-wave (MMW) active radar homing, it requires no further guidance after launch—even being able to lock on to its target after launch—and can hit its target without the launcher or other friendly unit being in line of sight of the target. It also works in adverse weather and battlefield obscurants, such as smoke and fog, which can mask the position of a target or prevent a designating laser from forming a detectable reflection. Each Hellfire weighs 104 pounds (47 kg), including the 20-pound (9 kg) warhead, and has a range of 4.4–6.8 miles (7.1–11 km) depending on trajectory. The Hellfire has a Circular Error Probable (CEP) of less than 3 feet (0.91 m).

The AGM-114R "Romeo" Hellfire II entered service in late 2012. It uses a semi-active laser homing guidance system and a K-charge multipurpose warhead to engage targets that formerly needed multiple Hellfire variants. It will replace AGM-114K, M, N, and P variants in U.S. service.

In October 2012, the U.S. ordered 24,000 Hellfire II missiles, for both the U.S. armed forces and foreign customers.

A possible new JCM successor called the Joint Air to Ground Missile (JAGM) is under consideration. Due to budget reductions, JAGM development was separated into increments, with increment 1 focusing on adding a millimeter-wave radar to the Hellfire-R to give it a dual-mode seeker, enabling it to track moving targets in bad weather.

== Operational history ==
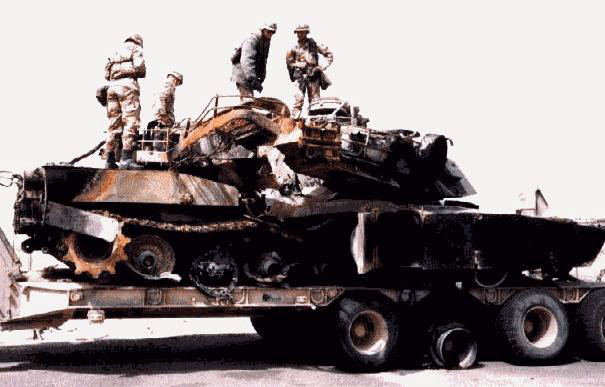
M1A1 Abrams main battle tank destroyed by friendly fire in 1991 Gulf War; one Abrams is thought to have been accidentally set on fire by a Hellfire missile fired from an Apache helicopter.

In 2009, the British Ministry of Defence (MoD) acknowledged that Army Air Corps (AAC) AgustaWestland Apaches had used AGM-114N Hellfire missiles against Taliban forces in Afghanistan. The MoD stated that 20 missiles were used in 2008 and a further 20 in 2009. In the British Parliament, Liberal Democrat politician Nick Harvey argued that the "Parliament must be reassured these are a weapon of last resort."

AGM-114 Hellfire missiles were used to kill Hamas leader Ahmed Yassin by the Israeli Air Force (IAF) in 2004, and by the US military to kill American-born Islamic cleric Anwar al-Awlaki in Yemen in 2011, Al-Qaeda operative Abu Yahya al-Libi in Pakistan in 2012, al-Shabaab militant Mukhtar Abu Zubair in Somalia in 2014, and British ISIL executioner Mohammed Emwazi (also known as "Jihadi John") in Syria in 2015. They were also used in the assassination of Qasem Soleimani as well as the killing of Ayman al-Zawahiri.

The AGM-114 has occasionally been used as an air-to-air missile. The first operational air-to-air kill with a Hellfire took place on 24 May 2001, after a civilian Cessna 152 aircraft entered Israeli airspace from Lebanon, with unknown intentions and refusing to answer or comply with ATC repeated warnings to turn back. An Israeli Air Force AH-64A Apache helicopter fired on the Cessna, resulting in its complete disintegration.

In January 2016, The Wall Street Journal reported that one training missile without a warhead was accidentally shipped to Cuba in 2014 after a training mission in Europe; it was later returned. A US official said that this was an inert "dummy" version of the Lockheed system stripped of its warhead, fuse, guidance equipment and motor, known as a "Captive Air Training Missile".

During the Russo-Ukrainian War, Ukraine used a V2X Tempest vehicle equipped with a Hellfire missile launcher to conduct counter-uncrewed aerial systems missions.

AGM-114 Hellfire missiles were used by the US in combat in the 2026 Iran war. The US Navy fired Hellfire missiles at an unladen oil tanker in the Persian Gulf as it approached the port at Kharg Island. They fired Hellfire missiles at the smokestacks, disabling the oil tanker in an effort to enforce a blockade against Iranian ports.

== Variants ==
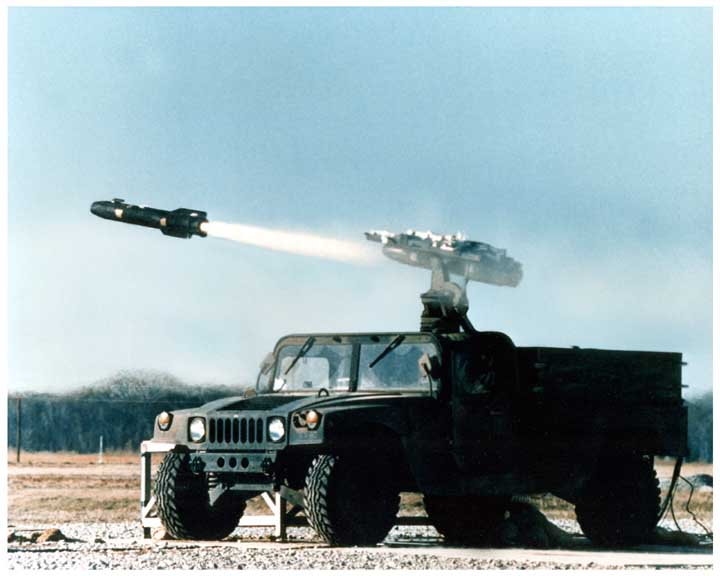
AGM-114 Ground Launched Hellfire-Light (GLH-L) missile system on a modified HMMWV chassis

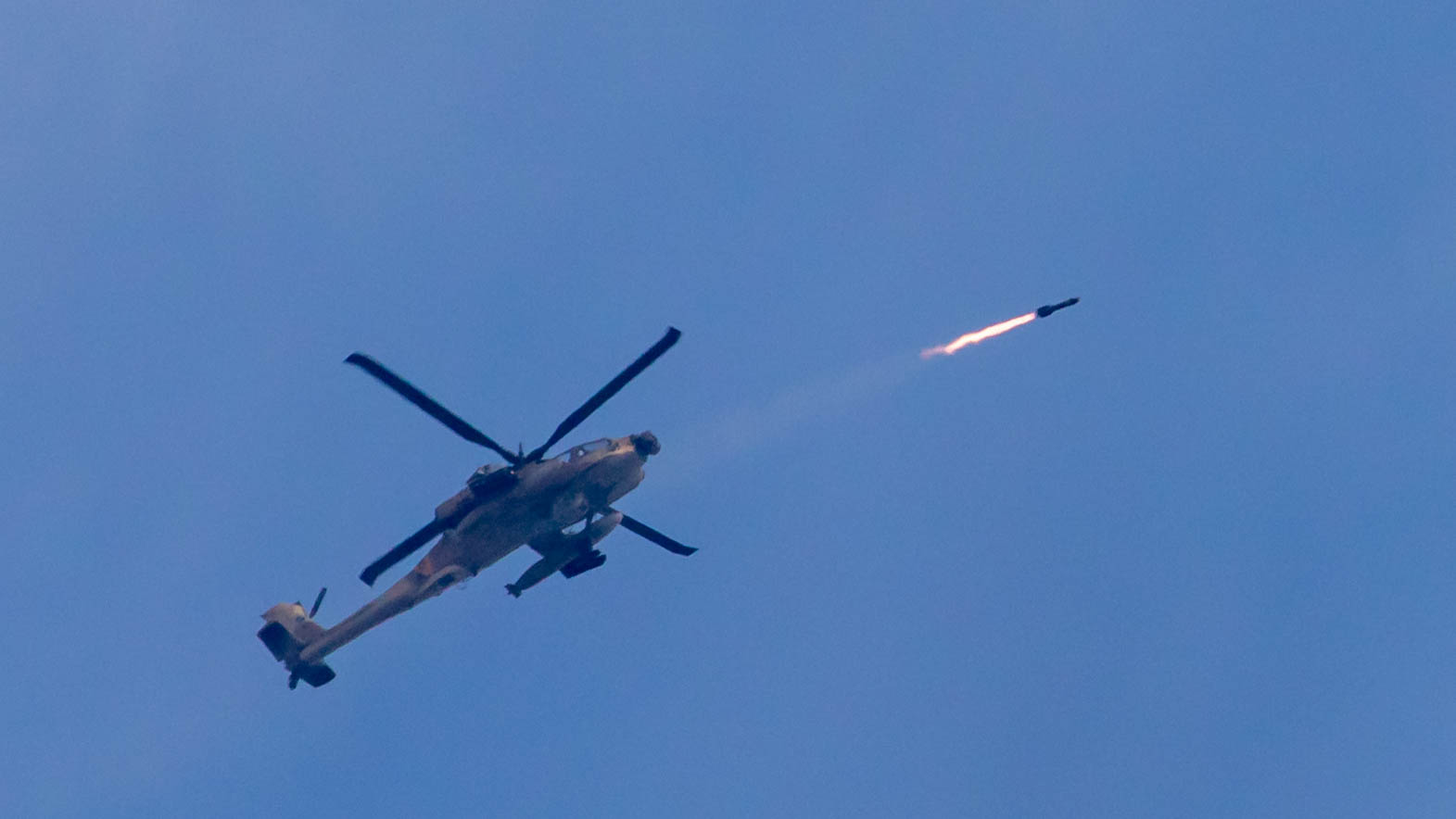
Israeli Air Force Squadron 190 AH-64A Peten Launched Hellfire missile, Gaza–Israel clashes (November 2018)

AGM-114A
- Produced: 1982–1992
- Target: Armored vehicles
- Range: 8,700 yd (8,000 m)
- Guidance:
  - Semi-active laser homing (SALH)
  - Non-programmable
  - Analog autopilot
- Warhead: 18 lb (8 kg) shaped charge HEAT. Unable to penetrate reactive armor.
- Length: 64 in (163 cm)
- Weight: 100 lb (45 kg)

AGM-114B/C
- Produced: 1982–1992
- Target: Armored vehicles, ship-borne targets
- Range: 8,700 yd (8,000 m)
- Guidance:
  - Semi-active laser homing (SALH)
  - Non-programmable
  - Analog autopilot
- Warhead: 18 lb (8 kg) shaped charge HEAT. Unable to penetrate reactive armor.
- Length: 64 in (163 cm)
- Weight: 100 lb (45 kg)

AGM-114F/FA Interim Hellfire
- Produced: 1991–1994
- Target: Armored vehicles
- Range: 8,700 yd (8,000 m)
- Guidance:
  - Semi-active laser homing (SALH)
  - Non-programmable
  - Analog autopilot
- Warhead: 18 lb (8 kg) shaped charge HEAT. Tandem-charge, can penetrate reactive armor.
- Length: 64 in (163 cm)
- Weight: 100 lb (45 kg)

AGM-114K/K2/K2A Hellfire II
- Produced: since 1993–2018
- Target: All armored targets
- Range: 12,000 yd (11,000 m)
- Guidance:
  - Semi-active laser homing with electro-optical countermeasures hardening
  - Digital autopilot & electronics improvements allow target reacquisition after lost laser lock
- Warhead: 20 lb (9 kg) tandem shaped charge HEAT
- Length: 64 in (163 cm)
- Weight: 100 lb (45 kg)
- K-2 adds insensitive munitions (IM)
- K-2A adds blast-fragmentation sleeve

AGM-114L Hellfire Longbow
- Produced: 1995–2005, 2016–
- Target: All armored targets
- Range: 8,700 yd (8,000 m)
- Guidance:
  - Fire and forget millimeter-wave (MMW) radar seeker coupled with inertial guidance
  - Homing capability in adverse weather and the presence of battlefield obscurants
  - Programmable fuzing and guidance
- Warhead: 20 lb (9 kg) tandem shaped charge high-explosive anti-tank (HEAT) insensitive munitions (IM) warhead
- Length: 71 in (180 cm)
- Weight: 108 lb (49 kg)
- L-7/8A Counter-UAS/counter-littoral variants with proximity fuze and blast-fragmentation sleeve

AGM-114M Hellfire II (Blast Frag)
- Produced: 1998–2010
- Target: Bunkers, light vehicles, urban (soft) targets and caves
- Range: 12,000 yd (11,000 m)
- Guidance:
  - Semi-active laser homing
  - Delayed and programmable fuzing in for hardened targets
- Warhead: Blast fragmentation/incendiary
- Weight: 108 lb (49 kg)
- Length: 71 in (180 cm)

AGM-114N Hellfire (MAC)

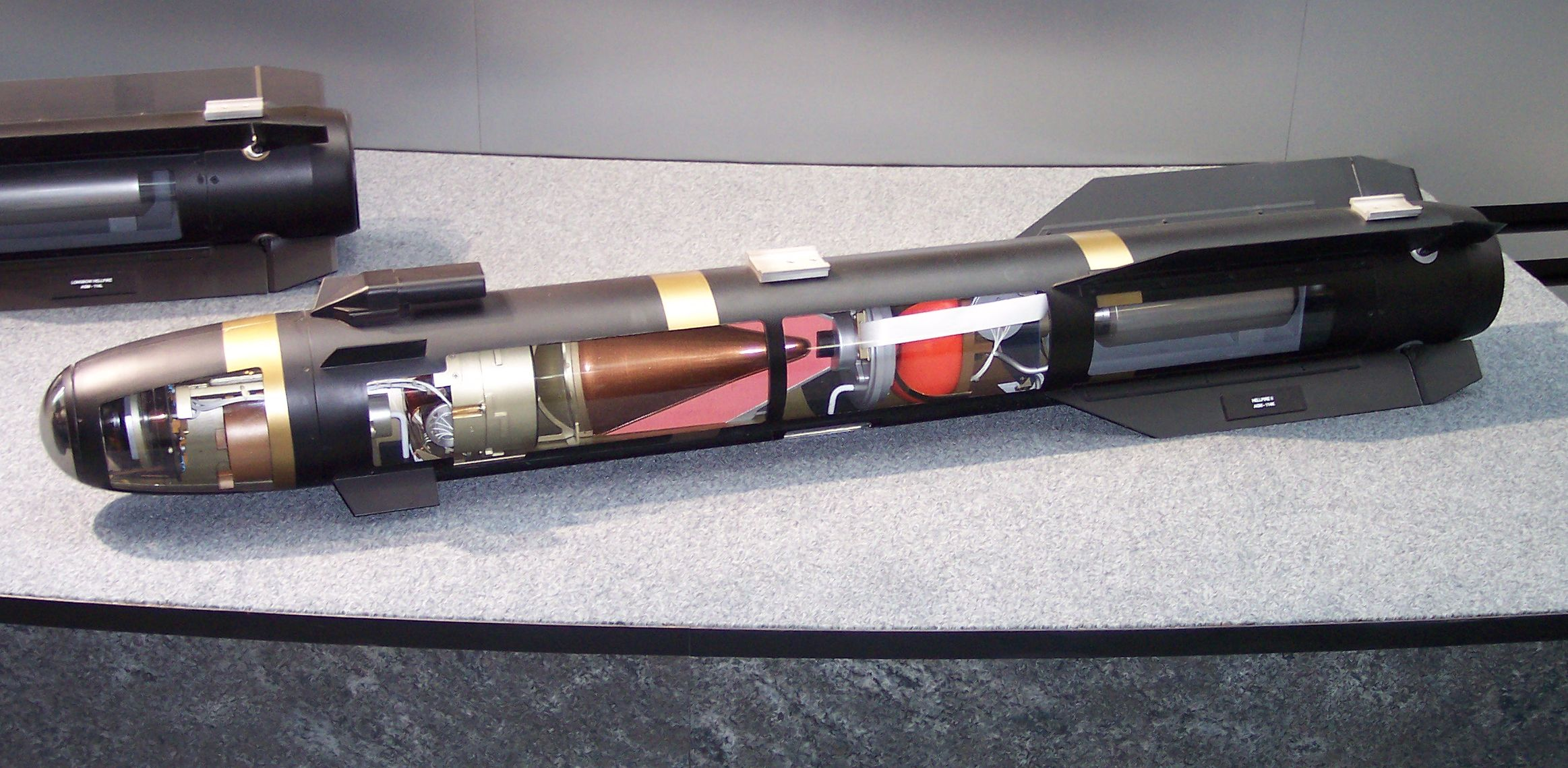
Hellfire II missile exposed through a transparent casing, showing laser homing guidance system in front, copper cone shaped charge explosive in middle, propulsion in the rear

- Produced: 2003–2018
- Target: Buildings, soft-skinned targets, ship-borne targets
- Range: 12,000 yd (11,000 m)
- Guidance:
  - Semi-active laser homing
  - Millimeter-wave radar seeker
- Warhead: Metal augmented charge (thermobaric), sustained pressure wave with delayed fuze capability
- Weight: 106 lb (48 kg)
- Speed: Mach 1.3 (1,600 km/h)
- Diameter: 7.1 in (180 mm)
- Wingspan: 13 in (0.33 m)
- Length: 5 ft 4 in (1.63 m)

AGM-114P/P+ Hellfire II (For UAS)
- Produced: 2003–2012
- Target: All surface targets
- Range: 12,000 yd (11,000 m)
- Guidance:
  - Semi-active laser homing
  - Delayed and programmable fuzing in for hardened targets
- Warhead: Shaped Charge or Blast Fragmentation
- Weight: 108 lb (49 kg)
- Length: 71 in (180 cm)
- Designed for UAV altitudes
- P-2A adds steel fragmentation sleeve
- P-2B adds tantalum fragmentation sleeve
- P+ adds enhanced inertial measurement unit (IMU) and software support, many customizations for varying battlefields.

AGM-114R Hellfire II (Hellfire Romeo)
- Produced: since 2012
- Target: All targets
- Range: 8,700 yd (8,000 m)
- Guidance:
  - Semi-active laser homing
- Warhead: Multi-function warhead, reduced net explosive weight for low collateral damage (R-9E and R-9H).
- Weight: 108 lb (49 kg)
- Speed: Mach 1.3
- Length: 71 in (180 cm)
- Unit Cost: $99,600 (all-up round, 2015 USD)

M36 Captive Flight Training Missile
The M36 is an inert device used for training in the handling of the Hellfire. It includes an operational laser seeker.

AGM-114R-9X
The Hellfire R-9X is a Hellfire variant with a kinetic warhead with pop-out blades instead of explosives, used against specific human targets. Its lethality is due to 100 lb (45 kg) of dense material with six blades flying at high speed, to crush and cut the targeted person—the R-9X has also been referred to as the "Ninja Missile" and "Flying Ginsu". It is intended to reduce collateral damage when targeting specific people. Deployed in secret in 2017, its existence has been public since 2019. This variant was used in the killing in 2017 of Abu Khayr al-Masri, a member of Al-Qaeda's leadership, and in 2019 of Jamal Ahmad Mohammad Al Badawi, accused mastermind of the 2000 USS Cole bombing. The weapon has also been used in Syria, and in Afghanistan against a Taliban commander. It was used twice in 2020 against senior al-Qaeda leaders in Syria; in September 2020 US officials estimated that it had been used in combat six times.

Hellfire missiles fired by a Reaper drone were used on 31 July 2022 to kill Ayman al-Zawahiri, the leader of Al-Qaeda, who had previously been involved in planning the 9/11 and other attacks on US targets. It was reported that the missile hit him on a balcony, causing minimal collateral damage. Reports stress that avoiding other casualties was a priority for the mission, following drone attacks that killed several innocents attracting much criticism. It is widely thought that the Hellfires were the R-9X variant, but a United States Special Operations Command spokesman declined to comment, while confirming that the R-9X was "in US Special Operations Command's munitions inventory".

Images of the aftermath of a US attack on a member of Kata'ib Hezbollah (claimed to be Abu Baqir al-Saadi by Hezbollah-affiliated reports) suggest an R-9X was used. The nature and announcement of the attack has led Howard Altman to suggest the weapon system is made more widely available to US forces. In December 2024 an R-9X appears to have been used near Idlib.

In late February 2025 the US government made video of an R-9X in action public for the first time; the missile was used by CENTCOM to kill the senior commander of Al-Qaeda affiliate Hurras al-Din in Northwest Syria.

== Launch vehicles and systems ==
=== Manned helicopters ===
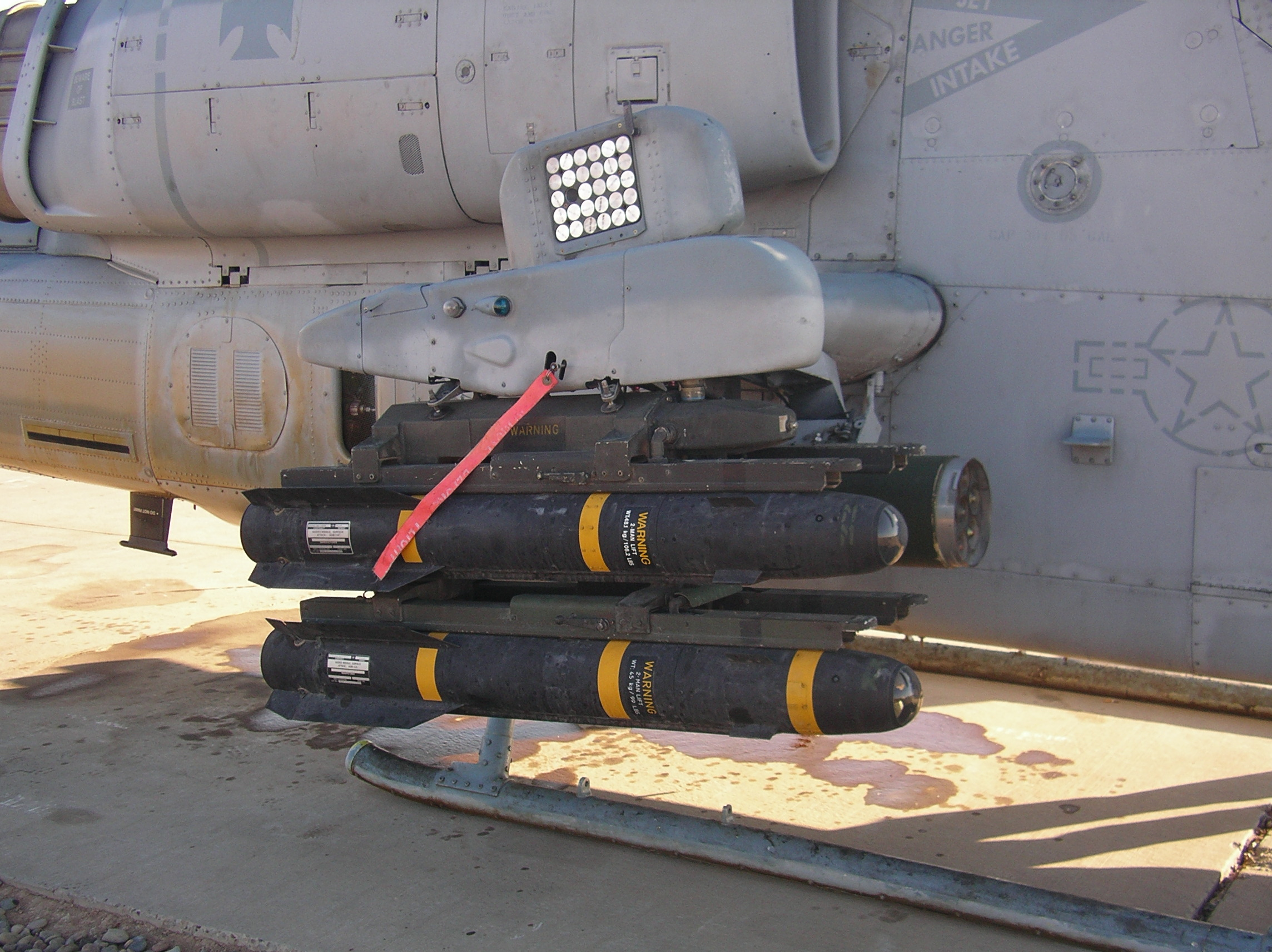
Hellfire missiles on a United States Marine Corps AH-1W Super Cobra

- AH-64 Apache
- AH-6
- MH-6 Little Bird
- AH-1Z Viper
- Bell OH-58 Kiowa
- Tiger ARH
- MH-60R
- MH-60S

=== Fixed-wing aircraft ===
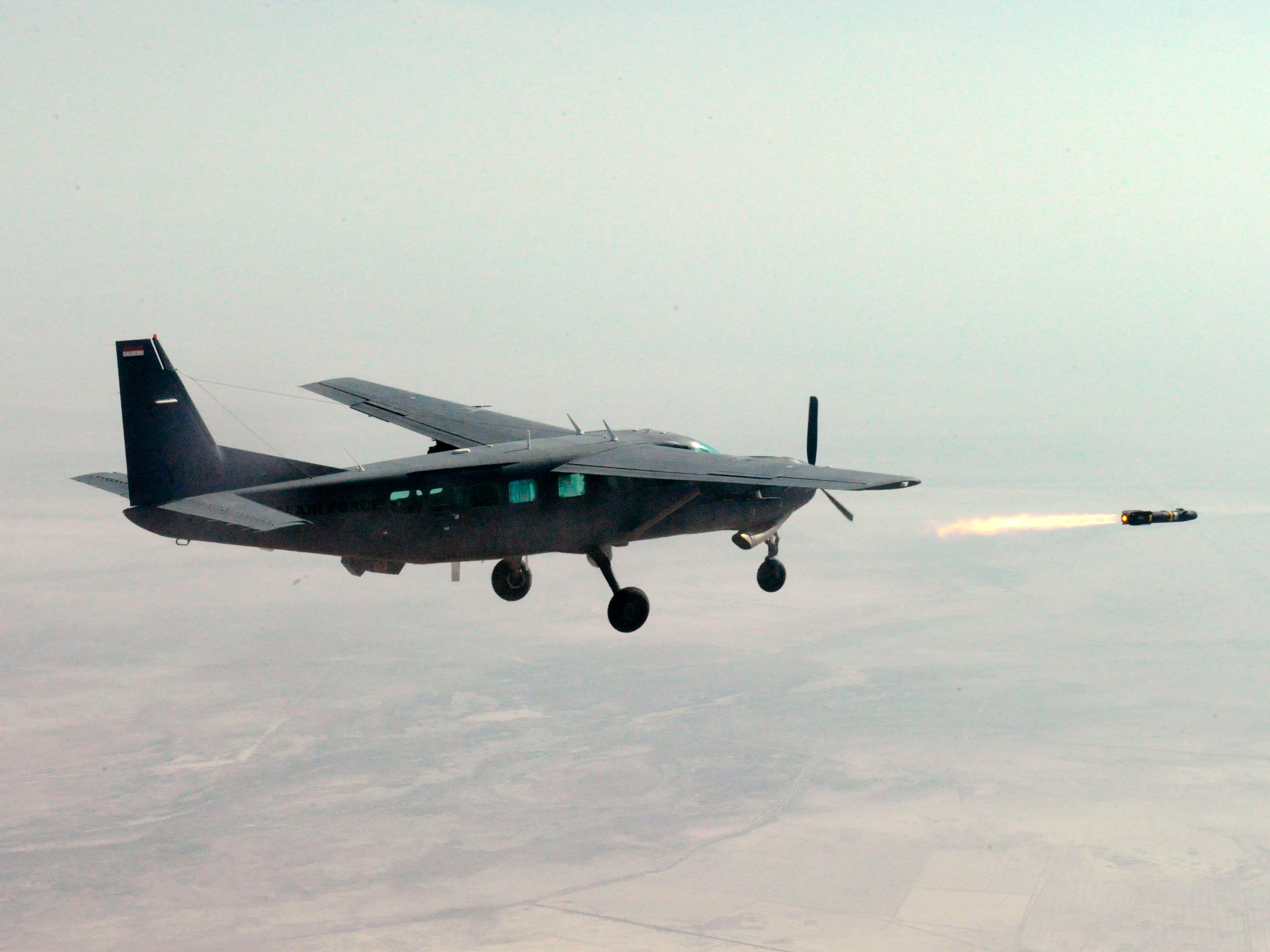
Iraqi Air Force AC-208 Caravan launches a Hellfire missile

- Beechcraft Super King Air
- Cessna AC-208 Combat Caravan
- KC-130J Harvest HAWK
- IOMAX Archangel
- AC-130W
- MQ-1 Predator
- MQ-1C Gray Eagle
- MQ-9 Reaper

=== Vessels ===
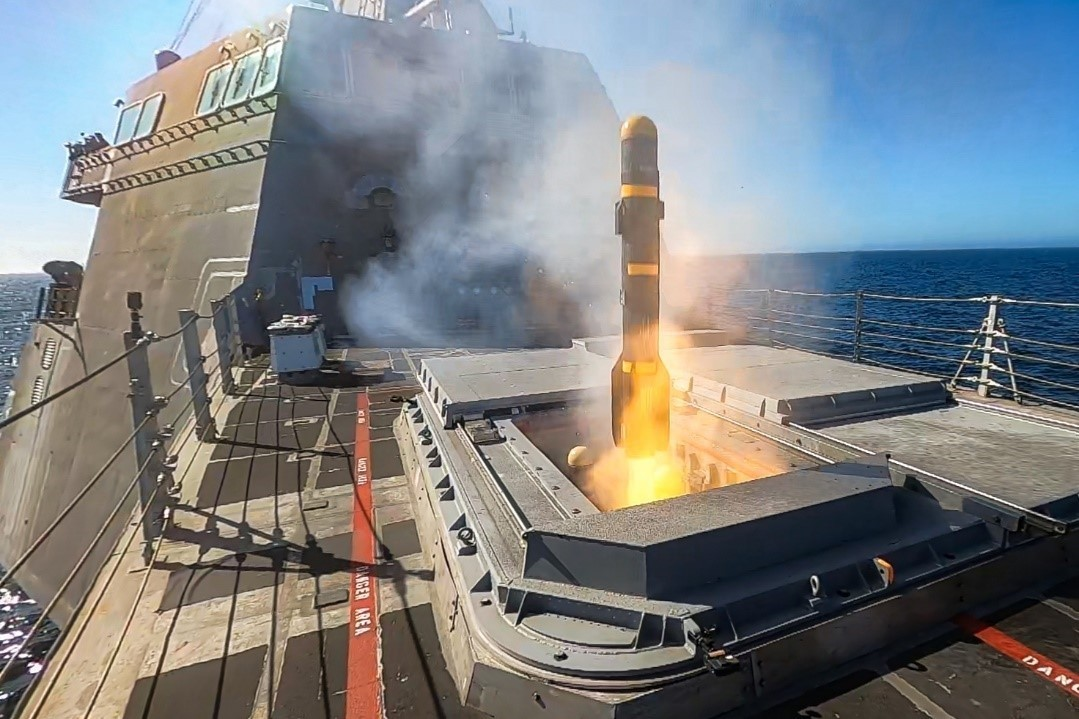
AGM-114L launch from USS Montgomery

- Super Dvora Mk III-class patrol boat, Israel
- Freedom-class littoral combat ship
- Independence-class littoral combat ship

=== Ground vehicles ===
- V2X Tempest

=== Experimental platforms ===
IFPC Longbow vs MQM-170 Outlaw 25 March 2016

The system has been tested for use on the Humvee and the Improved TOW Vehicle (ITV). Test shots have also been fired from a C-130 Hercules. Sweden and Norway use the Hellfire for coastal defense and have conducted tests with Hellfire launchers mounted on the Combat Boat 90 coastal assault boat.

The US Navy evaluated the missile for use on the Freedom-class littoral combat ship and Independence-class littoral combat ship from 2014. The missile was successfully fired from a LCS in early 2017. This system was set to deploy by late 2019.

In 2016 the Longbow Hellfire was tested by the US Army using a 15-tube Multi-Mission Launcher mounted on a Family of Medium Tactical Vehicles (FMTV) truck. The MML is an Army-developed weapon system capable of deploying both surface-to-surface and surface-to-air missiles.

The Longbow Hellfire initially equipped the Maneuver Short-Range Air Defense (M-SHORAD) version of the Stryker to serve as a surface-to-air counter-drone missile, but in 2024 the U.S. Army prohibited its use on the platform after discovering that prolonged placement of the missiles on a ground vehicle created wear and tear that lead to potential safety concerns.

== Operators ==
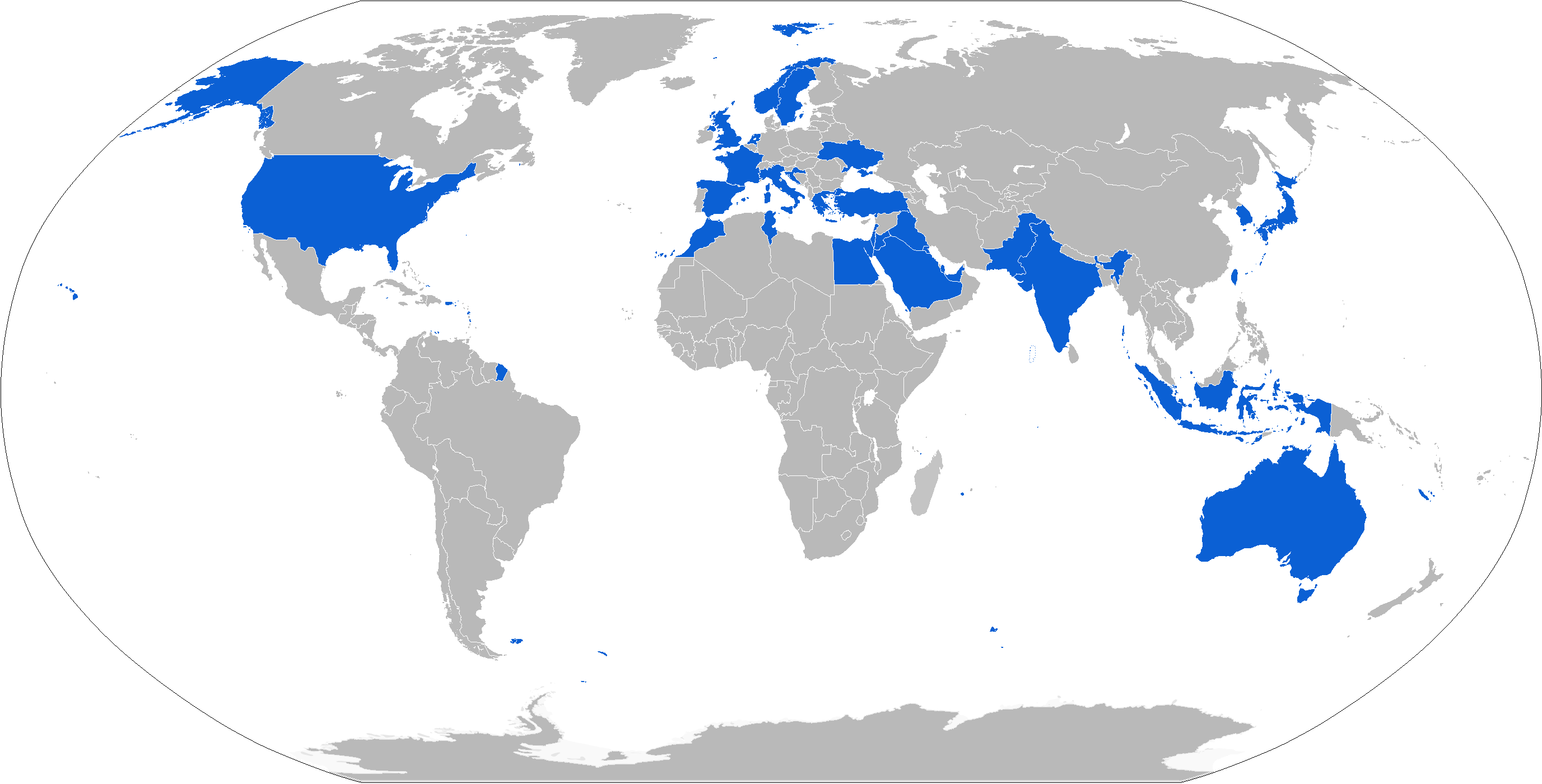
Map with Hellfire operators in blue

The following countries use the Hellfire:

- Australia
- Belgium
- Croatia
- Czech Republic
- Egypt
- France
- Greece
- India
- Indonesia
- Iraq
- Israel
- Italy
- Jordan
- Morocco
- Japan
- Kuwait
- Lebanon
- Netherlands
- Norway
- Pakistan
- Qatar
- Republic of Korea
- Saudi Arabia
- Singapore
- Spain
- Sweden, Robot 17
- Taiwan (Republic of China)
- Tunisia
- Turkey
- Ukraine, Robot 17
- United Arab Emirates
- United Kingdom
- United States

== See also ==
- 9M120 Ataka – (Soviet Union)
- 9K121 Vikhr – (Soviet Union)
- 9M123 Khrizantema – (Russia)
- AGM-169 Joint Common Missile – (United States)
- APKWS – (United States)
- AGM-176 Griffin – (United States)
- AGM-179 JAGM – (United States)
- Barq – (Pakistan)
- Brimstone – (United Kingdom)
- Direct Attack Guided Rocket – (United States)
- HJ-10 – (China)
- Mokopa – (South Africa)
- Nag – (India)
- PARS 3 LR – (Germany)
- Robot 17 – (Sweden)
- Spike – (Israel)
- UMTAS – (Turkey)
- Martlet (missile) – (United Kingdom)
- List of missiles
- United States Army Aviation and Missile Command
