= Z1 =

Z1, Z-1, or Z.1 may refer to:

== Government and economics ==
- Z.1 or the Flow of Funds, a U.S. government fiscal report

== Military and aerospace ==
- Admiralty scaffolding, an anti-tank barrier also known as Z.1
- Z-1 Suit, an experimental space suit
- AEG Z.1, a German aircraft built before World War I from Zagreb
- German destroyer Z1 Leberecht Maass, a World War II destroyer
- Goodyear Z-1, N-class blimps of the U.S. Navy
- HZ-1 Aerocycle, an experimental U.S. Army flying platform of the 1960s

== Transportation ==
- Z1 class Melbourne tram, a single-unit bogie tram built between 1975 and 1983
- Great Northern Railway Z-1 class, a class of electric locomotives used by the Great Northern Railway (U.S.)
- NER Class Z1, a class of British steam locomotives (redesignated class Z in 1914)
- Z1 (train service code), the train code for high-speed train between Shanghai and Beijing

=== Road ===
- BMW Z1, a two-seat roadster
- Kawasaki Z1, a motorcycle

== Computers and technology ==
- Z1 (computer), a mechanical computer designed by Konrad Zuse from 1935 to 1936
- Sony HVR-Z1, a HDV format camcorder manufactured by Sony
- Sony Xperia Z1, a smartphone manufactured by Sony

== Media and entertainment ==
=== Television ===
- Z1 TV, a Czech TV channel
- Z1 Zagrebačka Televizija, a Croatian regional television network

=== Video games ===
- Z-1 (comics), a DC comics character
- Z1 Battle Royale, a 2018 video game
- Zork I, an interactive fiction computer game

=== Music ===
- Z-1 (band), a Japanese idol group

== Organizations ==
- Z1 Digital Studio, an international digital product studio based in Seville

== People ==
- Frederick Vanden Heuvel, British intelligence officer

== See also ==
- 1Z (disambiguation)
