= Zizzle =

Illinois toymaker active 2005–2009

Zizzle was a company based in Bannockburn, Illinois, United States, that made many types of electronics and toys based on original concepts as well as movie licenses. They are best known for a toy called "iZ".

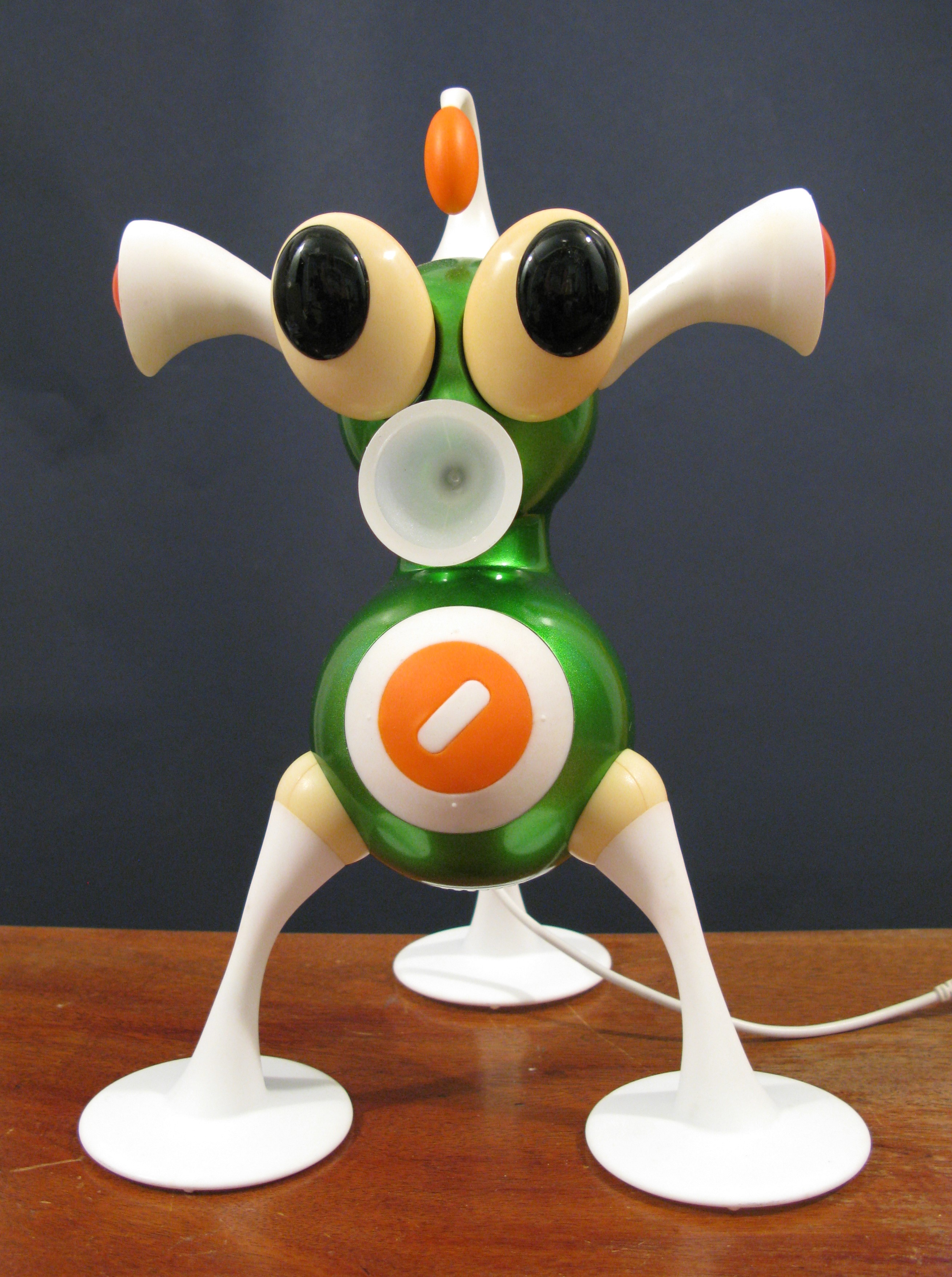
Zizzle iZ in green colorway

== History ==
The Zizzle company was founded in 2005 by Roger Shiffman, co-founder of Tiger Electronics, along with the marketing specialist behind Furby, Marc Rosenberg. Shiffman credits his wife for the name of the company.

The first toy released by the company was called "iZ", and received comparisons to the Furby.

The company received licenses to produce toys for Disney's Pirates of the Caribbean franchise, and also for Nickelodeon's SpongeBob SquarePants and Dora the Explorer cartoons.

In 2006, Zizzle held a Jack Sparrow Lookalike Contest at FAO Schwartz in New York City. Zizzle’s Jack Sparrow lookalike contest was a contest held by Zizzle LLC and FAO Schwarz on June 13, 2006 from 3:00 pm - 5:00 pm, where fans of the series could dress up as protagonist Captain Jack Sparrow, as well as other characters including Will Turner and Elizabeth Swann, and were judged based on how accurate their costumes and personality were to that of the character, as well as asked general questions about their costume, what they think about the series, and so on.

The judges for the contest included Janine DiGioacchino (General Manager of Madame Tussauds Wax Museum), Noah Robischon (Photojournalist for Entertainment Weekly), Carolina Bermudez (Z100 DJ), and most notably, Roger Shiffman (former CEO of Zizzle LLC).

Ron Rodriguez had won first place in the contest, receiving a new Volvo XC90 filled with Zizzle branded Pirates of the Caribbean toys in reward for his efforts. 2nd place had been Toby Markham, who received $2500 and a bunch of Zizzle Pirates toys, and in 3rd place was Chris Leidenfros, who received $1000 and a bunch of Zizzle Pirates toys, with both the toys in 2nd and 3rd place being given to the runner-ups in their own treasure chests.

Zizzle shut down in 2009.

== Toys and licences ==
- Zizzle iZ Toy
- Zoundz music mixing toy with RFID sound selection pieces (in association with Big Monster Toys)
- Disney's Pirates of the Caribbean 1:18 scale action figures and playsets
- Marvel Comics' Zizzlingers

== See also ==
- Action figure
