= 1Z =

1Z may refer to:

== Arts and entertainment ==
- 1Z Entertainment, a Philippine entertainment company.

== Helicopters ==
- AH-1Z; see H-1 upgrade program, US military helicopter program
  - Bell AH-1Z Viper
  - AH-1Z Super Cobra; see Bell AH-1 SuperCobra

== Other ==
- SSH 1Z (WA); see List of former state highways in Washington
- A prefix for tracking numbers used by United Parcel Service

== See also ==
- Z1 (disambiguation)
