= Robot 17 =

Anti-ship Missile

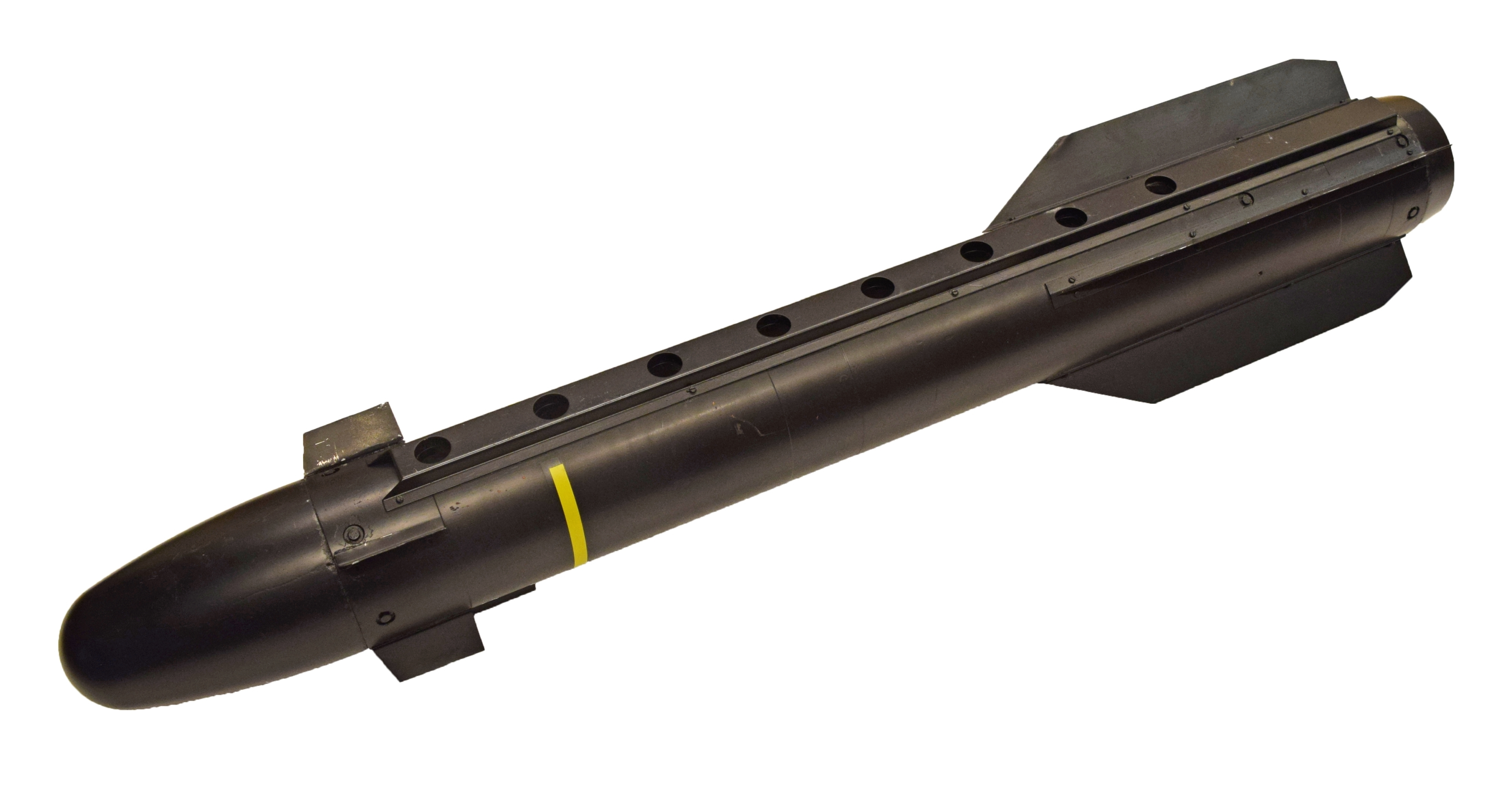
- Robot 17
- Type: Anti-ship missile
- Place of origin: Sweden; United States

Service history
- In service: In active service
- Used by: Ukraine; Sweden
- Wars: 2022 Russian invasion of Ukraine

Production history
- Designer: Bofors
- Manufacturer: Bofors
- Unit cost: £25,000 Per Missile

Specifications
- Mass: Weights: 9 kg (20 lb) Warhead; 48 kg (106 lb) Total
- Length: 163 cm (64 in)
- Width: 17.8 cm (7.0 in)
- Effective firing range: 8 km (5 mi)
- Maximum speed: 450 m/s (1,000 mph; Mach 1.3)
- Guidance system: Laser-guided

Robot 17 (Swedish: Robotsystem 17) is a Swedish anti-ship missile based on the American AGM-114C Hellfire, further developed by Bofors to work against sea targets and be transported and fired on land.

== Adoption ==
=== Sweden ===
The system is used by Swedish Amphibious Corps (Swedish: Amfibiekåren), which uses high-speed boats to transport it between land and islands, after which disembarked soldiers can then quickly position the system and make it ready to fire.

By creating a moving and unpredictable threat from anti-ship missiles along the Swedish coast, the Swedish Armed Forces intends to "make it more difficult for an opponent to enter ships in the Swedish archipelago or ports".

=== Ukraine ===
In June 2022, Sweden publicly stated their intent to assist Ukraine against Russia's invasion of Ukraine by sending a number of Robot 17.

In October 2022, evidence appeared on social media suggesting that Ukrainian Ground Forces had started using the weapons in an ad-hoc land attack role.
