= IZ (toy) =

Electronic musical toy made by Zizzle

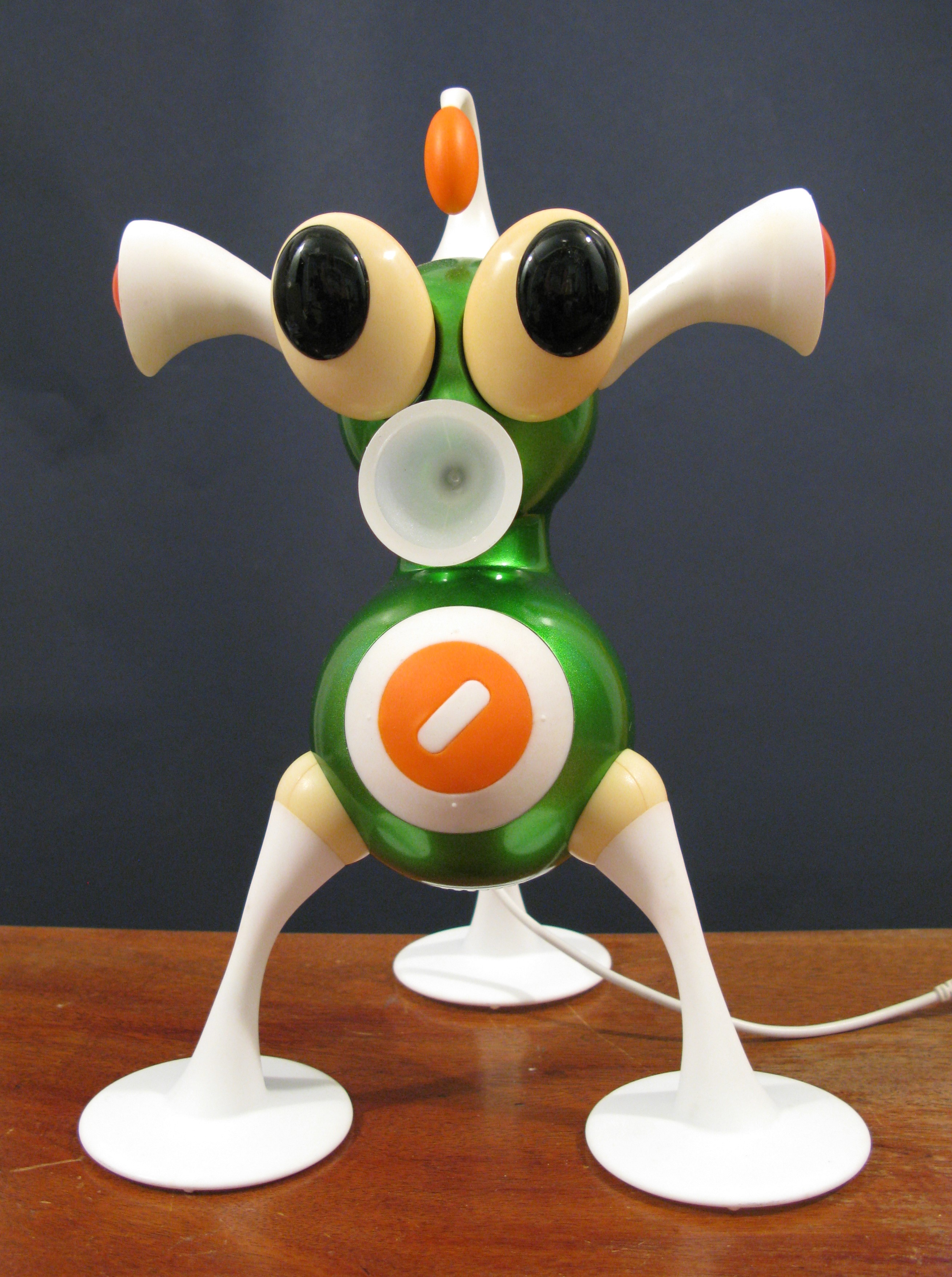
Front view of a Zizzle iZ toy in the green/orange color variant.

The IZ (stylized as iZ) is an electronic musical toy released in September 2005 from Zizzle. Taking the shape of an extraterrestrial tripod creature, the iZ allows users to interactively manipulate music by twisting particular parts of the figure's body as well as add sound effects to pre-recorded sound from a connected audio device. The toy also acts as a dancing speaker. It stands 12 inches tall and came in five color schemes: green/orange, dark blue/light blue, red/yellow, purple/green, and chrome/orange.

iZ was developed by Roger Shiffman, who also created the Giga Pets, Furby and Poo-Chi toys. It was explicitly explained during the development phase that a "new Furby" was the aim. iZ is designed to seem like it has a life of its own and does things out of its user's control when there is interaction with it.

In 2006, McDonald's had a promotion for a simpler 6-inch tall version the toy with Happy Meal. These made music or light in various colors, such as grey, yellow, pink, red, black, purple, blue, orange, and more. These toys had many different color schemes. There were 18 toys in the U.S. Happy Meal set, 6 in the U.K. set, 4 in the Mexico set, 4 in the Brazil set, and 7 in the Australia set.

== Modes of operation ==
iZ has three adjustable legs, and a few methods for input: an audio jack to connect other audio devices; trumpet-like ears that are twist-able; a touch-sensitive tentacle, called a flicker, on the toy's head; and five buttons variously placed on its stomach. For output the iZ has a built-in speaker, a nose that lights up in different colors and eyes driven by small motors, making them able to move up and down.

When another audio device is connected to iZ, the toy acts as a speaker, and also overlays some sound effects on top of the sound from the audio device. When overlaying its own sound effects, the toy also moves and its nose illuminates. By pressing the left side of its stomach, the sound effects will be turned off and iZ will only act as a regular speaker.

When no other audio device is connected iZ has three modes of operation: Play, DJ and WZIZ FM.

In Play mode (the start-up mode), iZ lets the user compose their own music by manipulating his inputs. Each ear corresponds to one audio track, the tummy controls the drum track and tempo, and the flicker can be hit for iZ to generate sound effects. iZ randomly adds his own flavor to the track by overlaying silly comments or radio noise.

When in DJ mode, iZ evolves the track himself by changing one feature of the track at a time. The user can force iZ to change the ongoing music outputs by pressing the toy's stomach. No interaction is allowed in this mode, so when the user tries any input which will change the track, a simple sound is played to indicate that he registered the input but will not react to it.

As stated in iZ's manual, "Although he is not a radio, he thinks he is". In WZIZ FM mode, iZ creates a fully new track every time he makes a change and inserts a noise to simulate the tuning of radio stations between the tracks. If you adjust the ears, which are supposed to be the antenna, you can make iZ create a new random track instantly.

== Animated adaptation ==
Zizzle and DIC Entertainment (now WildBrain) created a direct-to-video series, iZ and the Zizzles in 2006. The trailer could be viewed on the Zizzle website. Two episodes were made, being the pilot and a second episode, "Will the Zizzles Sizzle or Fizzle?"
