= Tuguldur Gantogtokh =

Mongolian footballer (born 2005)

Tuguldur Gantogtokh Гантогтохын Төгөлдөр
Personal information
- Date of birth: 19 January 2005 (age 21)
- Place of birth: Mongolia
- Position: Forward

Team information
- Current team: České Budějovice
- Number: 15

Youth career
- 2014–2019: Arvis
- 2019–2022: Meteor Tábor
- 2022–2023: České Budějovice

Senior career*
Years	Team	Apps	(Gls)
2023–	České Budějovice	5	(1)
2024–	→ České Budějovice B	37	(10)

International career^{‡}
2019	Mongolia U17	4	(0)
2024–	Mongolia	2	(0)
- * Club domestic league appearances and goals as of 28 May 2026 ‡ National team caps and goals as of 00:18, 30 March 2024 (UTC)

Tuguldur Gantogtokh (Mongolian: Гантогтохын Төгөлдөр; born 19 January 2005) is a Mongolian professional footballer who plays as a forward for the Czech club Dynamo České Budějovice.

== Club career ==
Gantogtokh began his career with Mongolian club Athletic Club of Bilbao at age nine. He remained with the club until 2019 when his parents decided to relocate to the Czech Republic. Upon arriving in the country, he joined local side FK Meteor Tábor. For the 2021–22 season, he was promoted to the club's reserve team. He was called the "discovery of the season" by his head coach after scoring five goals in seven matches after joining the side. One of his goals was the game-winner against SK Ratibořské Hory in September 2021. With the win, the team sat at the top of the table. The team went on to win the league that season with Gantogtokh as the league's top scorer with forty-five goals in twenty-four matches.

In summer 2022, Czech First League club SK Dynamo České Budějovice took note of Gantogtokh's performance with Tábor and invited the player to join its academy after an impressive trial. On 6 September 2023, he made his first appearance for the first team, coming on as a second-half substitute for Patrik Hellebrand in a friendly against Austrian club LASK Linz. He made his competitive league debut for the first team on 11 November 2023. He entered as an 82nd-minute substitute in the eventual 0–1 defeat to FK Teplice. With the appearance, he became the first-ever player from Mongolia to appear in the Czech top division. On 16 November 2023, he made his Czech Cup debut in a 1–2 Fourth Round defeat to FK Jablonec.

On 13 February 2025, Gantogtokh signed his first professional contract with SK Dynamo České Budějovice.

== International career ==
Gantogtokh represented Mongolia at the youth level in 2020 AFC U-16 Championship qualification. He made four appearances in the campaign. He received his first call-up to the senior national team in March 2024 for 2024 FIFA Series matches against Tanzania and hosts Azerbaijan.

== Career statistics ==
As of match played 12 November 2023

Appearances and goals by club, season and competition
Club	Season	League			Czech Cup		Other		Total	
Club	Season	Division	Apps	Goals	Apps	Goals	Apps	Goals	Apps	Goals
Dynamo České Budějovice	2023–24	Czech First League	1	0	1	0	0	0	2	0
Dynamo České Budějovice	Dynamo České Budějovice total		1	0	1	0	0	0	2	0
Career total			1	0	1	0	0	0	2	0

=== International ===
As of match played 25 March 2024

Mongolia
Year	Apps	Goals
2024	2	0
Total	2	0
