= Immobilien Zeitung =

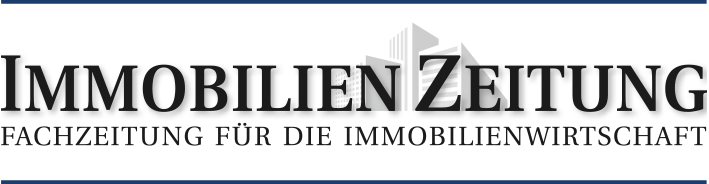
- Publisher: IZ Immobilien Zeitung Verlagsgesellschaft mbH
- Editor: Thomas Porten
- Staff writers: 75
- Founded: 1993
- Headquarters: Wiesbaden
- ISSN: 1433-7878
- Website: www.iz.de

The Immobilien Zeitung is a weekly specialist journal for the German real estate industry. Apart from a weekly printed issue, there is a daily newsletter as well as the news homepage www.immobilien-zeitung.de. The printed edition is read by 9,134 subscribers per week and about 3,7 readers per copy. The newsletter is read by up to 35,000 readers daily.

Immobilien Zeitung Verlagsgesellschaft is based in Wiesbaden. (management, administrative department, and main editorial office). A group of correspondents working from Berlin, Hamburg, Stuttgart and Munich deals with local topics. Apart from the Immobilien Zeitung, the publishing house publishes books and magazines concerning the real estate industry. It also runs the online market place IZ-shop.de, where specialist literature for the real estate industry is sold.

The Immobilien Zeitung highly supports the job market of the real estate industry by conducting a job offensive as well as an annual job market survey. IZ-Jobs.de was established as an employment website for the real estate industry. In cooperation with Heuer Dialog, the Immobilien Zeitung organizes the IZ-Karriereforum (IZ career forum), an annual job fair for the real estate industry. Moreover, the publishing house supports projects to improve training and further education in the German real estate industry.

In 2002, the Immobilien Zeitung initiated the foundation of the Rat der Immobilienweisen (committee of real estate experts). This committee analyses the German real estate market on a regular basis and publishes spring reports. Since 2003, the publishing house is partner of the MIPIM Awards, the most renowned international award of the real estate industry.

Since 2007, the media group Deutscher Fachverlag (dfv, Frankfurt) holds a share of 55% in the IZ Immobilien Zeitung Verlagsgesellschaft. The Immobilien Zeitung holds a share of 66% in the seminar and congress organizer Heuer Dialog.

The publishing house has about 55 employees, 27 of which constitute the editorial office. The entire media group Immobilien Zeitung fully consolidated employs 75 people.
