= Precision Attack Air-to-Surface Missile =

American air-to-surface missile project

The Precision Attack Air-to-Surface Missile (PAASM) is a weapon system currently under development by Raytheon. It is designed to defeat armored vehicles, buildings, hardened bunkers and small naval targets. The missile uses technology developed for the Joint Common Missile (JCM) and Precision Attack Missile (PAM) programs.

== Launch platforms (planned) ==
- AH-64 Apache
- AH-1 Super Cobra
- MH-60 Pave Hawk

== Specifications ==
- Length: 63–66 in.
- Diameter: 7 in.
- Weight: 115-120 lb.
- Range: 20+ km.
- Guidance: Tri-Mode millimeter wave (MMW) active radar homing, imaging infrared (IIR) and semi-active laser (SAL) seeker.

== Program status ==
- December 2005 - Successful test firing from rotary-wing UAV.
