= Bell AH-1Z Viper =

American attack helicopter

AH-1Z Viper
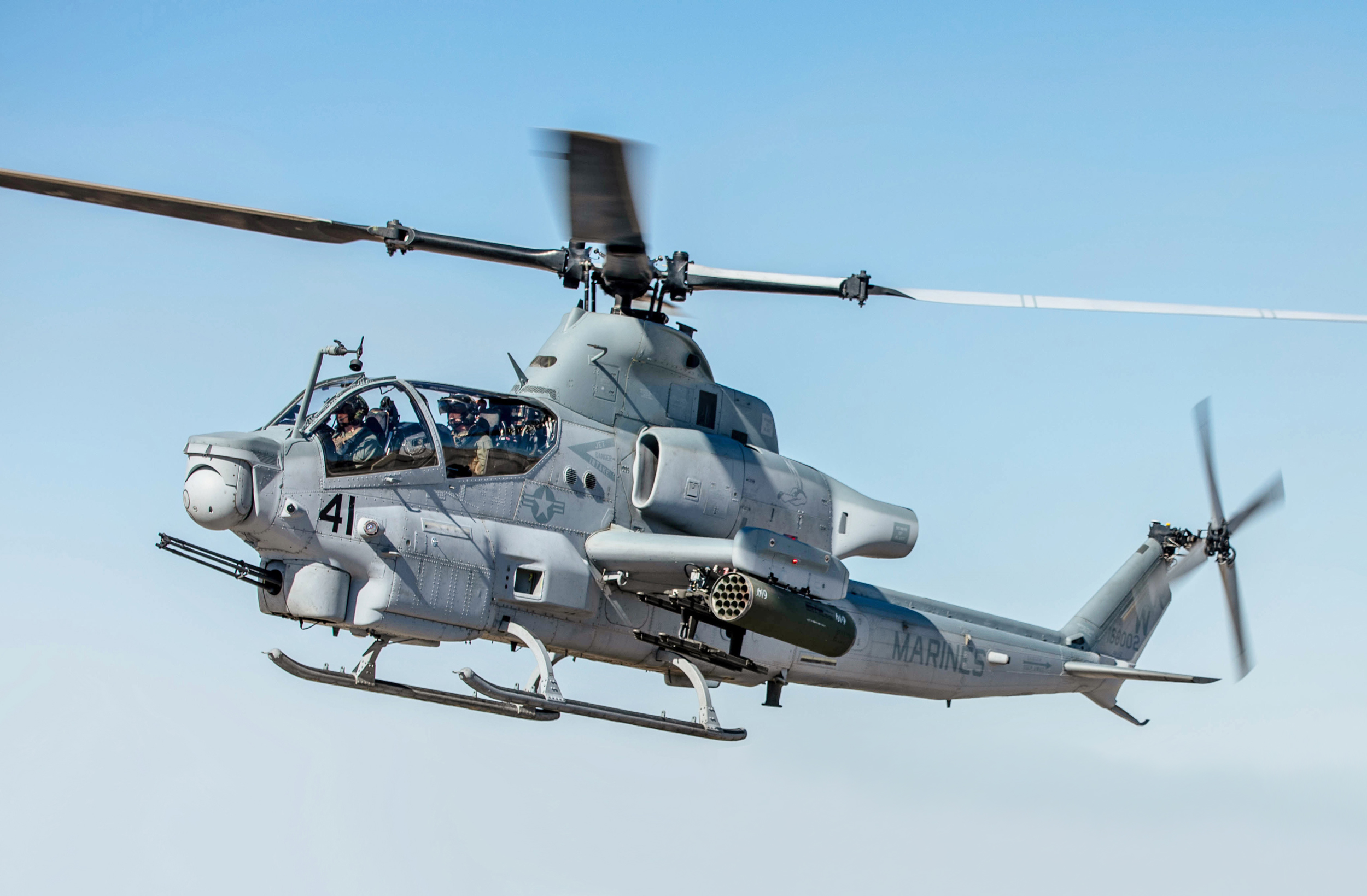
- An AH-1Z of the USMC

General information
- Type: Attack helicopter
- National origin: United States
- Manufacturer: Bell Helicopter
- Status: In service
- Primary users: United States Marine Corps Royal Bahraini Air Force; Czech Air Force
- Number built: 195

History
- Manufactured: 2000–present
- Introduction date: 30 September 2010
- First flight: 8 December 2000
- Developed from: Bell AH-1 SuperCobra

The Bell AH-1Z Viper is a twin-engine attack helicopter, based on the AH-1W SuperCobra, designed and produced by the American aerospace manufacturer Bell Helicopter. It is one of the latest members of the prolific Bell Huey family. It is often called "Zulu Cobra", based on the military phonetic alphabet pronunciation of its variant letter.

The AH-1Z was developed in the 1990s and 2000s as a part of the H-1 upgrade program on behalf of the United States Marine Corps (USMC). It is essentially a modernisation of the service's existing AH-1Ws, and was originally intended to be a rebuild program before subsequent orders were made for new-build helicopters instead. The AH-1Z and Bell UH-1Y Venom utility helicopter share a common tailboom, engines, rotor system, drivetrain, avionics architecture, software, controls and displays for over 84% identical components. It features a four-blade, bearingless, composite main rotor system, uprated transmission, and a new target sighting system amongst other improvements. In December 2000, the AH-1Z conducted its maiden flight. Low-rate initial production was launched in October 2003.

In September 2010, the USMC declared that the AH-1Z had attained combat readiness. It fully replaced the preceding AH-1W Super Cobra in October 2020. The type forms a key element of the Aviation Combat Element (ACE) taskforce, which support all phases of USMC expeditionary operations. Since its introduction, the USMC has pursued upgrades, such as installing Link 16 datalink and outfitting it with the AGM-179A Joint Air-to-Ground Missile (JAGM). The AH-1Z has regularly competed with the Boeing AH-64 Apache for export orders. The first export customer was the Royal Bahraini Air Force. The Czech Air Force has also ordered the type. At one point, Pakistan was set to operate its own AH-1Zs, but deliveries were blocked due to political factors.

== Development ==
=== Background ===
Aspects of the AH-1Z can be traced back to the experimental Bell 249 of 1979, which was essentially an upgraded AH-1S, equipped with the four-blade main rotor system from the Bell 412 utility helicopter. The Bell 249 was used as a demonstrator for Bell's Cobra II concept, and made an appearance at the Farnborough Airshow in 1980. As promoted by Bell, the Cobra II was to be equipped with new and redesigned combat systems, which included the AGM-114 Hellfire air-to-ground missile, a new targeting system, and improved engines.

The further-developed Cobra 2000 proposal included the General Electric T700 engine and a four-blade rotor. While Bell's proposal generated some interest within the US Marine Corps, funding was not forthcoming to pursue its development at that time. In 1993, Bell opted to enter an AH-1W-based variant for the UK's new attack helicopter program. This derivative, named the CobraVenom, featured a modern digital cockpit and could carry wire-guided missiles, Hellfire or Brimstone missiles. The CobraVenom design was further refined two years later, notably by the adoption of a four-blade rotor system. In 1995, a rival bid for the AH-64D Apache Longbow was selected to fulfil the program instead.

=== H-1 upgrade program ===
AH-1Z conducting live-fire (1:44)
AH-1Z Vipers conduct live-fire air assault support exercise at the Chocolate Mountain Aerial Gunnery Range, 2019

In 1996, the USMC launched the H-1 upgrade program, contracting with Bell Helicopter to upgrade 180 AH-1Ws into AH-1Zs, and upgrading 100 UH-1Ns into UH-1Ys. The H-1 program created completely modernized attack and utility helicopters with considerable design commonality to reduce operating costs. The AH-1Z and UH-1Y share a common tailboom, engines, rotor system, drivetrain, avionics architecture, software, controls and displays for over 84% identical components.

Bell participated in a joint government test team during the engineering manufacturing and development phase of the H-1 program. Research and development progressed slowly from 1996 to 2003. The existing two-blade semi-rigid, teetering rotor system was replaced with a four-blade, hingeless, bearingless rotor system. The four-blade configuration provides improvements in flight characteristics including increased flight envelope, maximum speed, vertical rate of climb, payload and reduced rotor vibration level.

The AH-1Z first flew on 8 December 2000. Bell delivered three prototype aircraft to the United States Navy's Naval Air Systems Command at Naval Air Station Patuxent River in July 2002, for the flight test phase of the program. Low-rate initial production began in October 2003, with deliveries running to 2018. In late 2006, a contract was awarded to Meggitt Defense Systems to develop a new linkless 20 mm ammunition handling system to improve on the gun feed reliability of the existing linked feed system.

In February 2008, the U.S. Navy adjusted the contract so the last 40 AH-1Zs were built as new airframes instead of the previously planned rebuild of AH-1Ws. In September 2008, the Navy requested an additional 46 airframes for the Marine Corps, bringing the total number ordered to 226. In 2010, the Marine Corps ordered 189 AH-1Zs, with 58 of them being new airframes, with deliveries to continue until 2022. In December 2010, the Department of the Navy approved the AH-1Z for full-rate production.

In November 2022, Bell delivered the 189th AH-1Z to the U.S. Marine Corps, completing the program of record for the Viper. Combined with the 160 UH-1Y airframes which completed delivery in 2018, it marked the final deliveries of the H-1 series rotorcraft for the U.S. military since deliveries began in 1959.

== Design ==
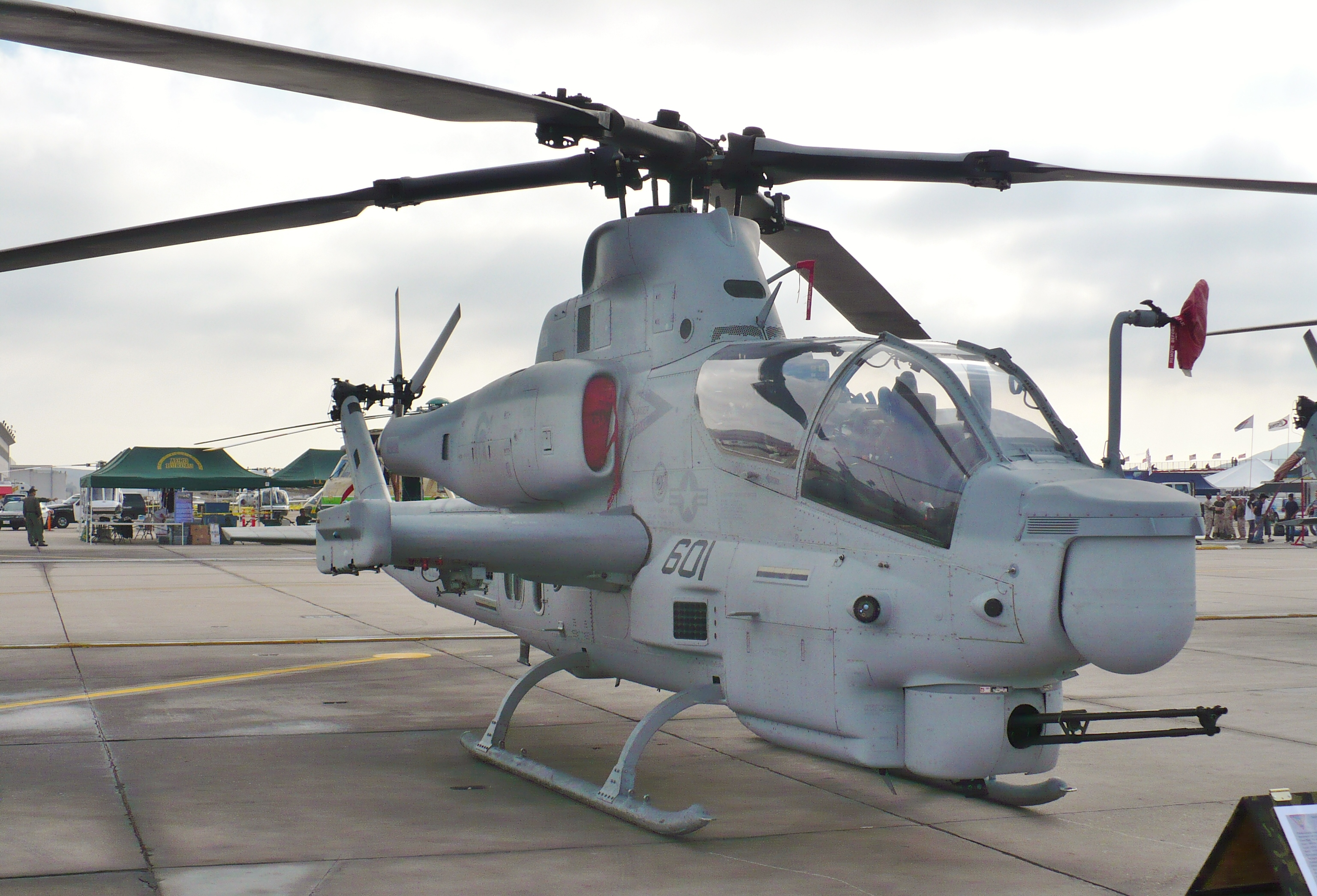
An AH-1Z at an air show displaying four-blade rotors and longer-span stub wings

The Bell AH-1Z Viper is an attack helicopter derived from the earlier Bell AH-1 SuperCobra. When contrasted against its predecessor, it incorporates improvements and advances, including new rotor technology, upgraded military avionics, updated weapons systems, and electro-optical sensors in an integrated weapons platform. Amongst other advantages provided by these changes, it has improved survivability and can locate targets at longer ranges and attack them using precision weapons.

An AH-1Z firing an AGM-179 JAGM and 2.75-inch (70 mm) Hydra 70 rockets

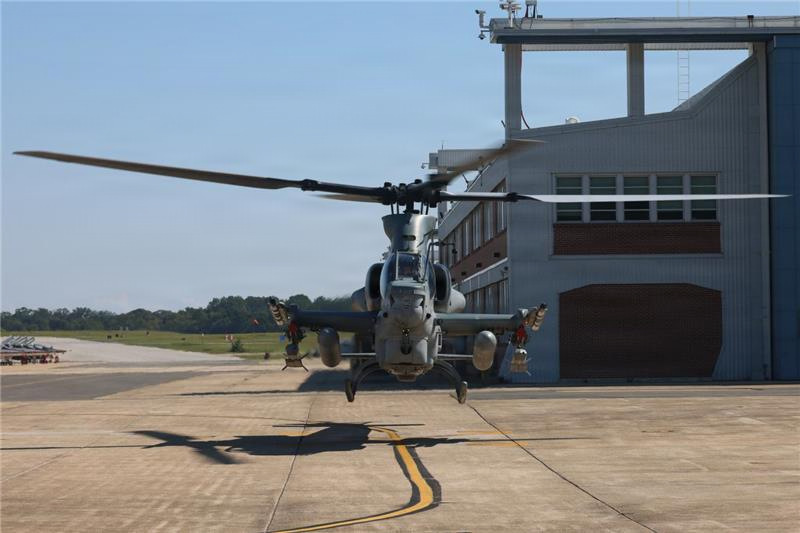
An AH-1Z Viper equipped with Precision Attack Strike Munitions during testing in late 2025

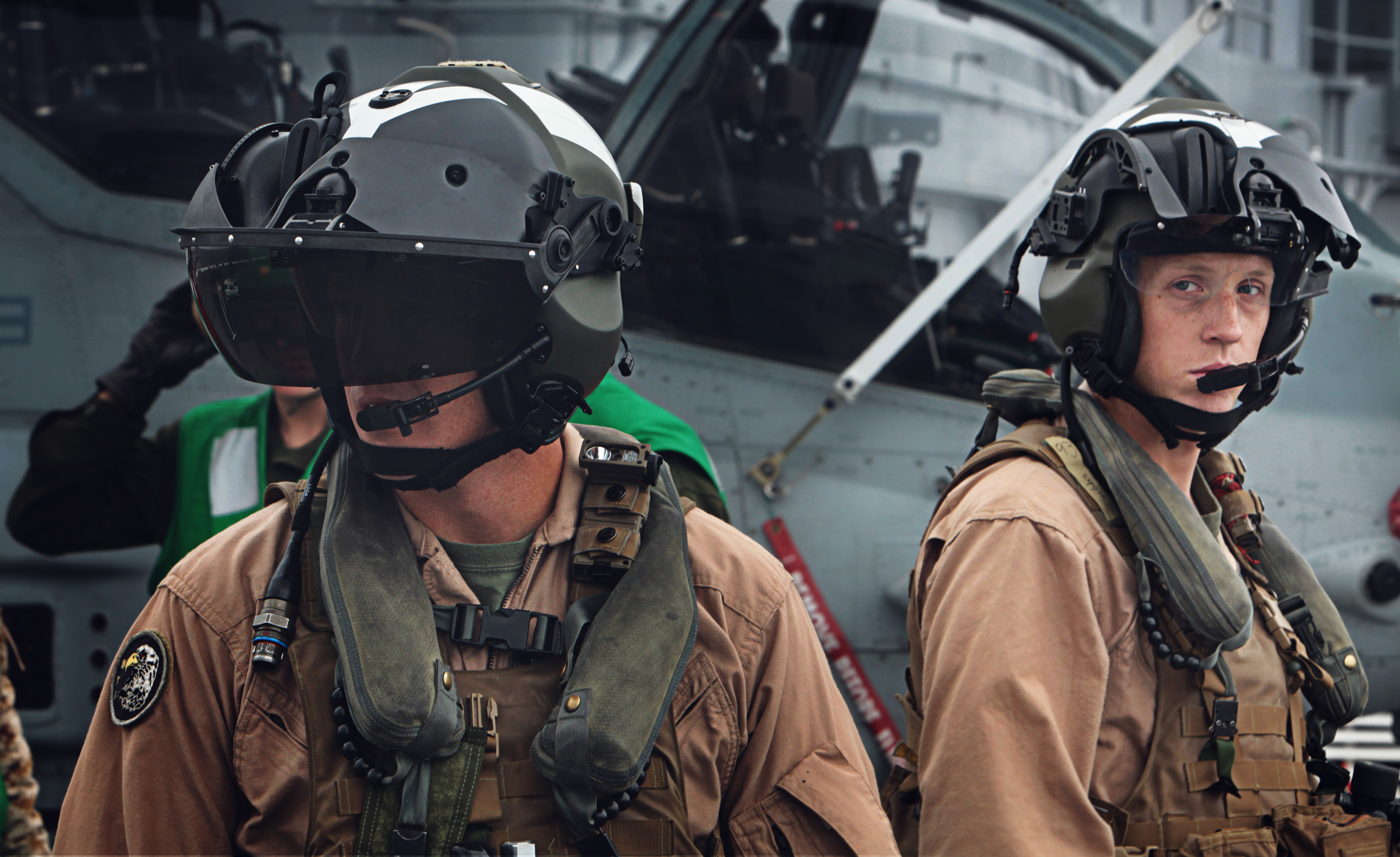
AH-1Z pilots aboard USS Makin Island wearing helmet mounted displays (displays not shown)

The airframe was extensively redesigned to maximise crashworthiness. Measures include energy-absorbing landing gear, fuel vapor inerting systems, self-sealing fuel tanks, energy-attenuating crashworthy seating, and a mass retention design approach applied to many major components. Active systems include countermeasure dispensers, radar warning, incoming/on-way missile warning, on-fuselage laser spot warning systems, and the Hover Infrared Suppression System (HIRSS) to protect the engine exhausts.

The AH-1Z is equipped with a bearingless and hingeless rotor system that has 75% fewer parts than four-bladed articulated systems. The rotor blades are composed of composites, which give them increased ballistic survivability. The rotor is equipped with a semi-automatic folding system, enabling the AH-1Z to be stored more efficiently aboard amphibious assault ships and other means of transportation. Efforts were made to maximise its maintainability and to minimise maintenance requirements. In comparison to the SuperCobra, numerous maintenance tasks have been eliminated, interactive electronic technical manuals have been produced, less spares storage is required, and accessibility has been improved. Fault detection sensors facilitate condition-based maintenance.

The AH-1Z is equipped with a pair of redesigned stub wings, of substantially longer span than those of the preceding SuperCobra. Each one has an additional wingtip station for a missile such as the AIM-9 Sidewinder. Each stub wing has two other stations for 2.75-inch (70 mm) Hydra 70 rocket pods, or AGM-114 Hellfire quad missile launchers. In early 2022 Initial Operational Capability (IOC) was reached with the AGM-179 JAGM. It uses the same type of missile launchers as the Hellfires.

The AN/APG-78 Longbow fire control radar can be mounted on a wingtip station. Other mission equipment can be fitted to these stations, including 77 and 100 gallon external auxiliary fuel tanks, LUU-2A/B nighttime illumination flares, and numerous types of practice munitions. Underneath the nose of the AH-1Z is an A/A49E-7 turret fitted with a 20 mm (0.787 in) M197 three-barreled rotary cannon. This weapon has a higher muzzle velocity and flatter trajectory than predecessors, and is compatible with M50-series air-to-air rounds.

In January 2026, the U.S. Marine Corps awarded an $86.2 million contract to L3Harris Technologies, through Naval Air Systems Command, to produce the Red Wolf missile system under the Precision Attack Strike Munition (PASM) program, with delivery of munitions, training, and support equipment planned by the end of fiscal year 2027. The Precision Attack Strike Munition (PASM) is a U.S. Marine Corps program to field a long-range, cost-effective, precision-guided weapon for AH-1Z Viper attack helicopters to enhance maritime and land strike capabilities. Red Wolf, part of L3Harris’ Wolf Pack family, is designed to deliver kinetic effects. Its counterpart, Green Wolf, provides non-kinetic electronic warfare capabilities, together enabling autonomous, long-range engagements out to 200 nautical miles (370 km) against maritime and land targets.

The cockpit of the AH-1Z has been designed so that both crewmembers have virtually identical controls. It can be flown from the front or rear positions. These positions incorporate a Hands on Collective and Stick (HOCAS) side-stick architecture, which enables many functions to be carried out by the pilot without moving their hands from the flight controls. Both of the two crew stations have a pair of 8×6-inch multifunction liquid crystal displays (LCD) and a single 4.2×4.2-inch dual function LCD.

The AH-1Z has an integrated avionics system developed by Northrop Grumman. This system includes two mission computers and an automatic flight control system. The communications suite combines a U.S. Navy RT-1824 integrated radio, UHF/VHF, COMSEC and modem into a single unit. The navigation suite includes an embedded GPS inertial navigation system, a digital map system and Meggitt's low-airspeed air data subsystem, which allows weapons delivery when hovering.

Crew members are equipped with the Thales "Top Owl" helmet-mounted sight and display system. This display provides a 24-hour day/night capability and a binocular display with a 40° field of view. Its visor projection provides forward-looking infrared (FLIR) or video imagery. It has been designed from the onset to accommodate in-service upgrades. The Lockheed Martin target sight system (TSS) incorporates a third-generation FLIR sensor which provides target sighting and identification in day, night, or adverse weather conditions. It is a passive sensor unlike radar, and untrackable. The TSS has various view modes and can track with FLIR or by TV. The same system is also used on the KC-130J Harvest HAWK.

== Operational history ==
=== United States ===
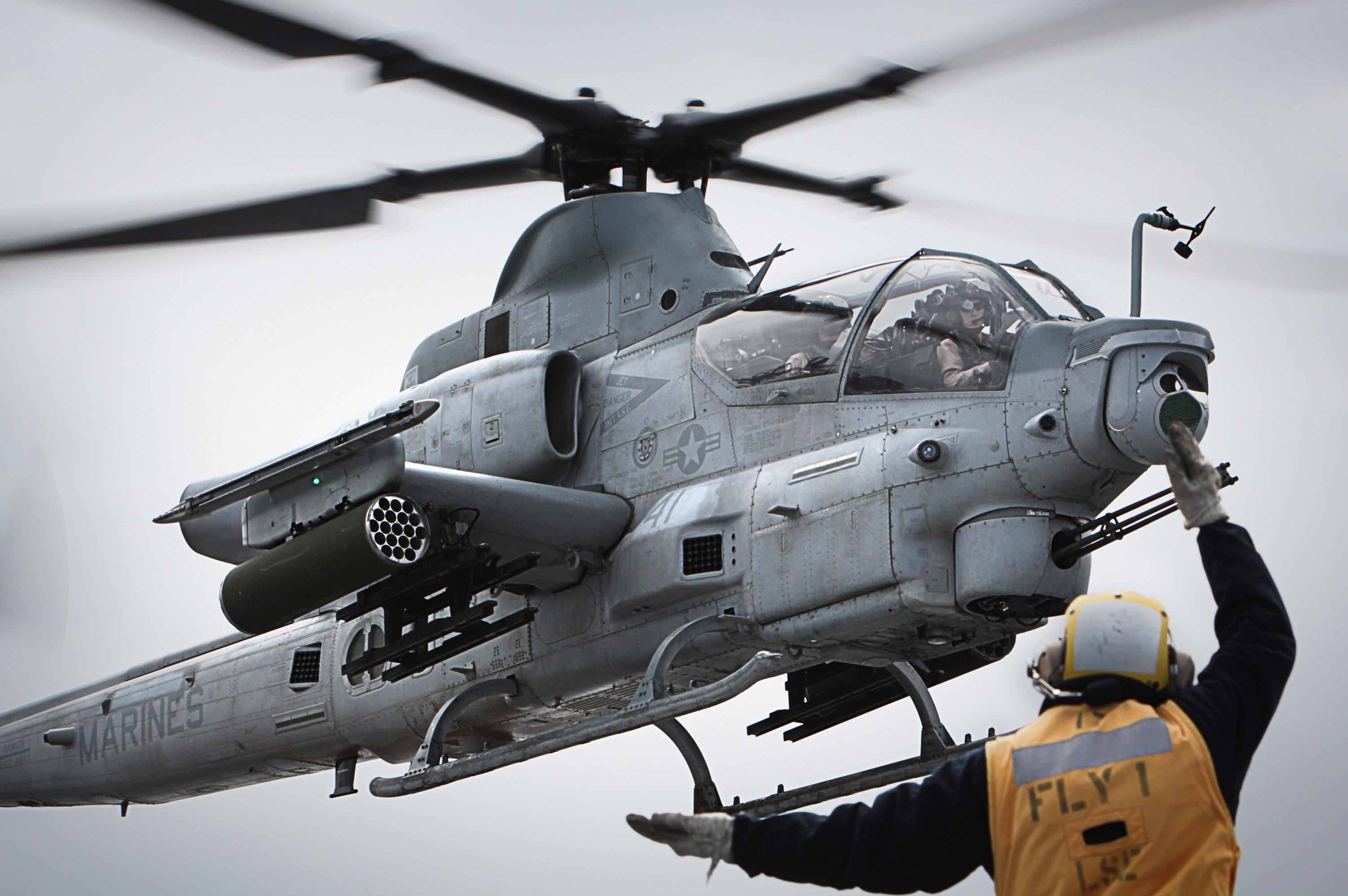
A U.S. Marine Corps AH-1Z lands on USS Makin Island in 2010.

In May 2005, the AH-1Z completed its first round of sea-based flight trials. In October 2005, the USMC, through the Naval Air Systems Command, accepted delivery of the first AH-1Z production standard helicopter. In early 2006, the AH-1Z and UH-1Y completed their developmental testing. In early 2006, initial examples of the type were transferred to the Operational Test Unit at the NAS Patuxent River to undergo operational evaluation (OPEVAL) testing. In February 2008, both the AH-1Z and UH-1Y began the second and final portion of OPEVAL testing. In September 2010, the USMC declared that the AH-1Z had attained combat readiness.

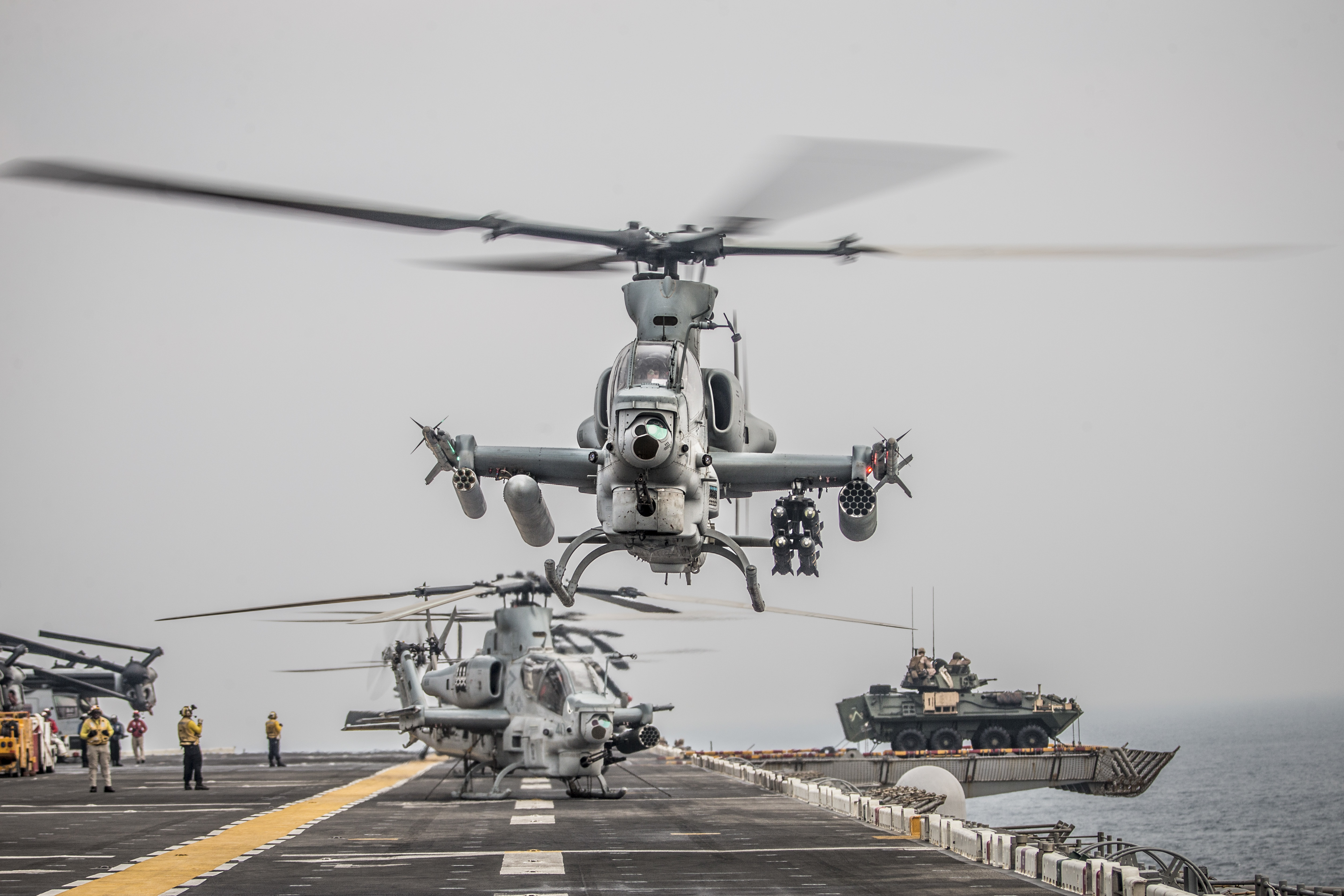
Armed USMC AH-1Zs on the flight deck of an amphibious assault ship

Since the type's introduction, numerous upgrades have been investigated and integrated. In March 2022, the AGM-179A Joint Air-to-Ground Missile (JAGM) achieved initial operational capability upon the AH-1Z. This munition will replace the Hellfire and Maverick missiles. As of early 2022, work to install kits to facilitate a Link 16 datalink upon both the AH-1Z and UH-1Y was underway.

In October 2020, the USMC withdrew of the last of its AH-1W Super Cobras. It has been entirely replaced by AH-1Z Vipers. In USMC service, the AH-1Z forms a key element of the Aviation Combat Element (ACE), a task-orientated force of supporting the USMC throughout all phases of its expeditionary operations. Key tasks in this capacity include offensive air support, anti-air warfare, assault support, and aerial reconnaissance.

In the early 2020s, there were debates over cutting as much as one-third of the USMC's attack helicopter fleet in order to reallocate budget to other capabilities. In May 2021, even as deliveries continued, several USMC AH-1Zs went into long-term storage at the 309th Aerospace Maintenance and Regeneration Group (AMARG) in Arizona as part of a wider restructuring effort.

=== Bahrain ===
In April 2018, the U.S. Defense Security Cooperation Agency received U.S. State Department approval and notified Congress of a possible sale to Bahrain of 12 AH-1Zs, 26 T-700 GE 401C engines, and armaments for an estimated cost of US$911.4 million (~$1.12 billion in 2024). In November 2018, Bahrain confirmed the order for 12 AH-1Zs. The first six were delivered in mid-2022.

In December 2022, production of AH-1Zs for Bahrain was completed. Final deliveries will be made in 2023.

=== Czech Republic ===
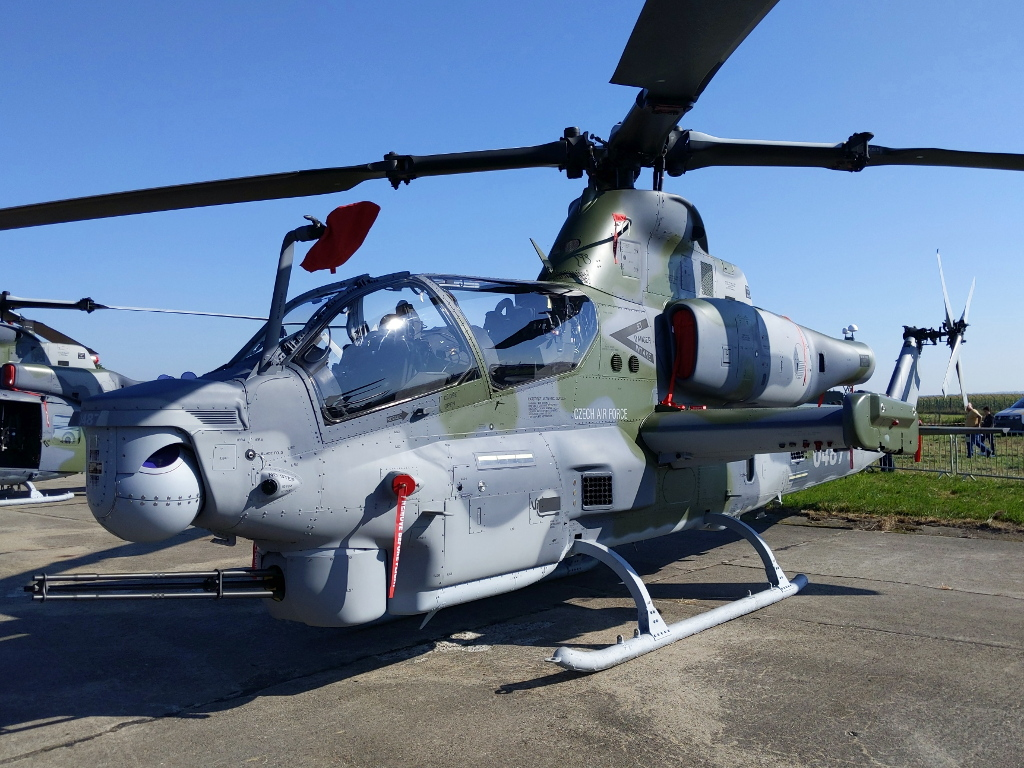
A Czech Air Force AH-1Z, NATO Days in Ostrava 2023

In 2016, Bell was interested in selling the AH-1Z to the Czech Republic, which sought to retire its Soviet-era Mil Mi-24 gunships. In December 2019, the Czech Republic bought four AH-1Zs for the Czech Air Force. In March 2022, Czech Defense Minister Jana Černochová announced plans to buy further helicopters, attributing this decision to the recent Russian invasion of Ukraine.

=== Other foreign interest ===
In the early 2010s, the AH-1Z was being offered to South Korea, competing against the AH-64 Apache and the TAI/AgustaWestland T129 ATAK attack helicopters. In April 2013, South Korea announced the selection of the rival AH-64E bid.

In April 2015, the U.S. State Department approved a possible Foreign Military Sales (FMS) to Pakistan for 15 AH-1Z Vipers with Hellfire missiles, associated equipment and support worth up to $952 million (~$1.23 billion in 2024). In early 2016, Pakistan was set to receive nine AH-1Zs by September 2018. Pakistan's order was placed on hold on account of political tensions between the U.S. and Pakistan. The order for 12 aircraft has not been cancelled. By May 2019, nine were built, but are stored at the 309th AMARG base, awaiting a resolution to the friction between the two countries.

In 2016, the Royal Moroccan Air Force was interested in procuring a number of AH-1Zs.

In November 2016, Bell Helicopter signed a memorandum of understanding with Romanian airspace company IAR – Ghimbav Brasov Group for potential collaboration on the AH-1Z. In August 2017, Romania signed a letter of intent with Bell Helicopter to establish a joint venture with Romanian state-owned ROMARM for the potential procurement of a number of AH-1Zs.

In 2017, Bell promoted the AH-1Z and the UH-1Y Venom to the Australian Army as a potential replacement for their existing fleet of Eurocopter Tiger attack helicopters. In January 2021, the Australian Government purchased the AH-64E Apache to replace its Tigers.

In July 2017, Bell Helicopter and Polish Armaments Group signed a letter of intent planning on cooperating on the UH-1Y and AH-1Z helicopters, forming a potential bid for the Polish Kruk attack helicopter acquisition program, part of a wider modernization effort. In March 2022, in light of Russia's invasion of Ukraine, Poland delayed a decision on new attack helicopters until after the completion of a sweeping security review.

In October 2017, Thailand's minister of Defence Prawit Wongsuwan stated that Thailand is looking into replacing its fleet of aging AH-1F Cobra attack helicopters and will launch a procurement committee to look into the matter. Royal Thai Army officials have said that they are interested in the AH-1Z, as well as the Agusta A129 Mangusta, Mil Mi-28, CAIC Z-10, Bell AH-1 SuperCobra and Boeing AH-64 Apache.

In April 2020, the U.S. Defense Security Cooperation Agency received U.S. State Department approval and notified Congress of a possible sale to the Philippines, of either six AH-1Z attack helicopters and related equipment for an estimated cost of $450 million, or six AH-64E Apache attack helicopters and related equipment for an estimated cost of $1.5 billion.

Nigeria has sought to procure AH-1Zs for some time. Sales were initially blocked by Congress over human rights concerns. In April 2022, the U.S. State Department gave its approval for the sale of the type along with support apparatus via a nearly $1 billion contract.

In March 2023, it was announced that Slovakia will receive twelve AH-1Zs at a discount, after Slovakia sent its retired MiG-29 fighters to Ukraine. In December 2024, Slovakia decided to procure 12 UH-60 Black hawks instead of AH-1Zs.

== Operators ==
A map with operators of the Bell AH-1Z in blue

Bahrain

- Royal Bahraini Air Force (six delivered out of twelve on order)

Czech Republic

- Czech Air Force (ten delivered) Six to be given via the Excess Defense Articles program with the one Viper remaining on order.

United States

- United States Marine Corps (189 delivered)

=== Future operators ===
Nigeria

- Nigerian Air Force (twelve on order).

== Specifications (AH-1Z) ==

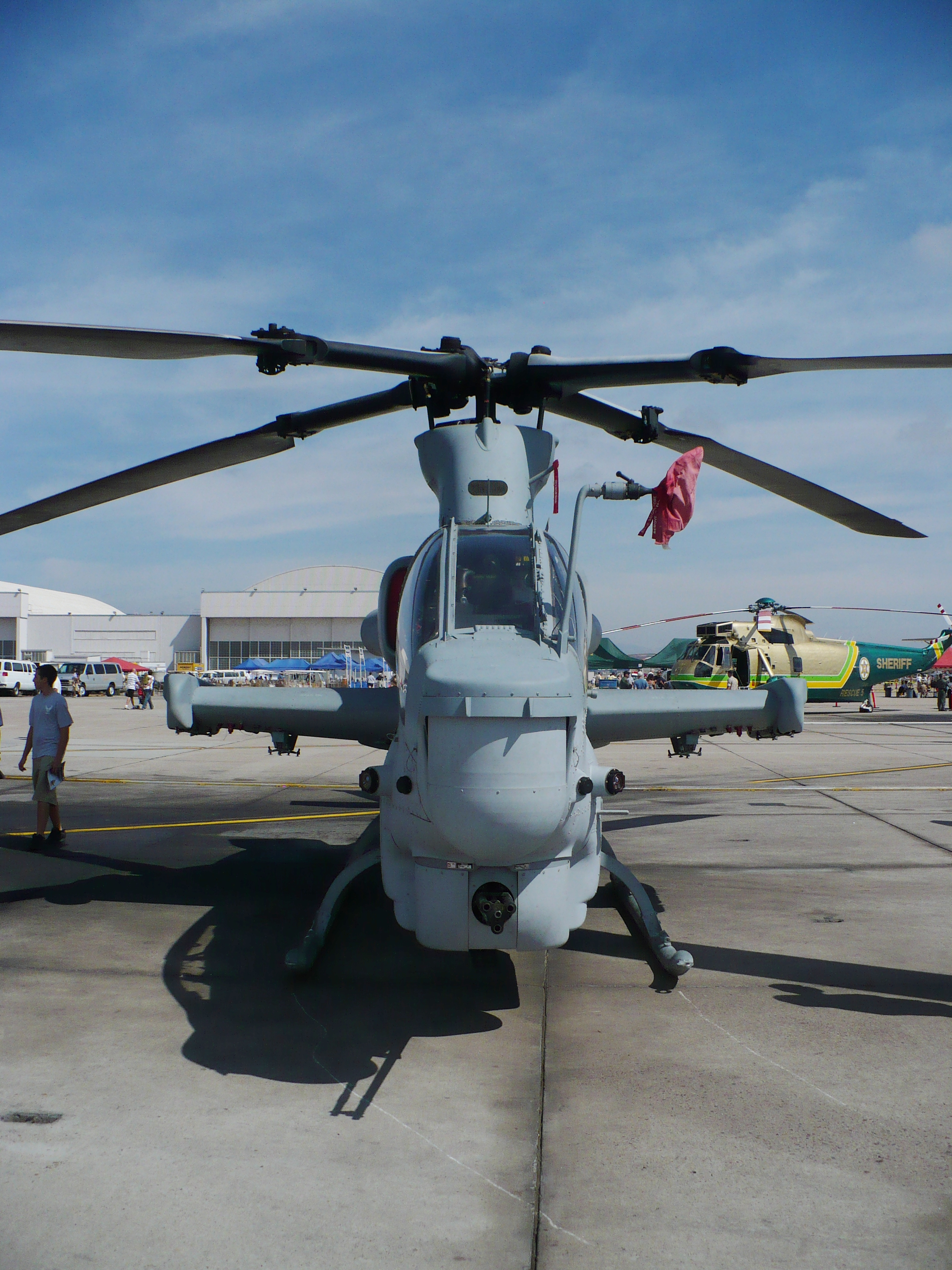
A front view of an AH-1Z at the MCAS Miramar Air Show

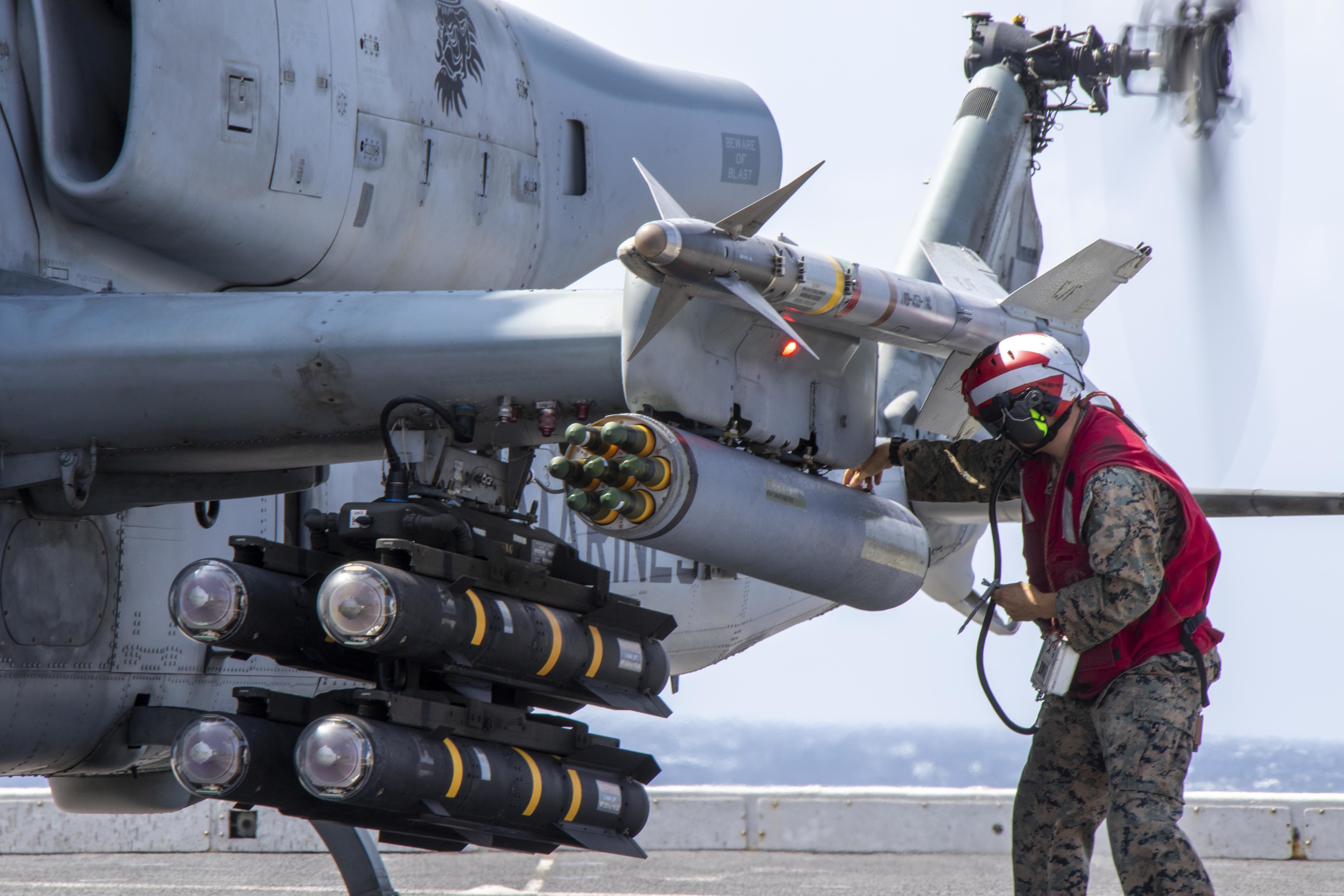
A AH-1Z Viper loaded with AGM-179 JAGM missiles, an AIM-9 Sidewinder, and Hydra 70 rockets

Data from Bell Specifications, The International Directory of Military Aircraft, 2002–2003, Modern Battlefield Warplanes

General characteristics

- Crew: Two: pilot and co-pilot/gunner (CPG)
- Length: 58 ft 3 in (17.75 m)
- Height: 14 ft 4 in (4.37 m)
- Empty weight: 12,300 lb (5,579 kg)
- Max takeoff weight: 18,500 lb (8,391 kg)
- Powerplant: 2 × General Electric T700-GE-401C turboshaft, 1,800 shp (1,300 kW) each
- Main rotor diameter: 48 ft (15 m)
- Main rotor area: 1,808 sq ft (168.0 m^{2}) 4-bladed main and tail rotors

Performance

- Cruise speed: 160 kn (180 mph, 300 km/h)
- Never exceed speed: 222 kn (255 mph, 411 km/h)
- Range: 370 nmi (430 mi, 690 km)
- Combat range: 125 nmi (144 mi, 232 km) with 2,500 lb (1,100 kg) payload
- Service ceiling: 20,000 ft (6,100 m) +
- Rate of climb: 2,790 ft/min (14.2 m/s)

Armament

- Guns:

- 1 × 20 mm (0.787 in) M197 three-barreled rotary cannon in the A/A49E-7 turret (750 round ammo capacity)

- Hardpoints: 6 total pylon stations on stub wings with a capacity of 5,764 lb (2,615 kg) maximum, with provisions to carry combinations of:
  - Rockets:
    - 2.75 in (70 mm) Hydra 70 (unguided) or APKWS II (guided) rockets (Mounted in LAU-68C/A (7 shot) or LAU-61D/A (19 shot) launchers; up to 76 unguided or 38 guided rockets total)
  - Missiles:
    - AIM-9 Sidewinder air-to-air missiles – one mounted on each wing tip station (two total)
    - AGM-114 Hellfire air-to-surface missiles – Up to 16 missiles mounted in four 4-round M299 missile launchers, two on each wing
    - AGM-179 JAGM air-to-surface missiles - Up to 8 missiles mounted (confirmed) in two 4-round missile launchers, one on each wing (16 is likely possible as JAGM uses Hellfire missile body)

== See also ==
- U.S. helicopter armament subsystems, AH-1

Related development

- Bell YAH-63
- IAIO Toufan
- Panha 2091

Aircraft of comparable role, configuration, and era

- AgustaWestland Apache
- Boeing AH-64E
- Changhe Z-10
- Harbin Z-21
- Leonardo Helicopters AW249 Fenice
- Mil Mi-28
- Kamov Ka-50/Ka-52

Related lists

- List of active United States military aircraft
- List of attack aircraft
- List of rotorcraft
