= Ireedui Gantogtokh =

Mongolian Entrepreneur (born 1995)

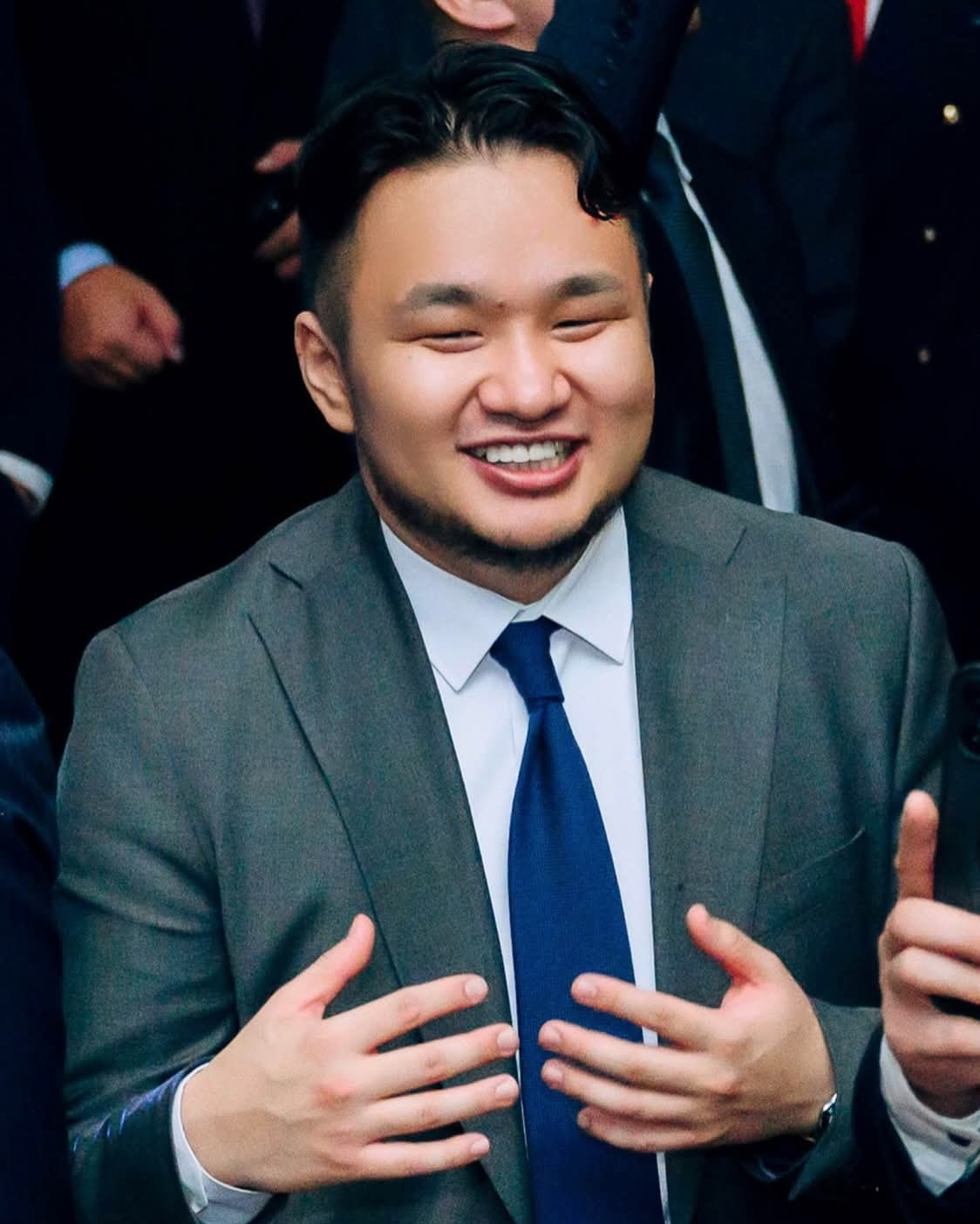
- Ireedui Gantogtokh in 2024
- Born: Ireedui Gantogtokh; March 20, 1995 (age 31); Ulaanbaatar, Mongolia
- Other name: Noyon IZ
- Education: Mongolian University of Science and Technology
- Occupations: YouTuber; Software Engineer; Entrepreneur
- Spouse: Munkhnaran Nisgegch
- Parents: Gantogtokh Damdinjav (father); Bayarmagnai Tseelkhajav (mother)

YouTube information
- Channel: Ireedui Gantogtokh
- Years active: 2016–present
- Genres: Gaming; comedy; reaction video; vlog
- Subscribers: 195 thousand
- Views: 11.9 million
- Last updated: 25 April 2026
- Website: ireedui.com

Ireedui Gantogtokh (Mongolian: Гантогтохын Ирээдүй, romanized: Gantogtokhiin Ireedui; born 20 March 1995) is a Mongolian entrepreneur, social activist and YouTuber. He gained popularity on his YouTube channel, which has close to 200,000 subscribers, before branching into entrepreneurship and social.

== Biography ==
Ireedui Gantogtokh was born on March 20, 1995, in Ulaanbaatar, Mongolia. His parents, Gantogtokh Damdinjav and Bayarmagnai Tseelkhajav, worked abroad, so he spent most of his early childhood with his grandmother. He earned his bachelor's degree in 2015.

Gantogtokh's YouTube channel had 12 million views and 180k subscribers as of 2021 IZ. His videos cover a wide range of topics including trends, tech, education, motivational vlogs, politics and other cultural content. IZ is also host of a Lifestyle Podcast named IZ’s Podcast Speaks. The first episode aired on Spotify and Apple Podcasts along with the video format on YouTube on January 5, 2020. Ireedui is the CEO and founder of Meborny LLC, a digital marketing firm that specializes in brand management, media outreach programs, media strategy development, social verification, and other marketing services.

Ireedui is married and has a son and daughter.

== Political career ==
In September 2024, Ireedui Gantogtokh was elected as a board member of the Social Democratic Youth of Mongolia (SDY Mongolia), the official youth wing of the Mongolian People's Party.

In November 2024, he was appointed as an advisor to Nyamosor Uchral, the Chief of the Cabinet Secretariat of Mongolia. In this role, he contributed to youth engagement policies, government PR strategies, and digital communication initiatives.

In June 2025, Uchral became the First Deputy Prime Minister and Minister of Economic Development. Ireedui continued serving as his senior advisor, now focusing on strategic communication for economic policy, international image-building, and coordinating cross-sector youth initiatives.

In February 2026, Ireedui Gantogtokh was reappointed as an advisor, this time to Nyamosor Uchral in his capacity as Speaker of the State Great Khural of Mongolia.
