= Bell AH-1 SuperCobra =

Series of twin-engine attack helicopters

AH-1 SeaCobra / SuperCobra
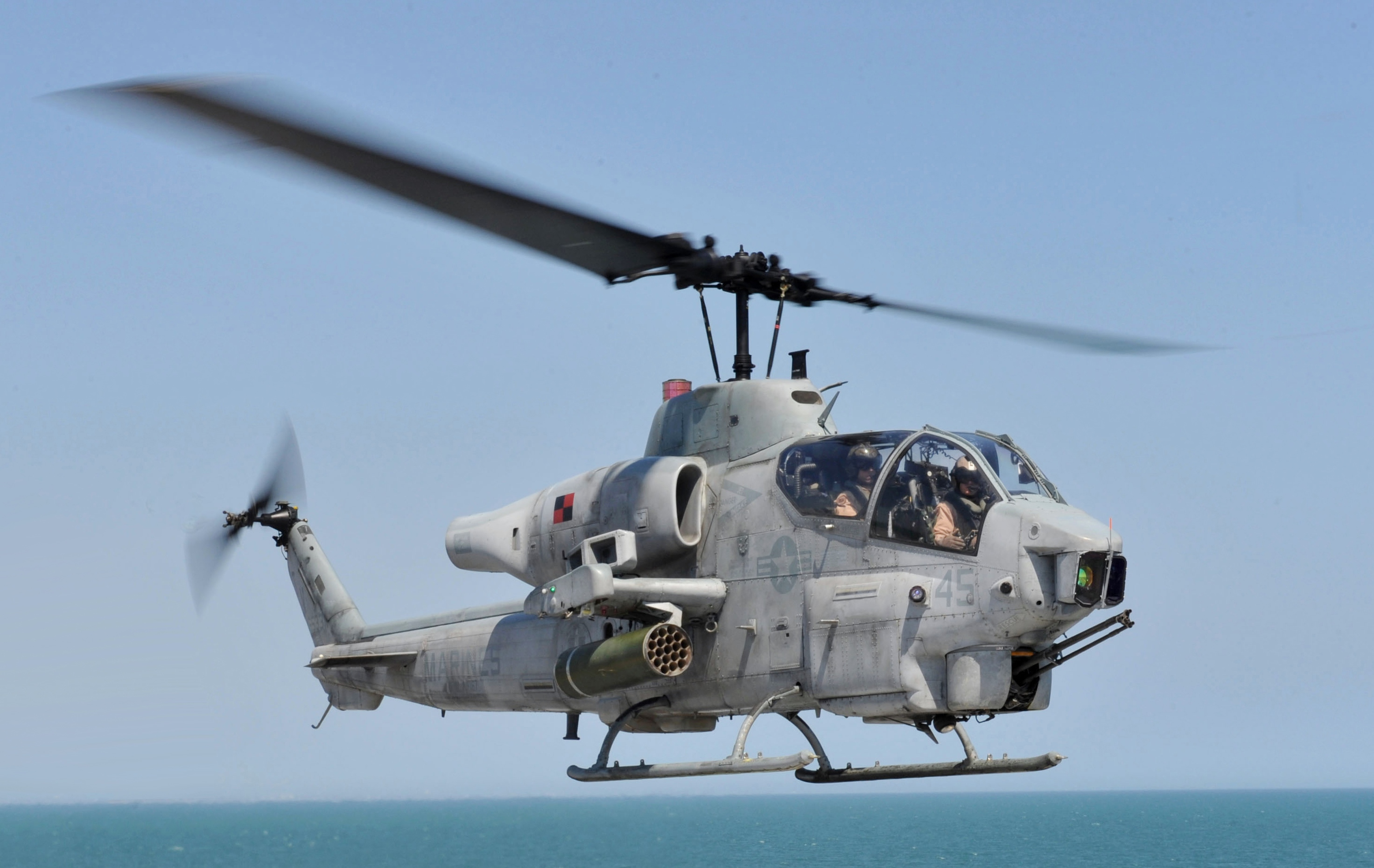
- A USMC AH-1W taking off from USS Bataan

General information
- Type: Attack helicopter
- National origin: United States
- Manufacturer: Bell Helicopter
- Status: in service
- Primary users: United States Marine Corps (former) Islamic Republic of Iran Army; Republic of China Army; Turkish Navy
- Number built: 1,271+

History
- Manufactured: 1970–1980s
- Introduction date: 1971 (AH-1J), 1986 (AH-1W)
- First flight: 1969 (AH-1J)
- Retired: 2020 (USMC)
- Developed from: Bell AH-1 Cobra
- Variants: Bell AH-1Z Viper; Panha 2091; IAIO Toufan

The Bell AH-1 SuperCobra is a twin-engined attack helicopter that was developed on behalf of, and primarily operated by, the United States Marine Corps (USMC). The twin Cobra family, itself part of the larger Huey family, includes the AH-1J SeaCobra, the AH-1T Improved SeaCobra, and the AH-1W SuperCobra.

The Super Cobra was derived from the single-engined AH-1 Cobra, which had been developed during the mid-1960s as an interim gunship for the U.S. Army. The USMC had quickly taken an interest in the type, but sought a twin-engined arrangement for greater operational safety at sea, along with more capable armaments. While initially opposed by the Department of Defense, who were keen to promote commonality across the services, in May 1968, an order for an initial 49 twin-engine AH-1J SeaCobras was issued to Bell. The type entered service during the final months of the US's involvement in the Vietnam War, seeing limited action in the theatre as a result.

The USMC promptly sought greater payload capacity than that provided by the original Sea Cobra; thus the AH-1T, equipped with the dynamic systems of the Model 309 and a lengthened fuselage, was produced by Bell during the 1970s. In the following decade, in response to the denial of funding to procure the Boeing AH-64 Apache attack helicopter, the USMC opted to procure a more capable variant of the AH-1T; equipped with revised fire control systems compatible with new munitions, such as the AGM-114 Hellfire anti-tank missile. The new model, designated AH-1W, commenced delivery in 1986. Seeking to further develop the type, Bell opted to develop the extensively redesigned and modernised Bell AH-1Z Viper during the 1990s and 2000s.

The Sea Cobra was involved in multiple major operations during the latter half of the twentieth century, such as during the United States invasion of Grenada in 1983. During the Iran–Iraq War of the 1980s, Iranian Sea Cobras were intensely used, proving itself to be capable in both anti-armor and anti-aircraft warfare. Turkey, who operated numerous Cobras and Super Cobras, used the type on multiple occasions against Kurdistan Workers' Party (PKK) insurgents. On numerous occasions in the 1990s, USMC AH-1s were deployed during the Gulf War of the early 1990s, as well as for the United States invasion of Haiti in 1994, and the US intervention in the Yugoslav Wars in the late 1990s. In the twenty-first century, the type also saw action in the multi-decade War in Afghanistan, and the 2003 invasion of Iraq. During October 2020, the USMC withdrew the last of its AH-1Ws in favor of exclusively operating the AH-1Z.

== Design and development ==
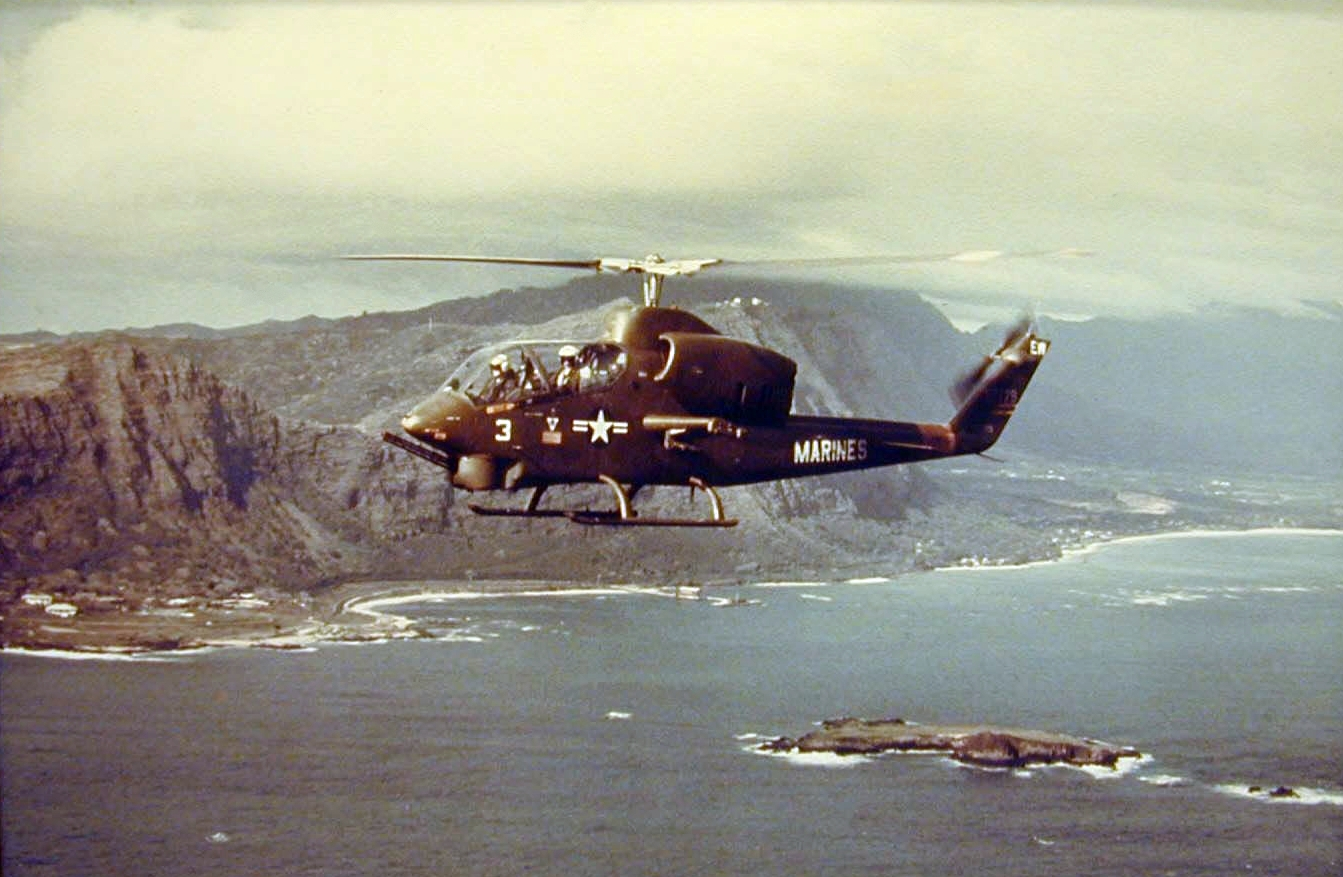
AH-1J SeaCobra flying off Hawaii, circa 1971

The AH-1 Cobra was developed in the mid-1960s as an interim gunship for the U.S. Army for use during the Vietnam War. The Cobra shared the proven transmission, rotor system, and the Lycoming T53 turboshaft engine of the prolific UH-1 "Huey" utility helicopter. By June 1967, the first AH-1G HueyCobras had been delivered. Between 1967 and 1973, Bell manufactured 1,116 AH-1Gs for the U.S. Army; these Cobras chalked up in excess of one million operational hours in the Vietnam theatre.

The U.S. Marine Corps became particularly interested in the AH-1G Cobra, but expressed its preference for a twin-engined configuration that would provide improved safety in over-water operations. Furthermore, the service also sought a more potent turret-mounted weapon. Initially, the Department of Defense had balked at providing the Marines with a twin-engine version of the Cobra in the belief that commonality with the Army's AH-1Gs outweighed the advantages of a different engine arrangement. However, the Marines won out; thus, during May 1968, Bell received a contract for 49 twin-engine AH-1J SeaCobras. The AH-1J was also equipped with a more powerful gun turret in the form of the three-barrel 20 mm XM197 cannon, which was based on the six-barrel M61 Vulcan cannon. As an interim measure, the U.S. Army transferred 38 AH-1Gs to the Marines in 1969.

During the 1970s, the Marine Corps requested greater load carrying capability in high temperatures for the Cobra. Bell used systems from its Model 309 to develop a new model, the AH-1T, that was provisioned with a lengthened tailboom and fuselage as well as the upgraded transmission and engines from the Model 309. Bell designed the AH-1T to be more reliable and easier to maintain in the field. The version was given full TOW missile capability with targeting system and other sensors. An advanced version, known as the AH-1T+, that was equipped with more powerful T700-GE-700 engines and advanced avionics, was proposed to Iran in the late 1970s, but the overthrow of the Shah of Iran in the late 1970s resulted in the sale being canceled.

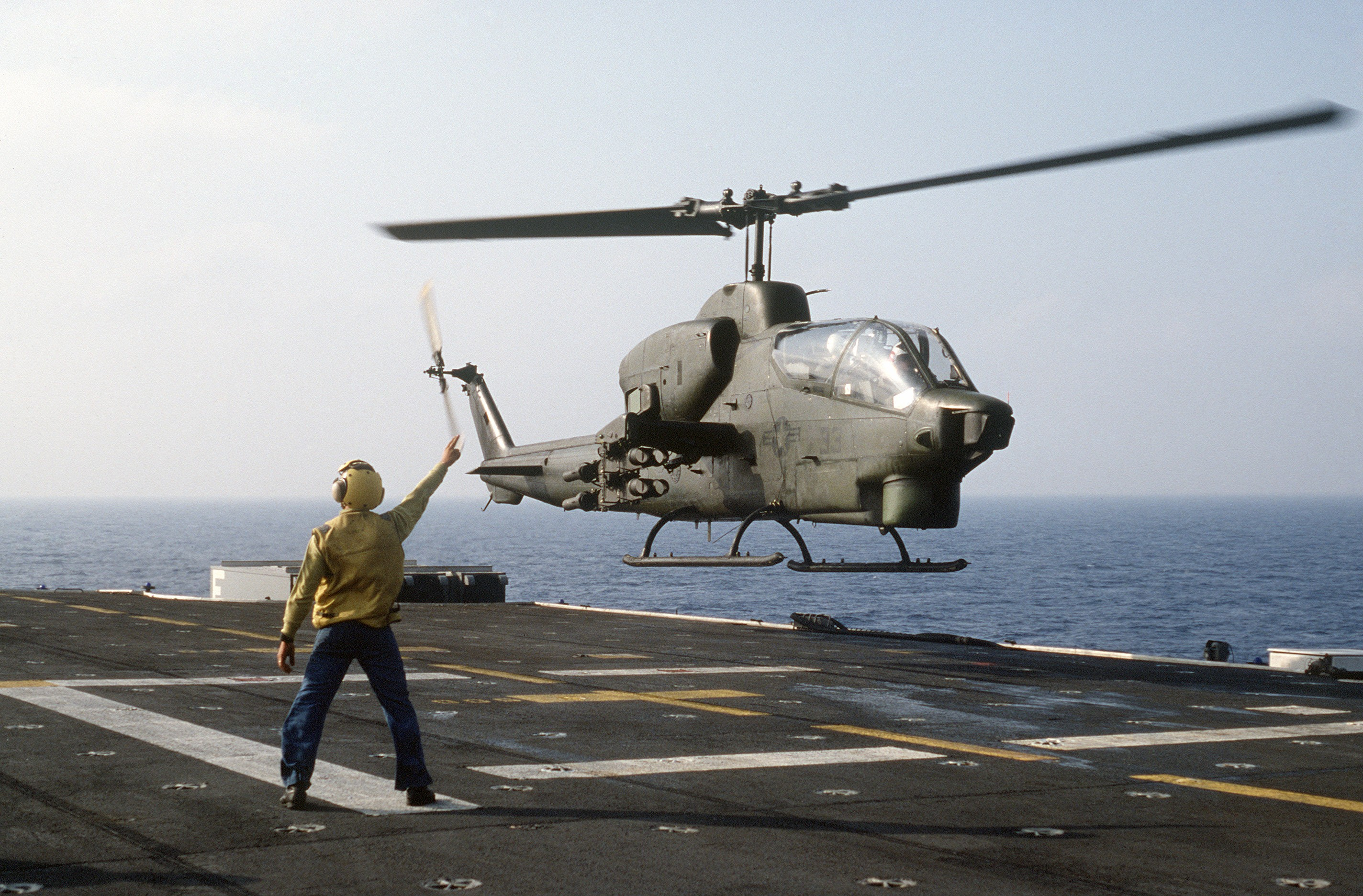
An AH-1T Sea Cobra being launched from the amphibious assault ship Iwo Jima, July 1985.

In the early 1980s, the Marine Corps sought a new navalized helicopter; accordingly, it evaluated the Boeing AH-64 Apache attack helicopter over a two-week period in September 1981, which included shipboard operation tests. Furthermore, various concepts were studied at this time. However, the service's request for funding to purchase the AH-64 was denied by Congress that same year. As an alternative option, the Marines procured a more powerful version of the AH-1T. Other changes included modified fire control systems to carry and fire AIM-9 Sidewinder and AGM-114 Hellfire missiles. The new version, which was funded by Congress, received the AH-1W designation. During March 1986, deliveries of the AH-1W SuperCobra commenced, eventually totaling 179 new-built helicopters along with the upgrading of 43 existing AH-1Ts.

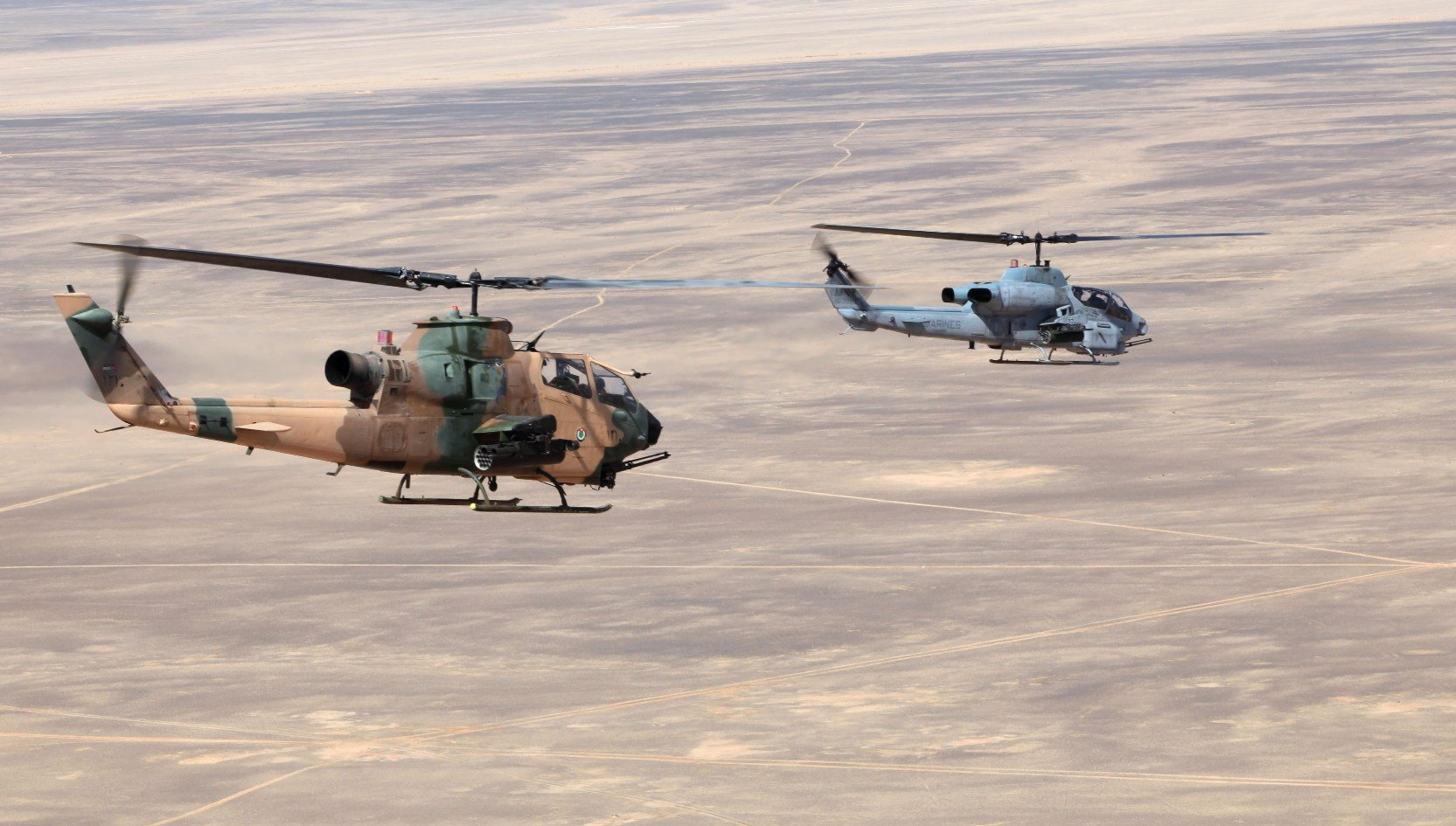
On the right an AH-1W showing its twin exhaust, compared to the single on the AH-1F (left)

During the late 1990s, Bell was negotiating to acquire the Romanian state-managed helicopter manufacturer IAR Brașov with the intention of establishing an overseas production line for the AH-1W for multiple export customers. In May 1997, the company signed an agreement with the Romanian State Ownership Fund to buy the government's 70 percent stake in IAR Brașov. However, during November 1999, following protracted negotiations, Bell announced that it had abandoned its acquisition efforts, and thus the overseas production initiative, after the Romanian government had allegedly ceased responding to its proposals.

The AH-1T+ demonstrator and AH-1W prototype were later tested with a new experimental composite four-blade main rotor system. The new configuration offered better performance, reduced noise, and improved battle damage tolerance. Lacking a USMC contract, Bell developed this new design into the AH-1Z with its own funds. By 1996, the Marines were again prevented from ordering the AH-64. Developing a Marine version of the Apache would have been expensive and it was likely that the Marine Corps would be its only customer. Instead, the service signed a contract for the upgrading of AH-1Ws into AH-1Zs.

The Bell AH-1Z Viper retained much of the AH-1W's design, but also features several major changes. The AH-1Z's two redesigned wing stubs are longer with each adding a wingtip station for a missile such as the AIM-9 Sidewinder. Each wing has two other stations for 70 mm (2.75 in) Hydra rocket pods, or AGM-114 Hellfire quad missile launcher. The AN/APG-78 Longbow radar can be mounted on a wingtip station. During October 2020, the last AH-1Ws were phased out of service with the Marine Corps in favor of the AH-1Z.

== Operational history ==
=== United States ===
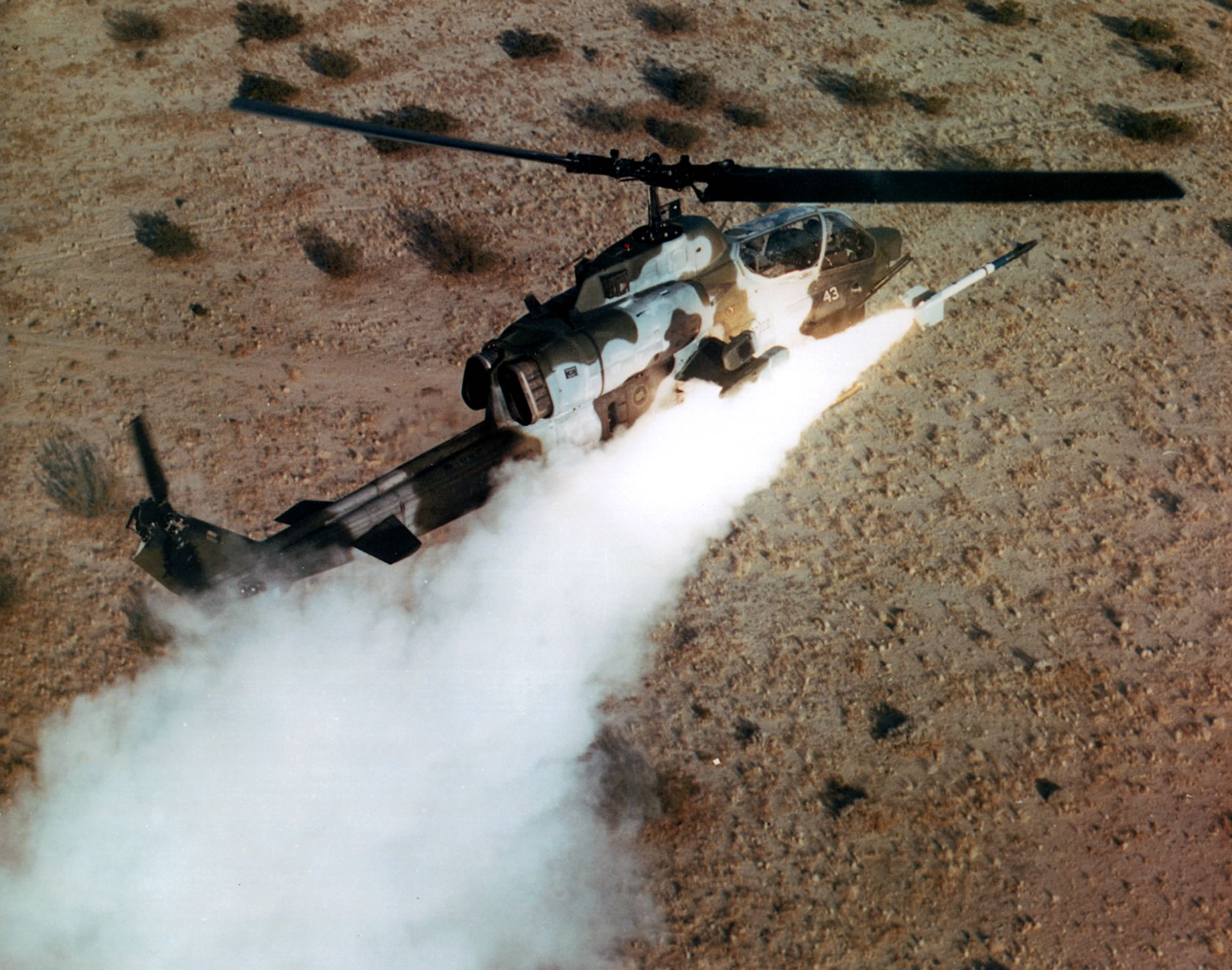
AH-1W launches a Sidewinder missile, 1987

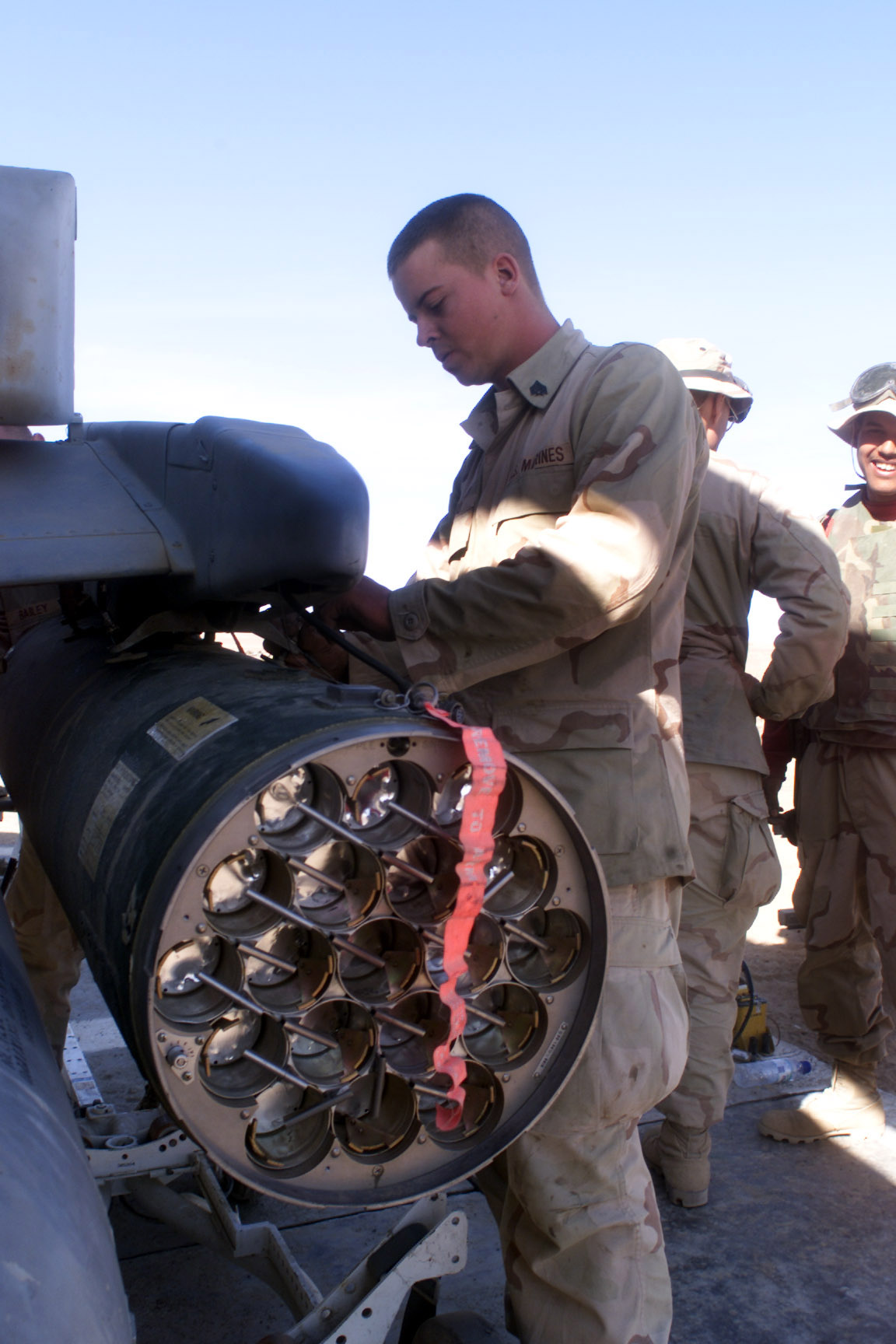
A rocket pod being loaded on an AH-1W's stub wing

During the closing months of the United States' involvement in the Vietnam War, the Marine Corps embarked the AH-1J SeaCobra assigned to HMA-369 (now HMLA-369) aboard Denver, Cleveland, and later Dubuque, for sea-based interdiction of the Ho Chi Minh Trail in North Vietnam in the vicinity of Hon La (Tiger) Island. These were termed Marine Hunter-Killer (MARHUK) Operations and lasted from June to December 1972. As such, the type participated in the final American combat operations in Vietnam. Several AH-1Js were present to cover the evacuation of the US Embassy in Saigon in April 1975. During the Vietnam War, 306 AH-1 were destroyed.

During 1983, Marine Cobras took part in the invasion of Grenada. They were typically used to perform close air support and helicopter escort missions; a total of two AH-1Ts were shot down and three crew members killed. That same year, Marine AH-1s were also deployed off the coast of Beirut, Lebanon, amid the Lebanese Civil War in support of the Multinational Peacekeeping Force. In this theatre, the AH-1s were typically armed with Sidewinder missiles and guns, which were intended to be used as an emergency air defense measure to counter the threat of light civil aircraft being piloted by suicide bombers.

During the mid-1980s, the AH-1W variant entered service with the USMC. Between 1986 to 1999, the service took delivery of 179 Super Cobras.

In the late 1980s, in response to the Tanker War of the wider Iran–Iraq War, USMC Cobras were dispatched for Operation Earnest Will in the Persian Gulf to escort shipping and deter attacks upon them. It was during these missions that Cobras sank three Iranian patrol boats while losing a single AH-1T to Iranian anti-aircraft fire. USMC Cobras from Saipan flew "top cover" during an evacuation of U.S. and other foreign citizens from Liberia in 1990.

During the Gulf War, 78 Marine SuperCobras were deployed, flying a total of 1,273 sorties in Iraq. While no combat losses were reportedly incurred, three AH-1s were lost to accidents either during or after the combat operations. The AH-1W units were credited with destroying 97 tanks, 104 armored personnel carriers and vehicles, and two anti-aircraft artillery sites during the 100-hour ground campaign.

USMC Cobras were also used in various other operations throughout the 1990s. The type provided support for the U.S. humanitarian intervention in Somalia, Operation Restore Hope, during 1992–1993, where they were used during the Bloody Monday raid on 12 July 1993. They were also employed during the U.S. invasion of Haiti during 1994. USMC Cobras were used in U.S. military interventions in the former Yugoslavia in the 1990s; specifically, two AH-1Ws assisted in the rescue of USAF Captain Scott O'Grady, after his F-16 was shot down by a SAM in June 1995.

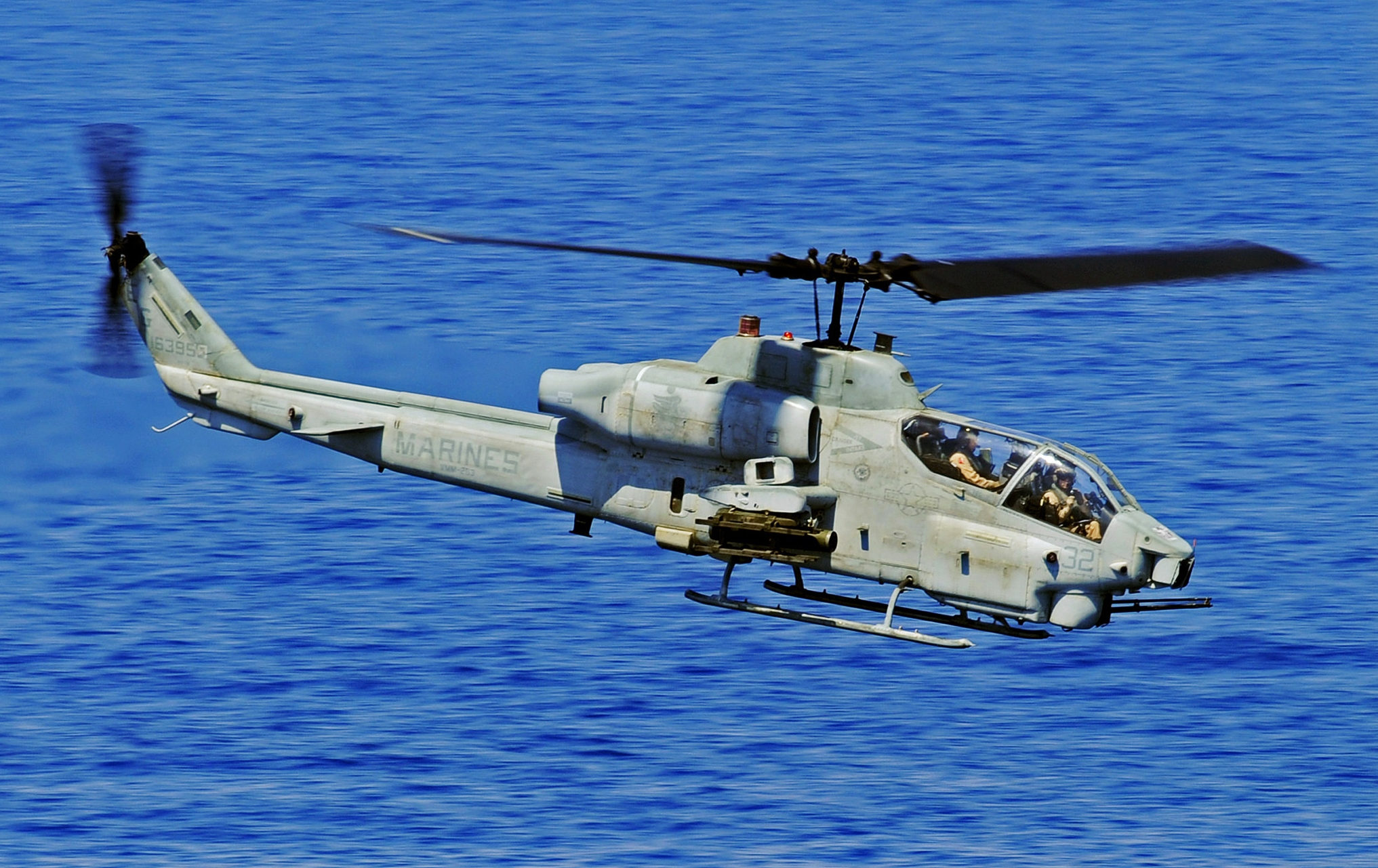
A Super Cobra flies past USS Fort McHenry during a Search and Seizure (VBSS) drill in 2009.

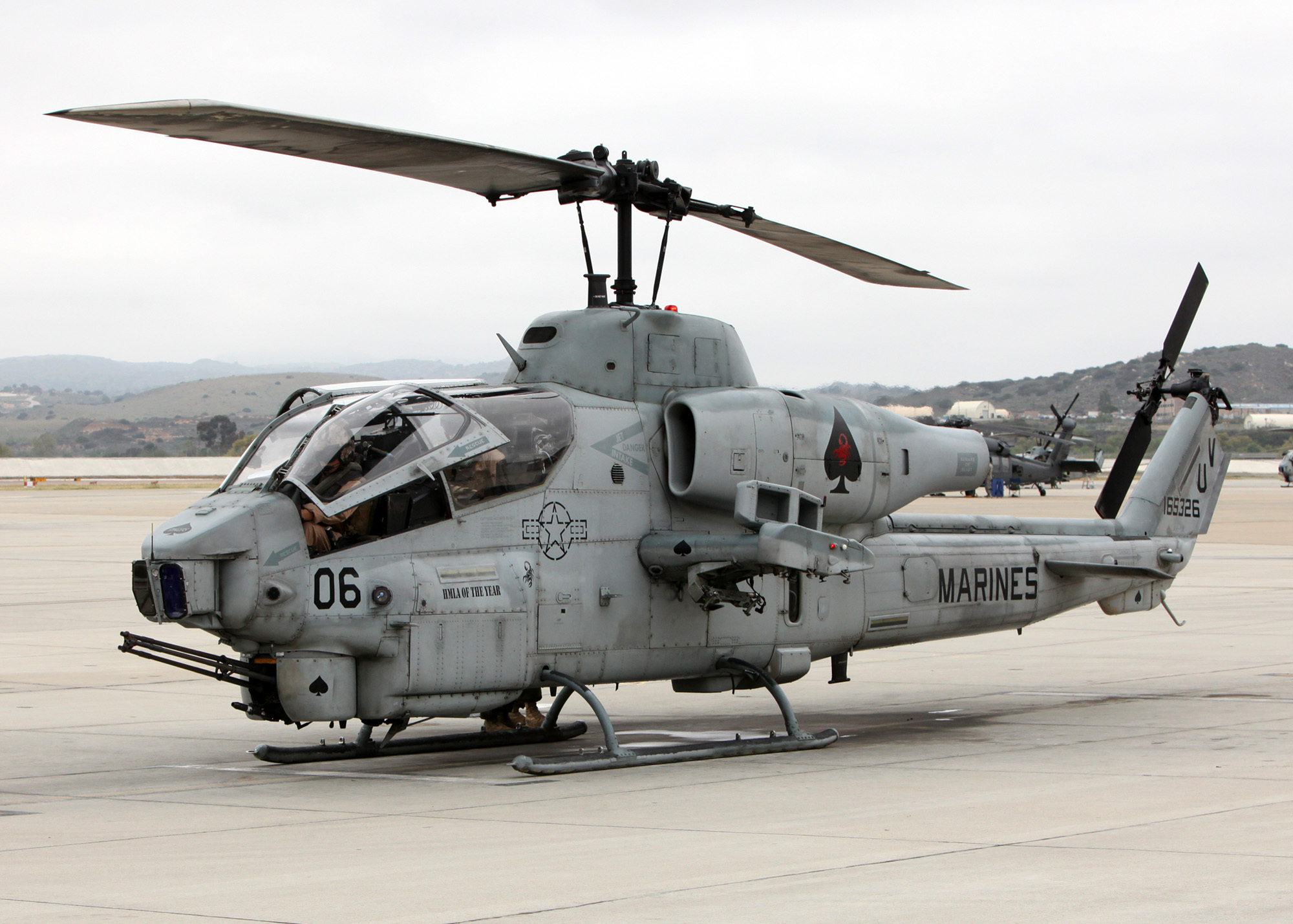
An AH-1W before its final flight prior to retirement

During the twenty-first century, USMC Cobras participated in Operation Enduring Freedom in Afghanistan and in Operation Iraqi Freedom in the conflict in Iraq. While new replacement aircraft were considered as an alternative to major upgrades of the AH-1 fleet, Marine Corps studies showed that an upgrade was the most affordable, most supportable and most effective solution for the Marine Corps light attack helicopter mission.

During the opening phase of the 2003 invasion of Iraq, SuperCobras were deployed on the front lines, often flying in hunter-killer teams with Bell UH-1 Iroquois utility helicopters and other coalition aircraft. Reportedly, 46 of the 58 USMC AH-1s deployed sustained battle damage, which was mostly from infantry-type weapons. AH-1Ws were involved in the rescue of Private First Class Jessica Lynch from an Iraqi hospital.

In late August 2016, Marine AH-1W Cobras flying from USS Wasp started flying combat missions over Sirte, Libya against the Islamic State of Iraq and the Levant in Libya, providing close air support for friendly militias on the ground. In the later stages of the operation, AH-1Ws flew combat missions from the deck of USS San Antonio after that ship replaced Wasp in October 2016.

In October 2020, the U.S. Marine Corps retired the last of its AH-1Ws after 34 years of service, having replacing the type with the Bell AH-1Z Viper. By the time of their retirement, the model had collectively accumulated 933,614 flight hours.

=== Iran ===
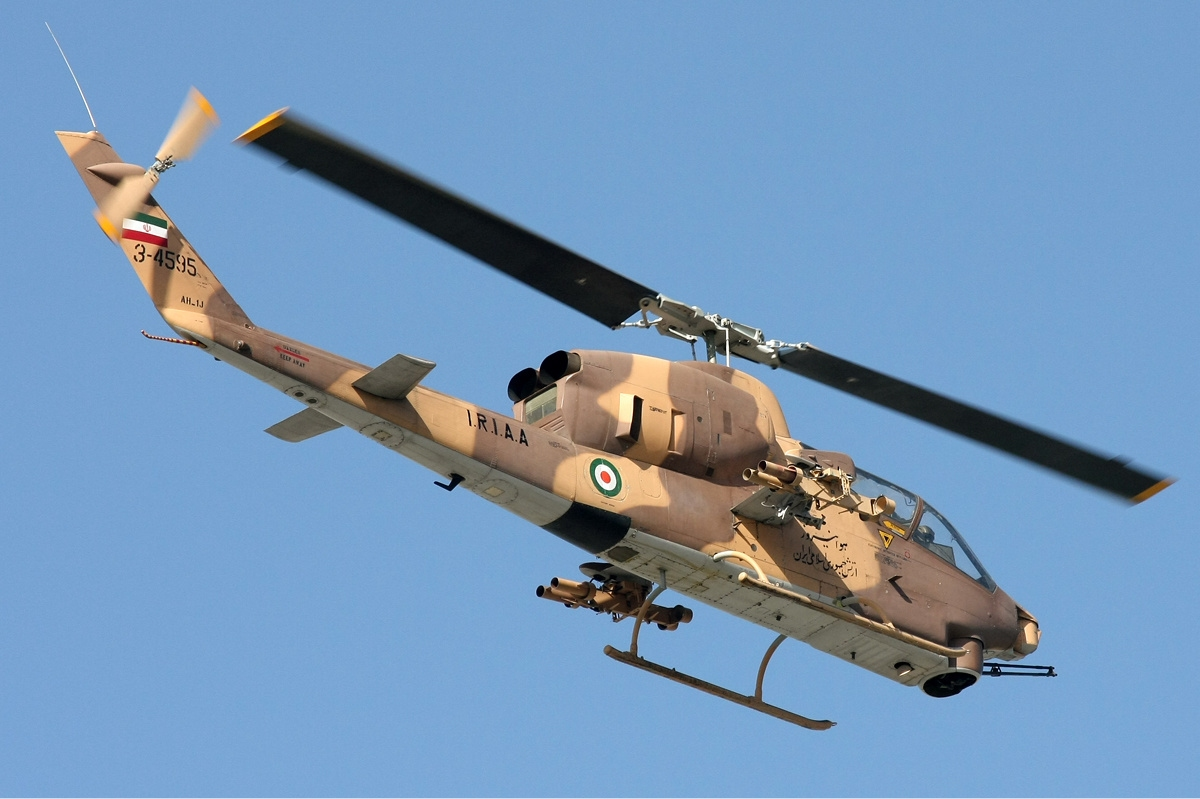
Iran Army Aviation AH-1J Cobra

In 1971, Iran purchased 202 examples of an improved AH-1J, named "AH-1J International", from the United States. This model featured improvements such as the uprated P&WC T400-WV-402 engine and a strengthened drivetrain. Furthermore, recoil damping gear was fitted to the 20 mm M197 gun turret, while the gunner was provided with a stabilized sight along with a stabilized seat. Of the AH-1Js operated by the Imperial Iranian Army Aviation, 62 were capable of using the TOW missile.

Iranian AH-1Js participated in the Iran–Iraq War—which saw the most intensive use of helicopters in any conventional war. Iranian AH-1Js (particularly the TOW-capable ones) were "exceptionally effective" in anti-armor warfare, inflicting heavy losses on Iraqi armored and vehicle formations. In operations over the barren terrain in Khuzestan and later in southern Iraq, beside the standard tactics, Iranian pilots developed special, effective tactics, often in the same manner as the Soviets did with their Mi-24s. Due to the post-Revolution weapons sanctions, Iranians had to make do with what was at hand: they equipped the AH-1Js with AGM-65 Maverick missiles and used them with some success in several operations.

Starting from October 1980, the AH-1Js engaged in air-to-air combat with Iraqi Mil Mi-24 helicopters on several, separate occasions during the Iran–Iraq War. The results of these engagements are disputed. One document cited that Iranian AH-1Js took on Iraqi Mi-8 and Mi-24 helicopters. Sources report that the Iranian AH-1 pilots achieved a 10:1 kill ratio over the Iraqi helicopter pilots during these engagements (1:5). Additionally, one source states that ten Iranian AH-1Js were lost in the war, compared to six Iraqi Mi-24s lost. The skirmishes are described as fairly evenly matched in another source. The Mi-24 was faster and more powerful, but the AH-1J was more agile. There were even engagements between Iranian AH-1Js and Iraqi fixed-wing aircraft. The AH-1Js scored three confirmed kills against MiG-21s, claimed a Su-20, and shared in the destruction of a MiG-23—all using their 20 mm M197 cannon.

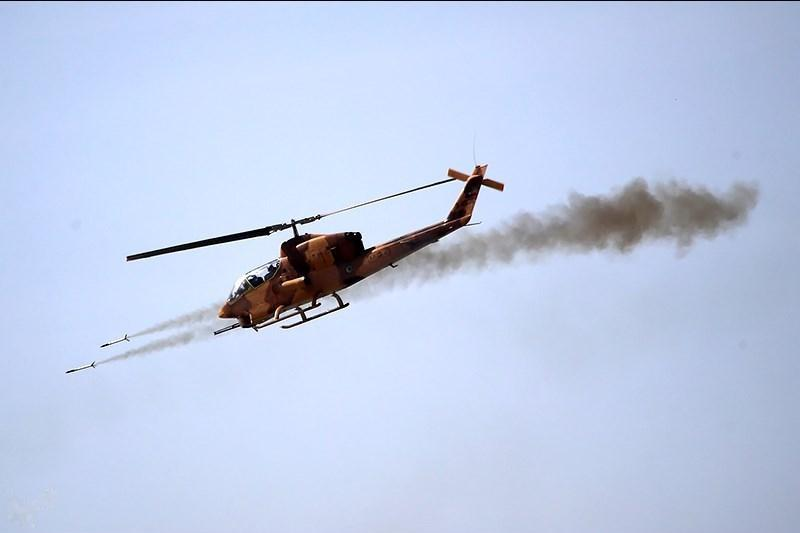
Iranian AH-1J during a live fire exercise, 2016

During early 1984, an Iranian AH-1J Sea Cobra was shot down by an Iraqi Pilatus PC-7 during Operation Kheibar (Iranian pilots Reza Moghadam and Mohammad Yazdi were rescued). About half of the AH-1Js were lost during the conflict to combat, accidents, and simple wear and tear. Ali Akbar Shiroodi and Ahmad Keshvari were two distinguished Iranian Cobra pilots during Iran-Iraq War and are considered wartime heroes in Iran. During 1988, two Soviet MiG-23s shot down a pair of Iranian AH-1Js that had strayed into western Afghan airspace.

Into the twenty-first century, Iranian AH-1Js remain in service with the Islamic Republic of Iran Army Aviation and have undergone indigenous upgrade programs. In 2010, Iran has unveiled its own AH-1J variants called Toufan I. In 2013, another improved variant called Toufan II was unveiled.

By the 2020s, there was an increasing expectation that, amid a combination of factors such as accumulated fatigue, increasingly outdated capabilities, and a shortage of spare components, Iran will probably seek to replace its AH-1Js before too long, possibly with Russian-sourced Mi-24s.

On 18 June 2025, during the Twelve-Day War, the Israel Defense Forces (IDF) stated that it destroyed eight AH-1s at a military airbase in Kermanshah.

=== Taiwan ===
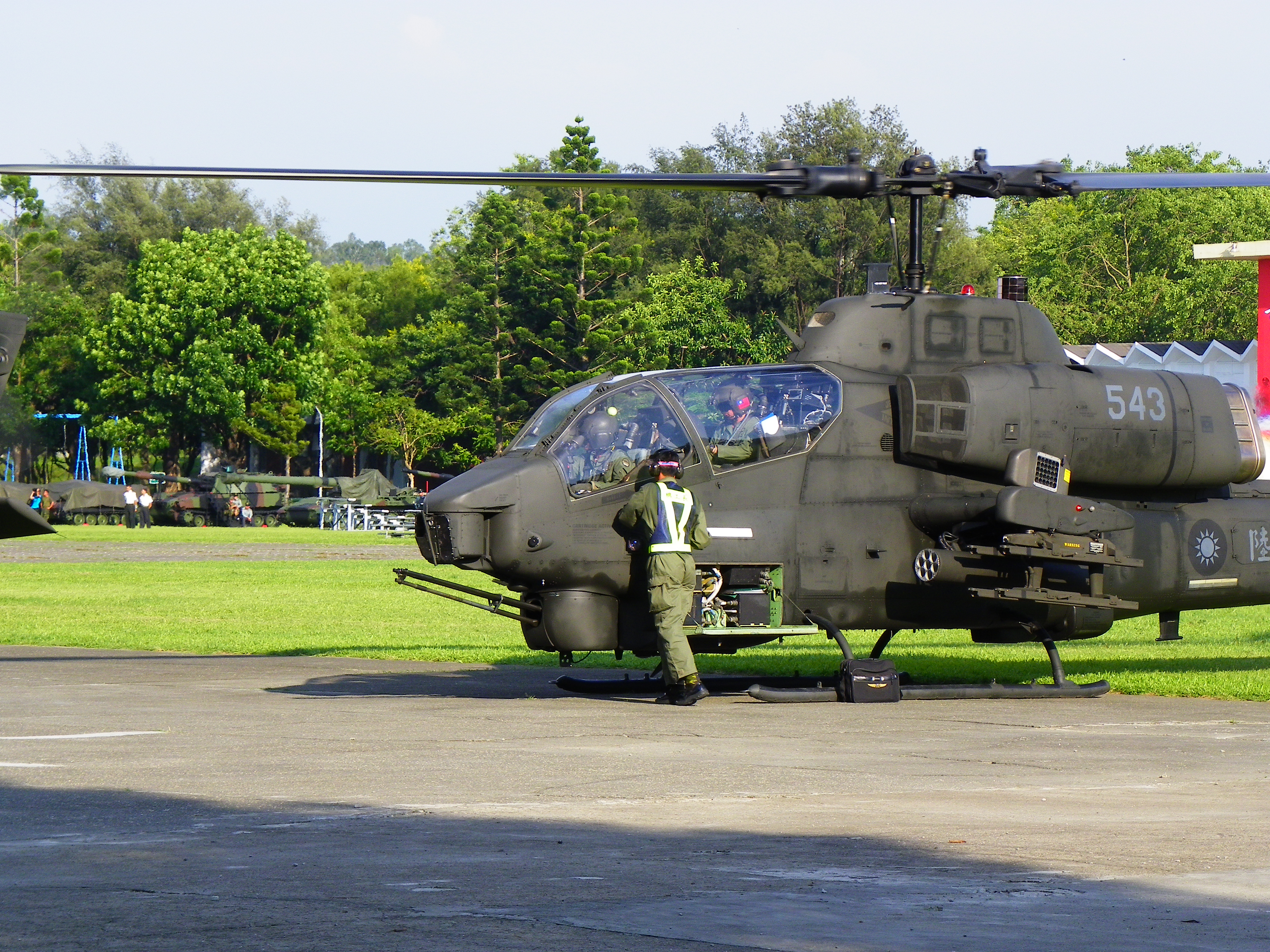
ROCA crew talking with pilot of AH-1W 543 while helicopter warms up

During 1984, Taiwan announced its requirement for attack helicopters; it subsequently evaluated the MBB Bo 105 and MD 500 helicopters. The requirement resulted in an order for 42 AH-1W SuperCobras being placed during 1992. Deliveries of this batch ran from 1993 to 1997. During 1997, it was announced that an additional 21 AH-1Ws had been ordered. The Ministry of National Defense assigned the helicopters to the ROC Army Aviation Training Centre and a pair of Army Aviation attack helicopter brigades. During the 2010s, Taiwan began supplementing its SuperCobras with 30 newly purchased AH-64Es. Into the 2020s, Taiwan continues to operate its SuperCobras; during January 2021, a NT$339.24 million (US$11.91 million) contract with the US was signed for the provision of technical support and spare parts the AH-1W fleet through to September 2027.

=== Turkey ===
During the early 1990s, Turkey bought ten AH-1W SuperCobras; these were supplemented by 32 ex-US Army AH-1 Cobras. The sale was politically controversial in the United States; in April 1996, the purchase of ten additional AH-1Ws by Turkey was blocked by the Clinton administration. During late 2011, Turkey requested the purchase of three AH-1Ws from the USMC inventory.

The AH-1s have been repeatedly used in combat against Kurdistan Workers' Party (PKK) insurgents. On 13 May 2016, PKK militants shot down a Turkish Army AH-1W SuperCobra using a 9K38 Igla (SA-18 Grouse) MANPADS; in the published video, the missile severed the tail section from the rest of the helicopter, causing it to spin, fragment in midair and crash, killing the two pilots on board. The Turkish government initially stated that it had descended due to technical failure, though it later became clear that the helicopter had been shot down. Amid the 2016 Turkish coup d'état attempt, Turkish Cobras were alleged to have fired upon several police vehicles.

During April 2022, all of the Turkish Army's remaining AH-1Ws were transferred to the Turkish Navy; they are the first type of attack helicopter to be operated by the service. Being already appropriately suited to maritime operations, the AH-1Ws are to be used on board the TCG Anadolu amphibious assault ship; as such, the type has been speculated to have displaced a planned navalised version of the indigenously built TAI/AgustaWestland T129 ATAK attack helicopter.

== Variants ==
=== Single-engine ===
For AH-1G, AH-1Q through AH-1S/P/E/F and other single-engine variants, see Bell AH-1 Cobra.

=== Twin-engine ===
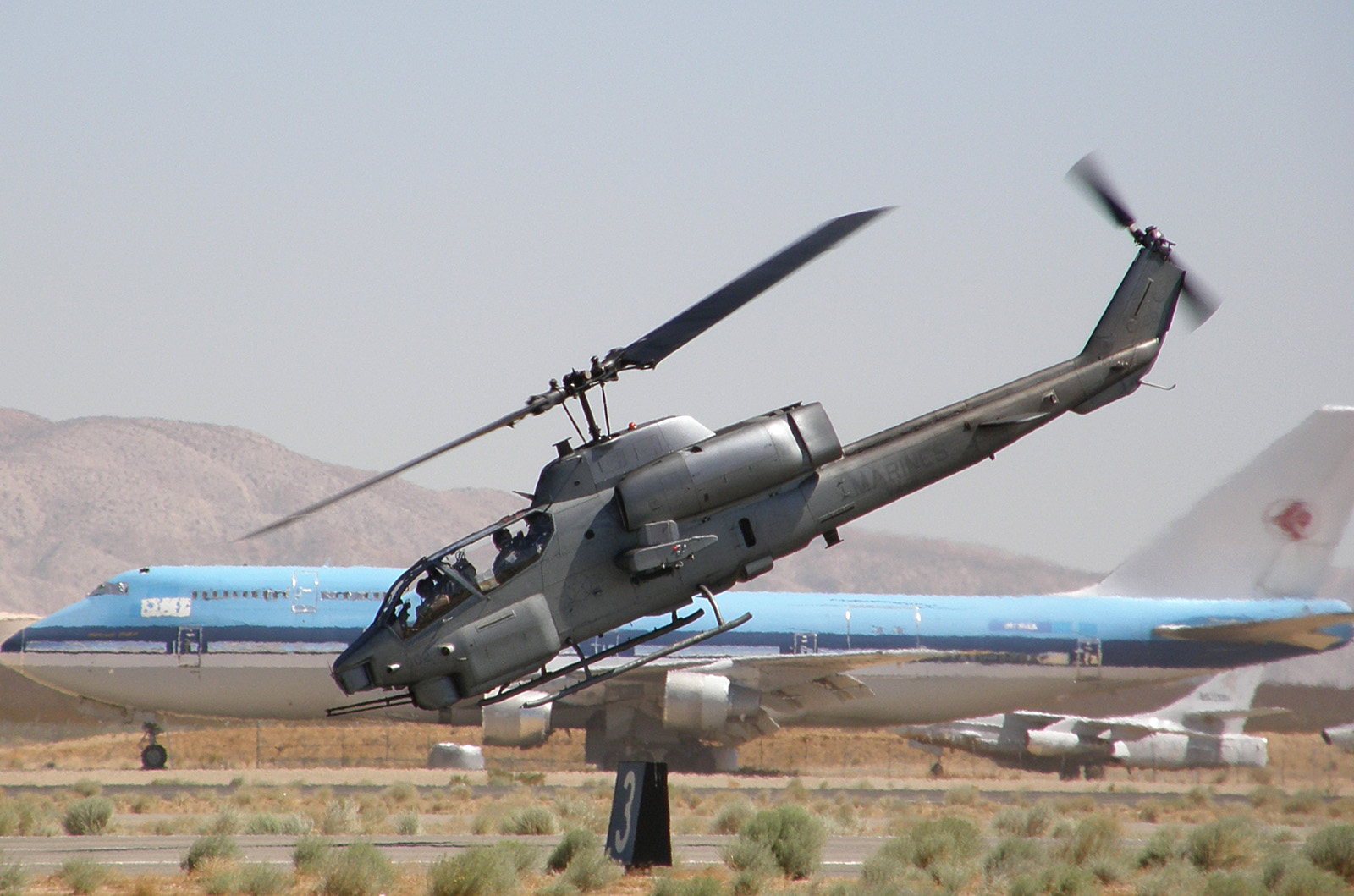
AH-1W on a training mission at the Mojave Spaceport

AH-1J SeaCobra
Original twin engine version.
AH-1J International
Export version of the AH-1J SeaCobra.
AH-1T Improved SeaCobra
Improved version with extended tailboom and fuselage and an upgraded transmission and engines.
AH-1W SuperCobra
("Whiskey Cobra"), day/night version with more powerful engines and advanced weapons capability.
AH-1(4B)W Viper
"Four-Bladed Whiskey" test version with a four-bladed bearingless composite main rotor based on Bell 680 rotor. A prototype was converted from AH-1T 161022.

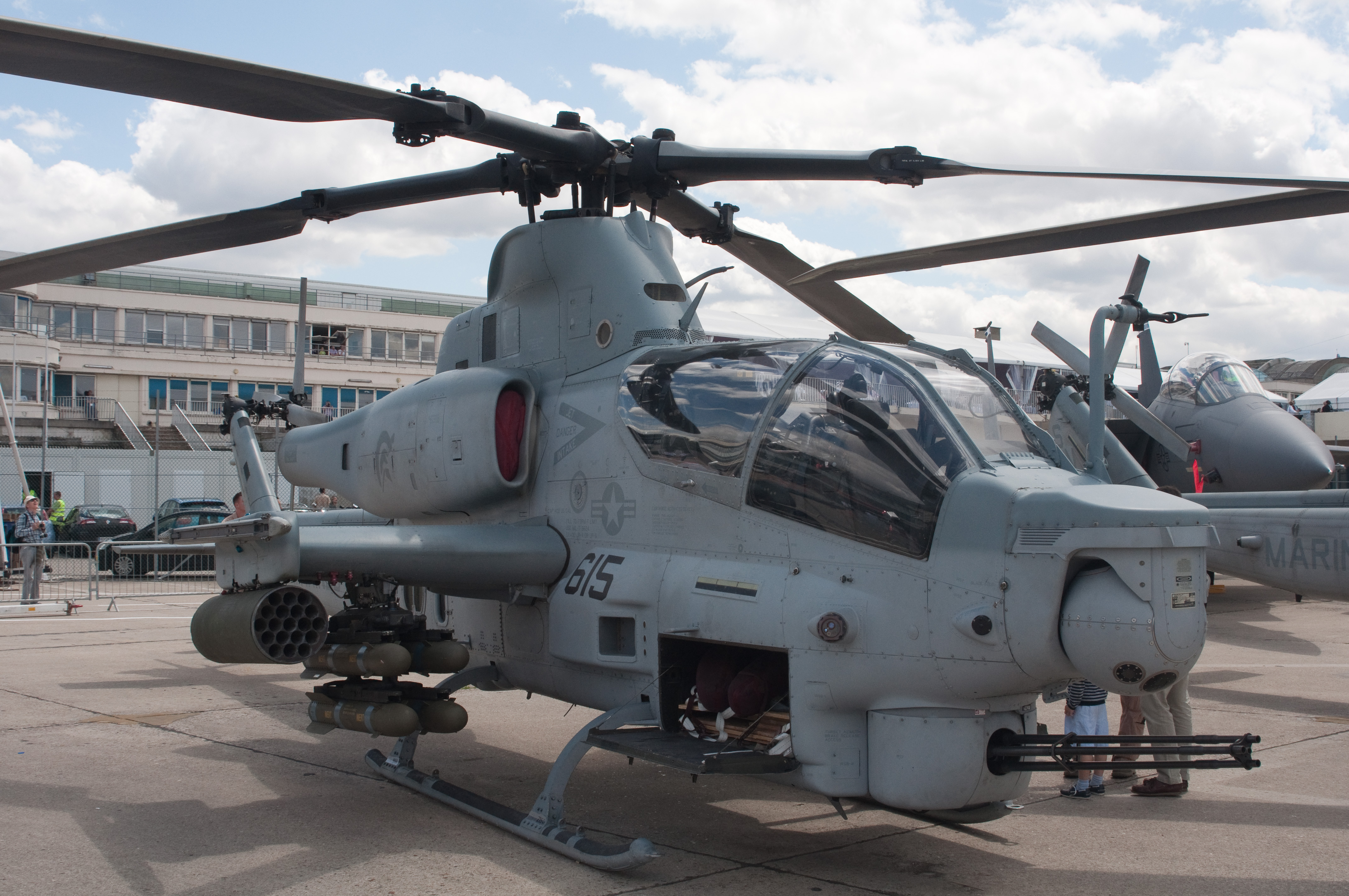
AH-1Z Viper at the 2011 Paris Air Show, with its 4-blade main rotor and longer engine exhaust ducts

AH-1Z Viper
A new variant nicknamed "Zulu Cobra", and developed in conjunction with the UH-1Y Venom for the H-1 upgrade program. The variant includes an upgraded four-blade main rotor and adds the Target Sight System (TSS).

Bell 309 KingCobra
Experimental all-weather version based on the AH-1G single-engine and AH-1J twin-engine designs. Two Bell 309s were produced; the first was powered by a PW&C T400-CP-400 Twin-Pac engine set and the second was powered by a Lycoming T-55-L-7C engine.
CobraVenom
Proposed version for the United Kingdom.
AH-1RO Dracula
Proposed version for Romania.
AH-1Z King Cobra
AH-1Z offered for Turkey's ATAK program; selected for production in 2000, but later canceled when Bell and Turkey could not reach an agreement on production.
Panha 2091
Unlicensed Iranian upgrade of AH-1J International.
IAIO Toufan
Iranian copy / re-manufactured AH-1J International by Iran Aviation Industries Organization, with locally sourced avionics, and weapons.

== Operators ==
=== Current ===
Iran

- Islamic Republic of Iran Army Aviation

Taiwan

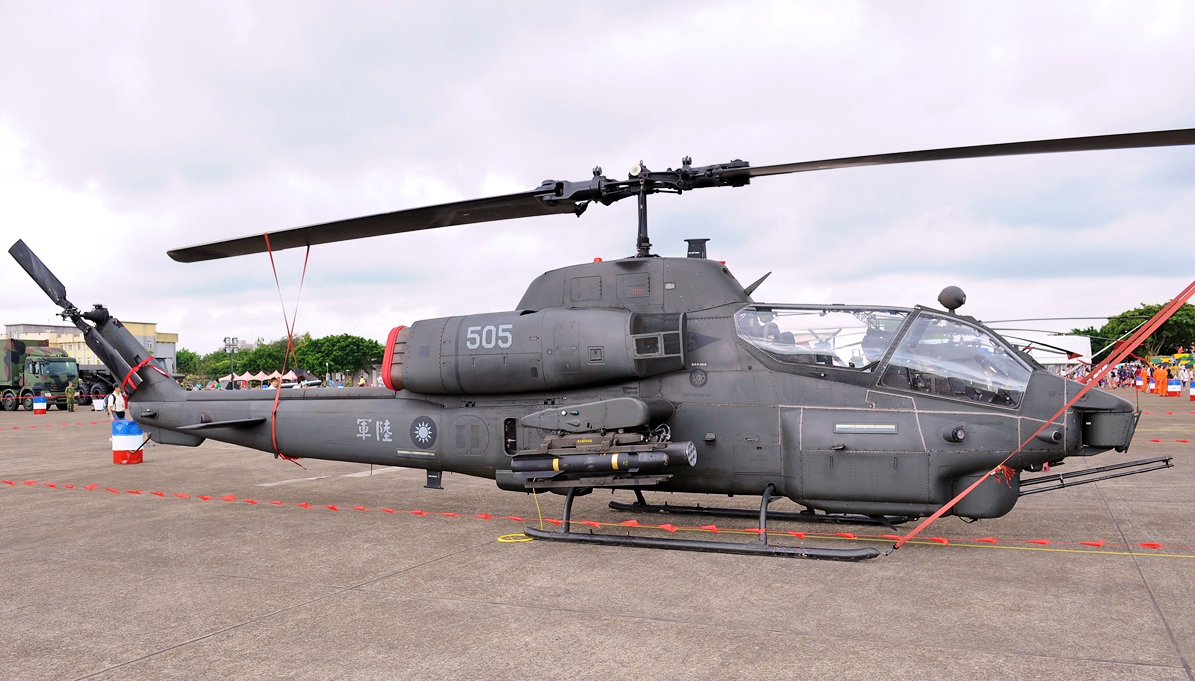
An AH-1W Super Cobra with the Republic of China Army

- Republic of China Army

Turkey

- Turkish Navy

=== Former ===
Imperial Iran

- Imperial Iranian Air Force

South Korea

- Republic of Korea Army

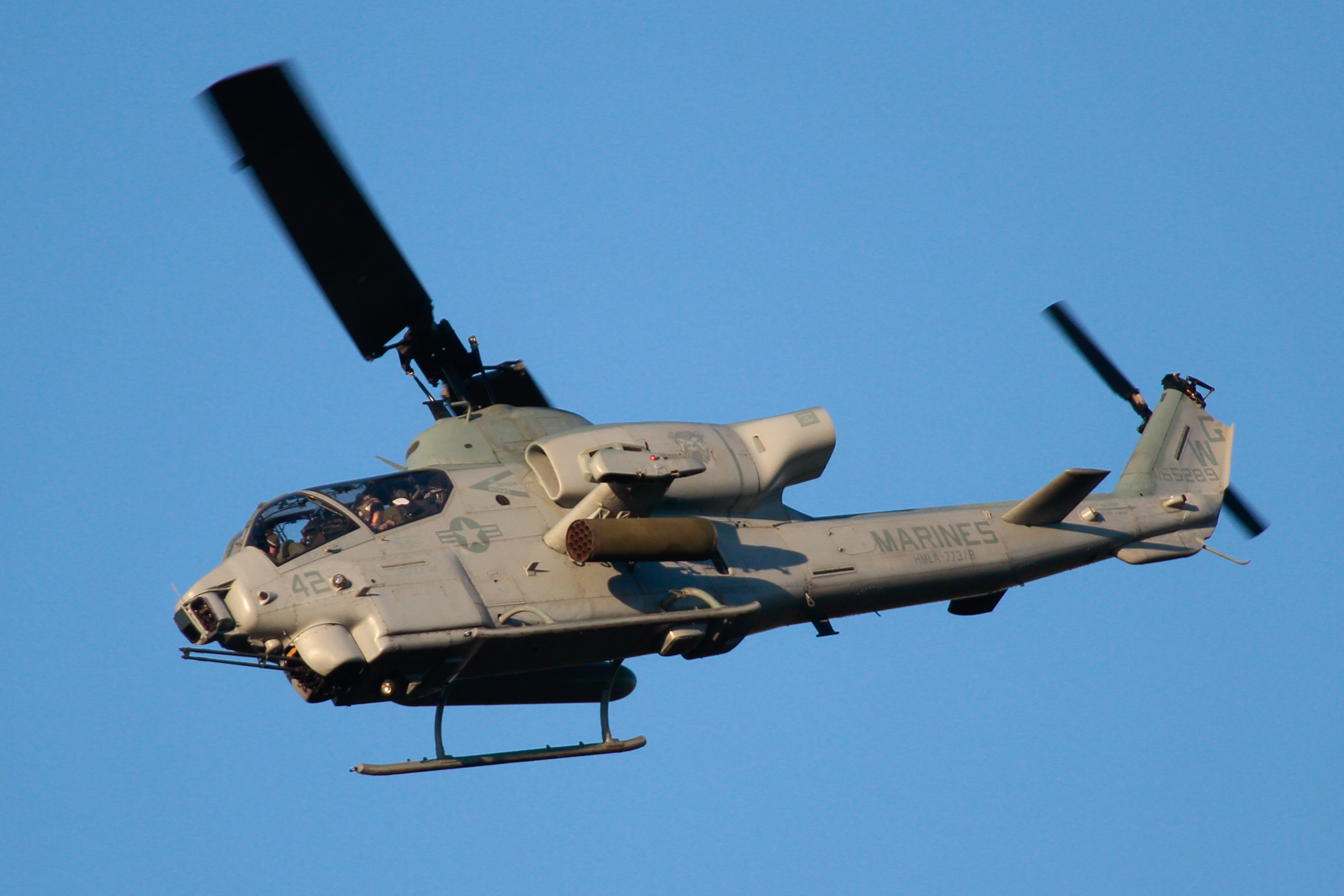
An AH-1W provides close air support during training exercise

United States

- United States Marine Corps (AH-1J and AH-1W variants)
  - HMLA-167
  - HMLA-169
  - HMLA-267
  - HMLA-269
  - HMLA-367
  - HMLA-369
  - HMLA-467
  - HMLA-469
  - HMLA-773
  - HMLAT-303

== Aircraft on display ==
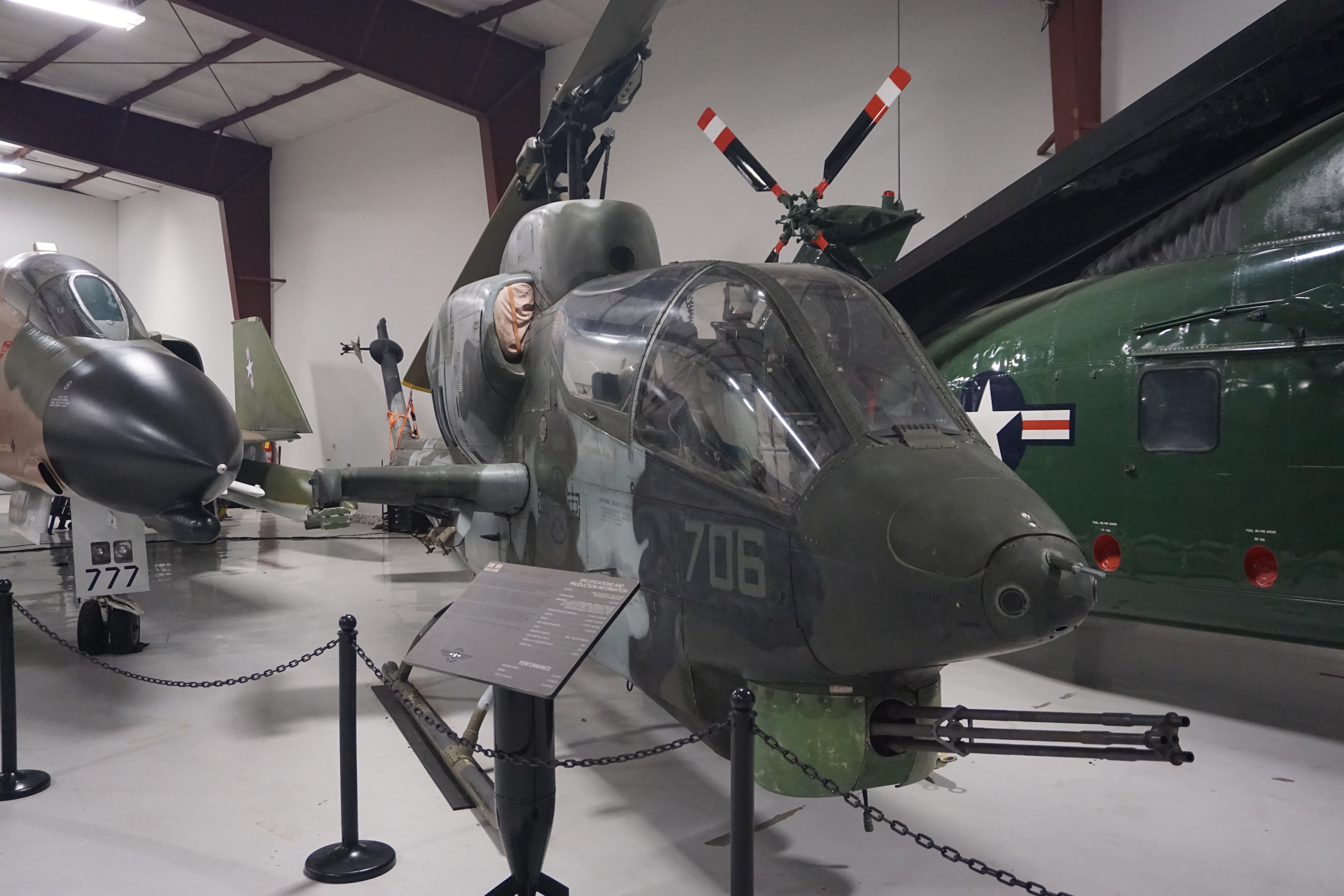
AH-1J at the Cavanaugh Flight Museum

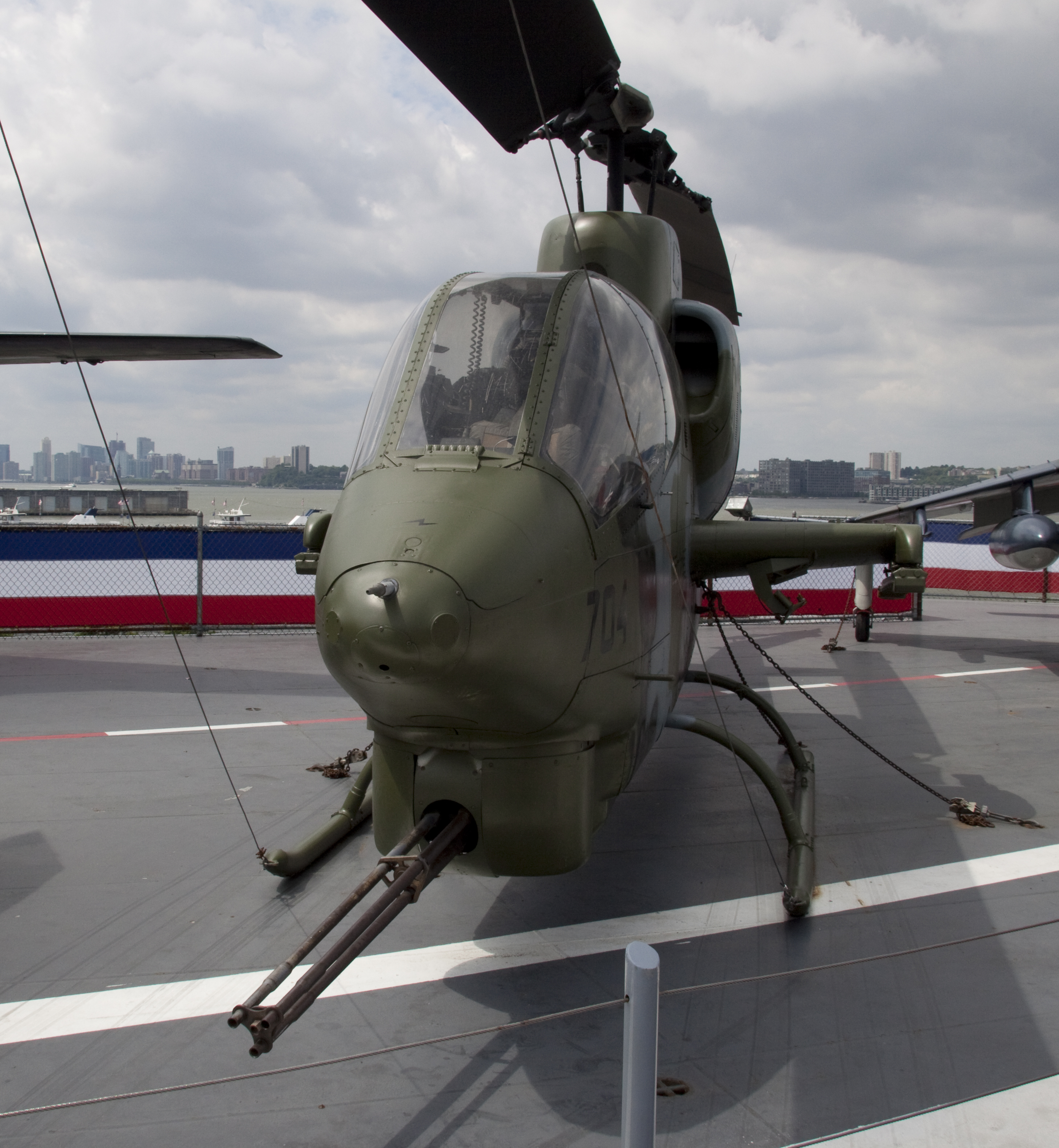
AH-1J at the Intrepid Sea, Air & Space Museum

=== South Korea ===
AH-1J

- 29066 – War Memorial of Korea

=== United States ===
AH-1J

- 157771 – Prairie Aviation Museum in Bloomington, Illinois
- 157784 – Flying Leatherneck Aviation Museum at MCAS Miramar, San Diego, California
- 159210 – Patriot's Point Naval & Maritime Museum, Charleston, South Carolina
- 159211 – Kalamazoo / Battle Creek, Michigan
- 159212 – Yankee Air Museum, Belleville, Michigan
- 159218 – New York Intrepid Sea, Air & Space Museum Pier 86, New York, New York

AH-1W

- 160820 – National Museum of the Marine Corps, Quantico, Virginia
- 160825 – Pima Air and Space Museum, Tucson, Arizona
- 161017 – Hickory Aviation Museum, Hickory, North Carolina
- 162558 – Barbers Point Aviation Museum, Oahu, Hawaii
- 163944 – MAG-24 Headquarters, MCAS Kaneohe Bay, Hawaii
- 164578 – Naval Aviation Museum, NAS Pensacola, Florida
- 165329 – Joint Base McGuire, New Jersey
- 165359 – HX-21 Hangar, NAS Patuxent River, Maryland
- 165367 – MCAS Kaneohe Bay, Hawaii
- 165369 – MCAS Camp Pendleton, California
- 165395 – MCAS Yuma, Arizona

== Specifications ==
=== AH-1J SeaCobra ===

Data from Bell AH-1 Cobra, Modern Fighting Aircraft

General characteristics

- Crew: 2
- Length: 53 ft 5 in (16.28 m) with both rotors turning

45 ft 9 in (14 m) for fuselage only

- Width: 10 ft 9 in (3.28 m) for stub wings only
- Height: 13 ft 5 in (4.09 m)
- Empty weight: 6,610 lb (2,998 kg)
- Max takeoff weight: 10,000 lb (4,536 kg)
- Powerplant: 1 × P&W Canada T400-CP-400 (PT6T-3 Twin-Pac) turboshaft engine, 1,530 shp (1,140 kW) (de-rated from 1,800 shp (1,342 kW) for drivetrain limitations)
- Main rotor diameter: 43 ft 11 in (13.39 m)
- Main rotor area: 1,514.97 sq ft (140.745 m^{2})
- Blade section: Wortmann FX 69-H-098

Performance

- Maximum speed: 152 kn (175 mph, 282 km/h)
- Never exceed speed: 190 kn (220 mph, 350 km/h)
- Range: 311 nmi (358 mi, 576 km)
- Service ceiling: 10,500 ft (3,200 m)
- Rate of climb: 1,090 ft/min (5.5 m/s)

Armament

- 20 mm (0.787 in) M197 3-barreled Gatling cannon in the M97 turret (750 rounds ammo capacity)
- 2.75 in (70 mm) Mk 40, or Hydra 70 rockets in 7 or 19 rounds pods
- 5 in (127 mm) Zuni rockets – up to 16 rockets in 4-round LAU-10D/A launchers
- AIM-9 Sidewinder anti-aircraft missiles – one mounted on each hardpoint

=== AH-1W SuperCobra ===

Data from Verier, Modern Fighting Aircraft, International Directory of Military Aircraft

General characteristics

- Crew: Two (pilot, co-pilot/gunner (CPG))
- Length: 58 ft 0 in (17.68 m) with both rotors turning

45 ft 7 in (14 m) for fuselage only

- Width: 10 ft 9 in (3.28 m) for stub wings only
- Height: 13 ft 9 in (4.19 m)
- Empty weight: 10,200 lb (4,627 kg)
- Max takeoff weight: 14,750 lb (6,690 kg)
- Powerplant: 2 × General Electric T700-401 turboshaft engine, 1,690 shp (1,260 kW) each (de-rated from 1,800 shp (1,342 kW) for drivetrain limitations)
- Main rotor diameter: 45 ft 7 in (13.89 m)
- Main rotor area: 1,514.97 sq ft (140.745 m^{2})

Performance

- Maximum speed: 190 kn (220 mph, 350 km/h)
- Never exceed speed: 190 kn (220 mph, 350 km/h)
- Range: 317 nmi (365 mi, 587 km)
- Service ceiling: 12,200 ft (3,700 m)
- Rate of climb: 1,620 ft/min (8.2 m/s)

Armament

- 20 mm (0.787 in) M197 3-barreled Gatling cannon in the A/A49E-7 turret (750 rounds ammo capacity)
- 2.75 in (70 mm) Hydra 70 or APKWS II rockets – Mounted in LAU-68C/A (7 shot) or LAU-61D/A (19 shot) launchers
- 5 in (127 mm) Zuni rockets – 8 rockets in two 4-round LAU-10D/A launchers
- TOW missiles – Up to 8 missiles mounted in two 4-round XM65 missile launchers, one on each outboard hardpoint
- AGM-114 Hellfire missiles – Up to 8 missiles mounted in two 4-round M272 missile launchers, one on each outboard hardpoint
- AGM-65 Maverick missiles - Up to 2 missiles mounted on hardpoints
- AIM-9 Sidewinder anti-aircraft missiles – 1 mounted on each outboard hardpoint (total of 2)

== See also ==
- U.S. Helicopter Armament Subsystems, AH-1

Related development

- Bell 309 KingCobra
- Bell AH-1 Cobra
- Bell AH-1Z Viper
- Bell UH-1N Twin Huey
- Bell UH-1Y Venom
- Bell YAH-63
- Panha 2091
- IAIO Toufan

Aircraft of comparable role, configuration, and era

- AgustaWestland Apache
- Agusta A129 Mangusta
- Boeing AH-64 Apache
- CAIC Z-10
- Denel Rooivalk
- Eurocopter Tiger
- HAL Prachand
- Harbin WZ-19
- Kamov Ka-50
- TAI/AgustaWestland T129 ATAK

Related lists

- List of active United States military aircraft
- List of attack aircraft
- List of rotorcraft
- List of military electronics of the United States
