= Iranian Air Force =

Iranian Air Force may refer to:

- Islamic Republic of Iran Air Force, the air force of the Islamic Republic of Iran Armed Forces (the conventional Iranian military)
- Islamic Republic of Iran Army Aviation, army aviation of the Islamic Republic of Iran Army Ground Forces (the territorial branch of the military)
- Islamic Revolutionary Guard Corps Aerospace Force, strategic missile, air, and space force of the Islamic Revolutionary Guard Corps (the regime's secondary military force)

== See also ==
- Air force history of Iran
