= Panha 2091 =

Iranian attack helicopter

Panha 2091 Toufan
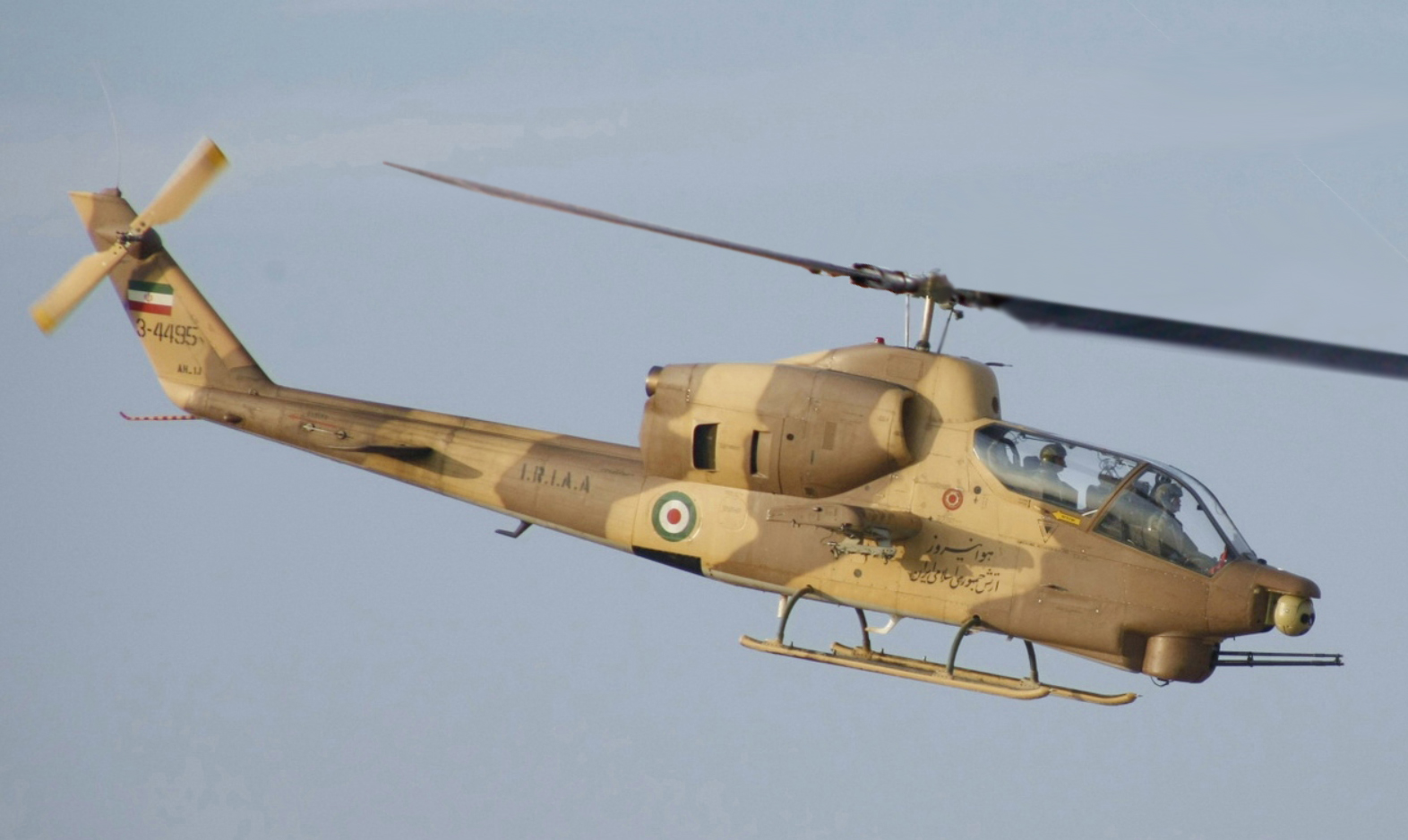
- Toufan in flight

General information
- Type: Attack helicopter
- Manufacturer: Bell Helicopter Textron; Panha
- Status: Active
- Primary user: Iranian Armed Forces; Artesh; Air Force; Ground Forces; Army Aviation; IRGC; Aerospace Force

History
- Introduction date: 1998
- Developed from: Bell AH-1J International

The Panha 2091 "Toufan" is an Iranian overhaul and upgrade of the Bell AH-1J International (export version of the SeaCobra) attack helicopter purchased before the 1979 Islamic Revolution. The overhaul and upgrade program is known as project number 2091 of the Iranian Helicopter Support and Renewal Company (also known as Panha).

== Design ==
Reported upgrades include:

- new cockpit armored panels
- new, Iranian-designed canopy
- new avionics
- nose-mounted camera
- new cockpit design

The upgraded attack helicopter has a narrower airframe for greater flexibility and is armed with an M197 three-barreled 20-mm Gatling-type cannon in the A/A49E turret. Its wing-stub stations carry a pair of 19-tube 70-mm rocket launchers.

Bulletproof glass protects the pilot's cockpit and weapons officer station, internal avionics have been revamped with the addition of a GPS and receiver in the nose, and a warning radar attached to the rear, with four antennae providing 360 degrees coverage and all electronics systems integrated.

== Specifications ==
General characteristics

- Crew: 2
- Length: 16 m (52 ft 6 in)
- Airfoil: Wortmann FX 69-H-098
- Empty weight: 2,802 kg (6,177 lb)
- Max takeoff weight: 4,530 kg (9,987 lb)
- Main rotor diameter: 13 m (42 ft 8 in)
- Main rotor area: 132.75 m^{2} (1,428.9 sq ft)

Performance

- Maximum speed: 236 km/h (147 mph, 127 kn)
- Range: 600 km (370 mi, 320 nmi)

Armament

- M197 3-barreled 20 mm "Gatling-style" cannon in the M97 turret (750 rounds ammo capacity)
- 2.75 in (70 mm) Mk 40 or Hydra 70 rockets in 7 or 19 round pods
- 5 in (127 mm) Zuni rockets - 8 rockets in two 4-round LAU-10D/A launchers
- AIM-9 Sidewinder / Misagh-2 Anti-Aircraft Missiles - 1 mounted on each hardpoint
- Toophan ATGM - 1 dual or quad launcher on each wing

== See also ==
- Defense industry of Iran
- Equipment of the Iranian Army
- Iran Aviation Industries Organization

Related development

- Bell AH-1 Cobra
- Bell AH-1 SuperCobra
- IAIO Toufan

Aircraft of comparable role, configuration, and era

- Agusta A129 Mangusta
- AgustaWestland Apache
- Boeing AH-64 Apache
- CAIC Z-10
- Denel Rooivalk
- Eurocopter Tiger
- HAL Prachand
- Harbin Z-19
- Kamov Ka-50
- Kawasaki OH-1
- Mil Mi-24
- Mil Mi-28
- TAI/AgustaWestland T129 ATAK

Related lists

- List of aircraft of the Iranian Air Force
- List of attack aircraft
- List of rotorcraft
