= IAIO Toufan =

Iranian attack helicopter

Toufan I, II
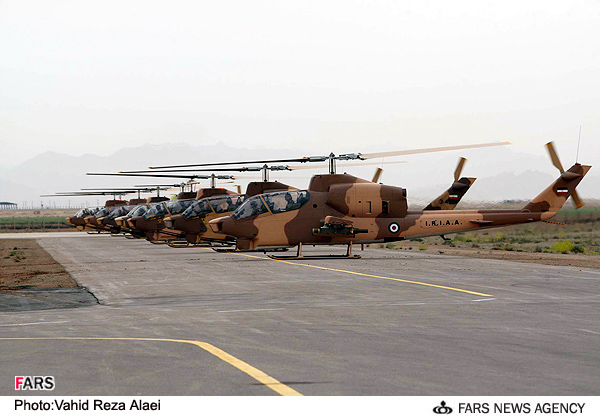
- Toufan I attack helicopters

General information
- Type: Attack helicopter
- Manufacturer: Iran Aviation Industries Organization (IAIO)
- Status: In service
- Primary user: Iranian Armed Forces; IRGC; Ground Forces; Aviation Unit; Artesh; Ground Forces; Army Aviation

History
- First flight: May 2010
- Developed from: Bell AH-1J International Cobra

The IAIO Toufan or Toophan (Persian: توفان) is series of combat helicopters by the Iran Aviation Industries Organization. Based on the US-built AH-1J SeaCobra, the Toufan has two variants, the Toufan I unveiled in May 2010 and the improved Toufan II unveiled in January 2013.

== Design ==
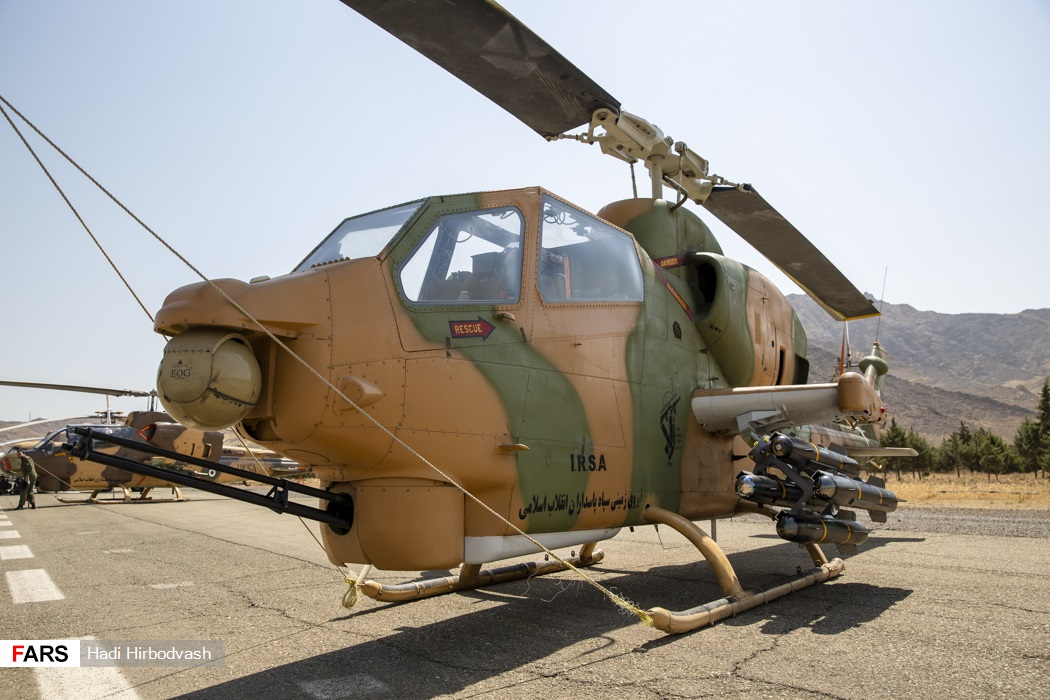
Toufan II

The aircraft incorporates a new laser system, a rocket-launch digital control system, a multi-display monitor, and a central smart arms management system. Toufan II has significant upgrades which include the new Eagle-1 electro-optical system, new multifunctional displays (MFDs) instead of several older analog displays, new HUD system and the installation of auxiliary systems on the pilots' helmet. It also has a new canopy, an infrared front-facing camera, which allows the pilot to fly at night and in adverse weather conditions, allowing for better tracking of targets in all weather conditions, and installation of new antennas under the fuselage.

== Operators ==
- Iran
  - Iranian Armed Forces
    - Artesh
      - Ground Forces
        - Army Aviation
    - IRGC
      - Ground Forces
        - Aviation Unit

== See also ==
Related development

- Bell 309 KingCobra
- Bell AH-1 Cobra
- Bell AH-1Z Viper
- Bell UH-1N Twin Huey
- Bell UH-1Y Venom
- Bell AH-1 SuperCobra
- Bell YAH-63
- Panha 2091

Aircraft of comparable role, configuration, and era

- Agusta A129 Mangusta
- AgustaWestland Apache
- Boeing AH-64 Apache
- CAIC Z-10
- Denel Rooivalk
- Eurocopter Tiger
- HAL Prachand
- Harbin Z-19
- Kamov Ka-50
- Kawasaki OH-1
- Mil Mi-24
- Mil Mi-28
- TAI/AgustaWestland T129 ATAK

Related lists

- List of attack aircraft
- List of rotorcraft
