= HMLA-267 =

Marine Light Attack Helicopter Squadron 267
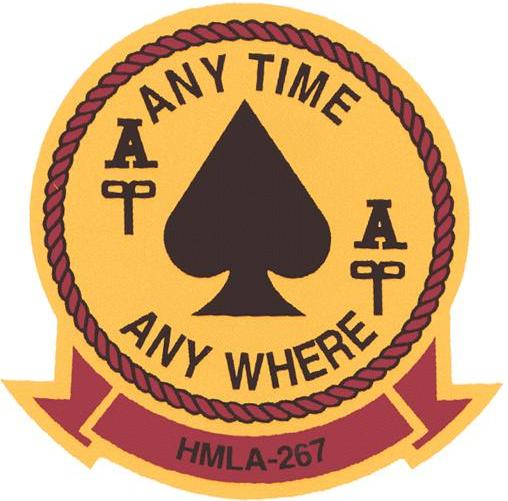
- HMLA-267 Insignia
- Active: 15 February 1944 – 31 January 1946 15 December 1966 - present
- Country: United States
- Allegiance: United States
- Branch: United States Marine Corps
- Type: Light/Attack squadron
- Role: Close Air Support
- Part of: Marine Aircraft Group 39; 3rd Marine Aircraft Wing
- Garrison/HQ: Marine Corps Air Station Camp Pendleton
- Nickname: Stingers
- Motto: "Anytime Anywhere"
- Tail Code: UV
- Engagements: World War II * Battle of Iwo Jima; Vietnam War; Operation Restore Hope; Operation Iraqi Freedom * 2003 invasion of Iraq * Operation Enduring Freedom

Commanders
- Squadron Commander: LtCol Michael C. Oates
- Squadron Sergeant Major: SgtMaj Christopher M. A. Ivester

Marine Light Attack Helicopter Squadron 267 (HMLA-267) is a United States Marine Corps helicopter squadron consisting of Bell AH-1Z Viper attack helicopters and Bell UH-1Y Venom utility helicopters. Nicknamed the "Stingers", the squadron is based at Marine Corps Air Station Camp Pendleton in California, and falls under the command of Marine Aircraft Group 39 (MAG-39) and the 3rd Marine Aircraft Wing (3rd MAW).

== Mission ==
Marine Light Attack Helicopter Squadron (HMLA) 267 supports the Marine Air-Ground Task Force (MAGTF) Commander by providing offensive air support, utility support, armed escort, and airborne supporting arms coordination; day or night; under all weather conditions; during expeditionary, joint, or combined operations. This has included detachments to Marine Amphibious Units (MAUs) and Marine Expeditionary Units (MEUs).

== History ==
=== Origins and World War II service ===
The squadron was commissioned on 15 February 1944 at Marine Corps Base Quantico in Virginia as Marine Observation Squadron 5 (VMO-5), the "Black Aces." The operational aircraft at the time was the OY-1 Sentinel. VMO-5's primary tasks were providing aerial fire support spotting and observation in support of ground forces. Following several months of training at MCB Camp Pendleton in California and Marine Corps Air Station Ewa in Hawaii, the squadron deployed with the 3d Marine Aircraft Wing (3d MAW) to the Pacific Theater. The squadron split into two echelons, staging at Saipan and Guam in preparation for the Iwo Jima Campaign. On 26 February 1945, the first VMO-5 OY-1 Sentinels took off from the USS Wake Island and landed on South Field during the Battle of Iwo Jima. Beginning the next day squadron aircraft began spotting for the artillery of the 13th Marine Regiment. After Iwo Jima, the squadron redeployed to Hilo, Hawaii, and was attached to Marine Observation Group 1, 2d Marine Aircraft Wing (2d MAW). Following victory in World War II, VMO-5 deployed to Sasebo, Japan, for occupation duty from September 1945 to January 1946. Upon completion of this tour, VMO-5 returned to San Diego and was decommissioned on 31 January 1946.

=== Vietnam ===
As Marine Corps participation in the Vietnam War continued to increase, the subunit of Headquarters and Maintenance Squadron 30 (H&MS-30) at Marine Corps Base Camp Pendleton was re-designated as VMO-5 on 15 December 1966 becoming a full-fledged training squadron. The squadron originally fell under the command of Marine Helicopter Training Group 30 (MHTG-30), 3rd Marine Aircraft Wing and was equipped with a complement of UH-1E Hueys and OV-10 Broncos. In March 1968, the squadron was re-designated HML-267 and remained on alert status while training replacement pilots and crew for the rest of the war. In 1971, reorganization left the squadron with only UH-1E helicopters, and by the end of 1976 only UH-1N aircraft were flown.

=== Post Vietnam ===
Beginning in the 1970s, every six months HML-267 rotated one-third of its assets to Marine Corps Air Station Futenma on Okinawa, Japan. The Hueys were joined by another aircraft in 1982 as the new AH-1J Cobras were deployed. As part of the Unit Deployment Program (UDP) starting in 1983, HML-267 began a regular cycle of six months in Okinawa, 18 months on Camp Pendleton. During this time the squadron participated in numerous training exercises including detachments to Korea, Guam, the Philippines, Hong Kong, Iwo Jima, and Australia. The squadron was again re-designated as HMLA-267 in 1987, the squadron received its first complement of AH-1W SuperCobras. In 1988, the squadron split into three groups: a detachment on UDP to Okinawa, a detachment as part of a Marine expeditionary unit, and a detachment aboard USS Dubuque.

In 1990, HMLA-267 split into two groups: a detachment on UDP in Okinawa and another attached to HMM-164. The group attached to HMM-164 boarded the USS Okinawa on a routine WestPac deployment. USS Okinawa eventually ended up in the Persian Gulf for Operation Desert Shield and Operation Desert Storm, spending a total of 354 days away from their home port for this deployment.

In 1992, HMLA-267 split into two groups: a detachment on land in Okinawa and another attached to HMM-164. The group attached to HMM-164 boarded USS Tripoli on a routine West Pac. USS Tripoli went back to the Persian Gulf for Operation Desert Sweep. The next stop for USS Tripoli was Mogadishu, Somalia, and was part of the original insertion of Marines (primarily those from HMLA-267) and the beginning of Operation Restore Hope.

In January 1995 HMLA-267 embarked on LHA-3 as the Aviation Combat Element of SPMAGTF 1-95 to provide air support for Operation United Shield in Somalia.

=== Global war on terror ===
In January 2003, HMLA-267 deployed aboard Amphibious Task Force West in support of Operation Iraqi Freedom. The Stingers relocated to Ali Al Salem Airbase, Kuwait February 2003 in preparation of Operation Iraqi Freedom. HMLA-267 supported the I Marine Expeditionary Force (I MEF) conducting combat operations throughout Iraq from 20 March 2003 until ordered to return to the United States in May 2003. During Operation Iraqi Freedom, the Stingers flew over 2100 combat flight hours and 1400 combat sorties in support of I MEF combat operations in just three weeks.

In June 2003, HMLA-267 participated in the Unit Deployment Program to Okinawa, Japan. During this period, the Stingers conducted exercises in South Korea, Australia and the Republic of the Philippines. From August through October 2003, the Squadron detached three UH-1N aircraft, thirteen pilots and one hundred Marines to Joint Task Force 515, in support of Operation Enduring Freedom. This detachment was selected to provide aerial escort for the President of the United States as he toured the Republic of the Philippines, the second time this HMLA has been so honored.

In October 2003, HMLA-267 was presented the John P. Giguere Award for the Marine Light Attack Helicopter Squadron of the Year for 2003.

In June 2004, a detachment of 4 AH-1W Cobras and 2 UH-1N Hueys attached to Marine Medium Helicopter Squadron 165 (REIN) on the 15th MEU. At the end of that year HMLA-267 became the sole provider of HMLA detachments to the 11th, 13th, 15th, and 31st Marine Expeditionary Units (MEU's) in support of I MEF and III MEF. While other MAG 39 squadrons continued to deploy to Iraq in support of counter-insurgency operations there, the Stingers began regularly deploying from Southern California and Okinawa to the Western Pacific and East Asia.

In April 2010, the Squadron's mission officially changed to support Operation Enduring Freedom (OEF).

In 2011 HMLA 267 deployed to Afghanistan in support of Operation Enduring Freedom.

As of April 2012, HMLA-267 transitioned completely from the AH-1W to the AH-1Z Viper, ending their decades long usage of the Whiskey. HMLA-267 was the first HMLA to completely transition to the AH-1Z and the UH-1Y.

In March 2017, HMLA-267 was presented the John P. Giguere Award for the Marine Light Attack Helicopter Squadron of the Year for 2017.

== Unit awards ==
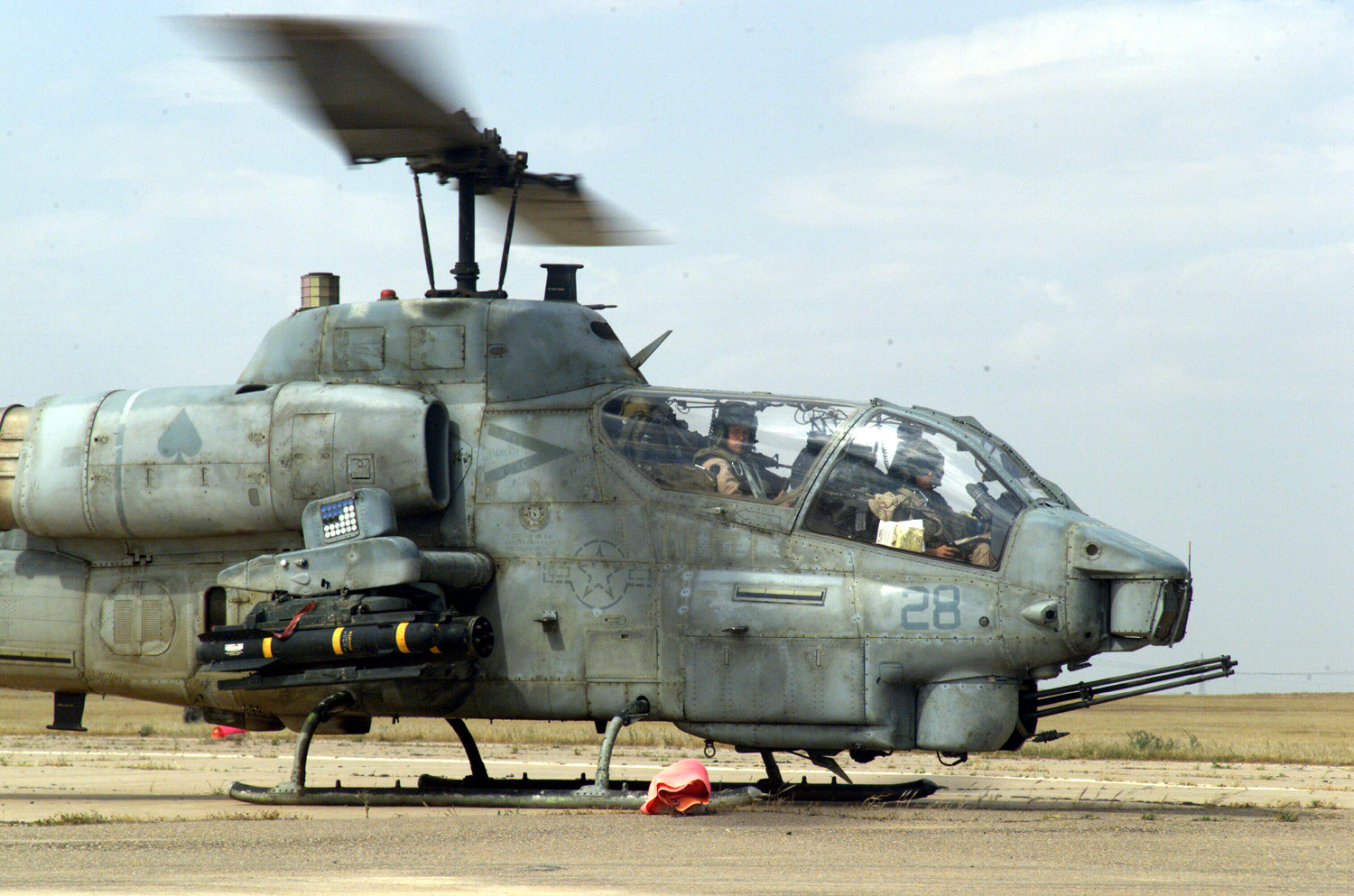
HMLA-267 AH-1W Cobra flown by former HMLA-267 CO, LtCol Stephen Heywood (RS) and future CO LtCol Jon Livingston (FS) during Operation Iraqi Freedom (LtCol Livingston was a Captain at the time this photo was taken).

A unit citation or commendation is an award bestowed upon an organization for the action cited. Members of the unit who participated in said actions are allowed to wear on their uniforms the awarded unit citation. HMLA-267 has been presented with the following awards:

Streamer	Award	Year(s)	Additional Info
	Presidential Unit Citation Streamer	2003	Iraq
	Navy Unit Commendation Streamer with two Bronze Stars	1945, 1992-92, 2003	Iwo Jima, Somalia, Iraq
	Meritorious Unit Commendation Streamer with one Silver Star	1975-76, 1980–82, 1984–86, 1986–88, 1998–99, 2000–02	
	Asiatic-Pacific Campaign Streamer with one Bronze Star		Iwo Jima
	World War II Victory Streamer	1941–1945	Pacific War
	Navy Occupation Service Streamer with "ASIA"		
	National Defense Service Streamer with two Bronze Stars	1961–1974, 1990–1995, 2001–present	Vietnam War, Gulf War, war on terrorism
	Afghanistan Campaign Streamer with two bronze stars		
A multicolored streamer with (from outer to inner) red, white, green, white again, black (the colors of the Iraqi flag) horizontal stripes with a yellow horizontal stripe in the center	Iraq Campaign Streamer with two bronze stars		
	Global War on Terrorism Expeditionary Streamer	2001–present	
A blue streamer with yellow, red, and white horizontal stripes	Global War on Terrorism Service Streamer	2001–present	

== See also ==
- List of United States Marine Corps aircraft squadrons
- United States Marine Corps Aviation
