= Ahmad Keshvari =

Iranian aviator (1953–1980)

- احمد کشوری
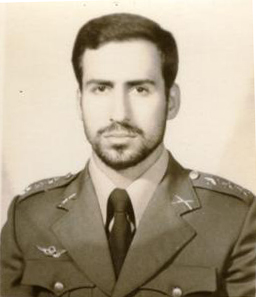
- Born: July 1951; Simorgh County Mazandaran Province, Imperial State of Iran
- Died: 7 December 1980 (aged 29); Tang-e Bina, Meymak region, Ilam, Iran
- Burial place: Behesht-e Zahra cemetery, Tehran
- Education: Imam Ali University, Bachelor of Military Science
- Military career
- Allegiance: (Pahlavi Iran) Imperial State of Iran (1972–1979); Islamic Republic of Iran (1979–1980)
- Branch: Imperial Iranian Army Aviation; Islamic Republic of Iran Army Aviation
- Service years: 1972–1980
- Rank: Brigadier General (promoted posthumously)
- Commands: Ilam Army Aviation Unit
- Conflicts: 1979 Kurdish Rebellion (WIA); Siege of Paveh; Iran–Iraq War †

Ahmad Keshvari (Persian: احمد کشوری; July 1953 – 7 December 1980) was an Iranian military helicopter pilot in the Iranian Army Aviation who is known for his prominent role in the early months of the Iran-Iraq War where he stopped Iraqi armored columns from further advancing into western Iran.

He was known to often use the word "Simorgh" as the code name for his operations, thus the word is sometimes used to refer to him (in the title of works, etc.). The former Kiakola District of Qaemshahr County was separated as a new county in 2012, and its name was changed to Simorgh County by then-President Mahmoud Ahmadinejad after a non-official request by Keshvari's mother. Keshvari Rural District in Ilam, Keshvari Rural District in Mazanderan, and Keshvari Expressway in Isfahan provinces, as well as Shahid Keshvari Bridge of Babol are named after him. In the Shahid Keshvari Square of Kiakola, a statue of an AH-1J SeaCobra has been built to honor Keshvari. The date of his death, 7 December, is celebrated as "Army Aviation Day" in the Iranian military calendar, and has been proposed by the Iranian Army to be included in the official Iranian calendar.

== Early life ==
Keshvari was born in July 1953 to a middle-class family in Kiakola, Mazandaran Province, Iran. His parents were from Borujerd, Lorestan Province. His father, Gholamhossein, was in the Imperial Iranian Gendarmerie, and had to migrate to various towns because of his job. His mother, Fatemeh Silakhori, was a religious and pro-Revolution woman. He spent his primary school and the three years of his high school in Kiakola, Mazanderan and then spent the rest of his high school education in the Qanad High School in Sarepol-e Talar village in Babol, Mazanderan.

== Military career ==
In 1972, he joined the Imperial Iranian Army Aviation and passed the Bell 206 JetRanger and AH-1 Cobra piloting courses, earning the ranking of assistant lieutenant. When the Iranian Revolution began, Keshvari had an active role in the revolution. For engaging in activities against the Shah he was arrested and interrogated by SAVAK. When he started his job in Kermanshah, he started to identify poor people in the city. He could then organize a community fund with the help of some of his colleagues and the assistance of the Aviation Forces. He was also made commander of the Ilam Army Aviation Unit.

After the revolution, he participated in the operations to clear the Kurdistan and Kermanshah provinces in western Iran from Kurdish guerillas during the 1979 Kurdish rebellion in Iran. Paveh, a city in western Iran, became the center of clashes in the Kermanshah Province and came under attack by Kurdish rebels. Iranian revolutionary, Mostafa Chamran, and his men were besieged. According to Major General Valiollah Fallahi, Keshvari was the first volunteer to launch an operation in Paveh Keshvari, along with Ali Akbar Shiroodi, Soheilian, and several others, performed an impressive operation and broke the Siege of Paveh and eventually liberating the city.

In September 1980, when the Iran-Iraq War began, Keshvari, who had been wounded in the chest in the earlier 1979 Kurdish rebellion, immediately joined the battlefield, while having another scheduled surgery. The Iraqis, with tanks and armoured vehicles, were advancing in large convoys toward Iranian territory. Keshvari usually had to rely on intelligence provided by the local people, using a unit comprising several (TOW-capable) AH-1J SeaCobras, and a Bell 206A JetRanger multi-purpose utility helicopter, was attacking the convoy from both the front and behind, creating confusion and chaos inside the convoy, and then retreating while another similar unit launched the final attack against the convoy. Using this tactic, which he named "Bekâv-o-Bokosh" (بکاو و بکش, literally "Seek n Destroy"), which in turn later became the name of his aviation units. Keshvari's units managed to stop Iraqi tanks from further advancing into the Iranian territory and destroyed many Iraqi convoys in the western battlefields. In the initial phases of the war, before IRGC and Basij forces had been formed, he was flying almost 12 hours per day, even though it was against aviation standards and rules.

== Martyrdom ==
On 7 December 1980, at the age of 27, Keshvari and his co-pilot Rahim Pezeshki, along with another AH-1J SeaCobra piloted by Ali Akbar Shiroodi, and a Bell 206A JetRanger utility helicopter, launched Operation Ashura to destroy an Iraqi military convoy near the border of Ilam Province, advancing deeper into Iranian territory. The convoy was destroyed, but two Iraqi MiG-21s appeared and approached Keshvari's helicopter. Keshvari told the other two helicopters to retreat, and drew attention of the Iraqi fighters while heading toward an Iranian Air Defense site. The fighters attacked Keshvari's helicopter, causing it to crash. The JetRanger rescued the co-pilot Pezeshki, but was forced to flee and leave Keshvari's body as the Iraqi fighters were going to make another pass. A surface-to-air missile from the air defense site downed one of the MiG-21s, while the second MiG fled. Keshvari's body was transferred to Kermanshah and was later buried in Tehran's Behesht-e Zahra cemetery as a military personnel in the 24th plot.

In 1982, his brother, Mohammad, then aged under 17, joined the war, and was martyred in action in Qasr-e Shirin during Operation Muharram.

== In popular culture ==
In the documentary film Ravayat-e Fath (روایت فتح, "The Chronicles of Victory"), directed by Morteza Aviny and filmed during the Iran–Iraq war, there is an interview with Keshvari's uncle who was serving in the artillery, in Season Three.

Simorgh (December 1999), ed. Hojjat Shah-Mohammadi, Seyyed Amir Ma'soumi, Tehran: Haft, ISBN 964-92199-1-9, 212 pages; consisted of brief biographies of Ahmad Keshvari and Ali Akbar Shiroodi, and a collection of memories of officers and other people about them.

In 1992, Iranian television made a series that was about pilots of the western war zone such as Ali Akbar Shiroodi, Ahmad Keshvari, and Soheilian. Muhammad Jozani and Javad Hashemi portrayed Shiroodi and Ahmad Keshvari's roles, respectively, in this series whose director was Hossein Ghasemi Jami.

Flight Wing, which was presented at the 26th Tehran International Book Fair, reflects on the life of Ahmad Keshvari and has been written in a fictional way for young readers.

Dance of Dandelions (رقص قاصدک‌ها Raghs-e Ghāsedak-hā) is a 2015 animated film directed by Vahid Shakeri and produced by Saba Animation Center. It depicts the last three days of Keshvari's life. It was awarded in 13th International Resistance Film Festival – Best Animation.

== See also ==
- List of Iranian commanders in the Iran–Iraq War
