= Harbin Z-19 =

Chinese reconnaissance and attack helicopter

Z-19 Black Whirlwind
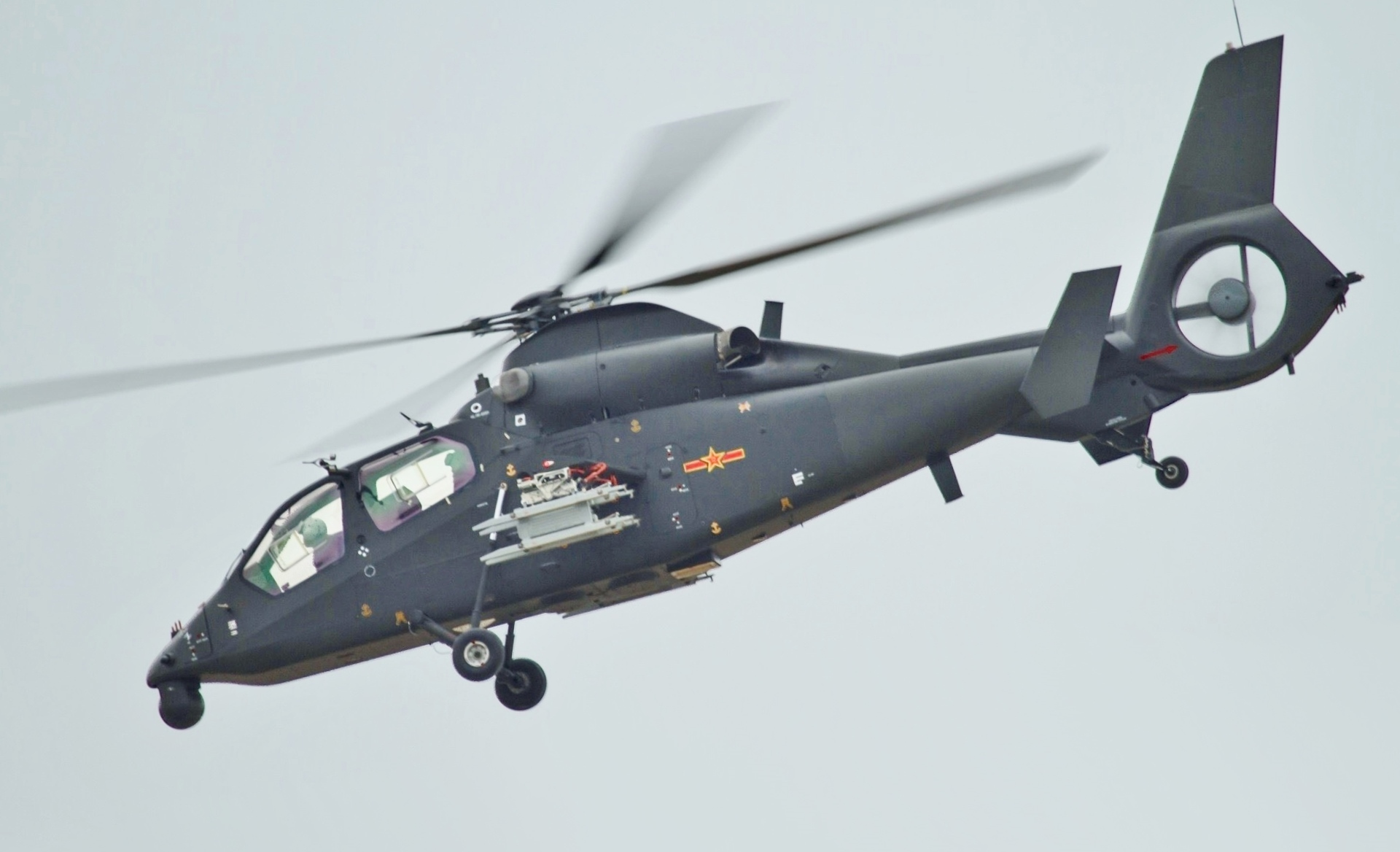
- Harbin Z-19 making a low-level pass at Zhuhai Airshow 2012

General information
- Type: Reconnaissance and attack helicopter
- Manufacturer: Harbin Aircraft Manufacturing Corporation
- Status: In service
- Primary user: People's Liberation Army Ground Force
- Number built: 200+

History
- Manufactured: 2011-Present
- Introduction date: 2012
- First flight: 2011
- Developed from: Harbin Z-9W

The Harbin Z-19 is a Chinese light reconnaissance/attack helicopter developed by Harbin Aircraft Manufacturing Corporation (HAMC) for the People's Liberation Army Air Force and the Ground Force Army Aviation. It is a specialized combat variant of the Harbin Z-9, which is a license-built version of the Eurocopter Dauphin.

== Design and development ==
The Z-19 is an upgraded tandem seat version of the Harbin Z-9W (similar to the development of the Bell AH-1 Cobra from the UH-1), using mechanical components derived from the Eurocopter AS365 Dauphin series, as the Z-9 series are license-built versions of the Dauphin helicopters.

The Z-19 features a fenestron tail, reducing the noise level and therefore allowing it to achieve some level of acoustic stealthiness. The exhausts have also been designed to reduce the infrared signature. The helicopter is equipped with a millimeter-wave fire-control radar on top of its four-blade rotor. Unlike most other attack helicopters, it lacks a nose-mounted machine gun or autocannon.

The Z-19 also features armor plating, crash-resistant seats, and a turret with FLIR, TV, and laser rangefinder. It is also equipped with advanced helmet mounted sight (HMS), which looks different from that of the CAIC Z-10.

The general designer of the Z-19 was Wu Ximing (吴希明) of the 602nd Research Institute, one of the Chinese top scientists involved in the 863 Program, after graduating from Nanjing University of Aeronautics and Astronautics in 1984. Wu had earlier participated in the designs of the armed version of the transport helicopters Z-8A, Z-11 and Z-9. He also participated in the development and flight testing of another Chinese attack helicopter, the CAIC Z-10. At the 9th Zhuhai Airshow held in November 2012, Aviation Industry Corporation of China formally announced the official names of the Z-10 and Z-19 at a televised news release conference, with both attack helicopters named after fictional characters in the Water Margin, one of the Four Great Classical Novels of Chinese literature. Z-10 is named as Fierce Thunderbolt (Pili Huo, 霹雳火), the nickname of Qin Ming, while Z-19 is named as Black Whirlwind (Hei Xuanfeng, 黑旋风), the nickname of Li Kui.

== Variants ==
Z-19
Original version in the PLAGF service.
Z-19E
Export version of the Z-19. The first flight occurred on 18 May 2017. A number of countries expressed interest in acquisition.

== Operators ==
China

- People's Liberation Army Ground Force

== Specifications (Z-19) ==
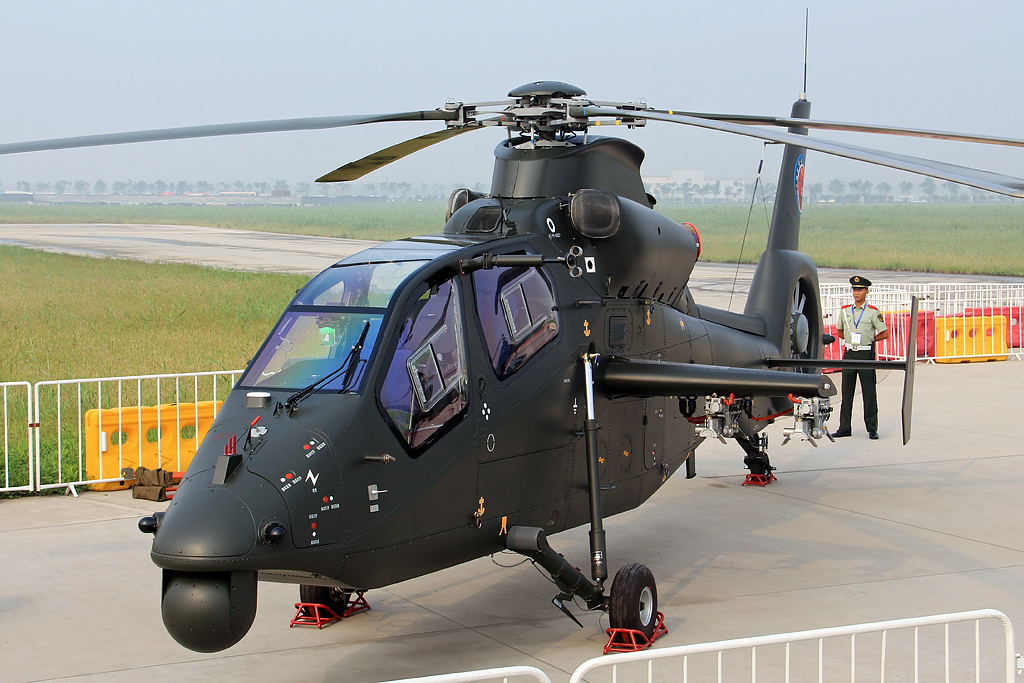
Harbin Z-19 at the China Helicopter Exposition, Tianjin 2013

Data from

General characteristics

- Crew: Two, pilot and observer
- Length: 12 m (39 ft 4 in)
- Height: 4.01 m (13 ft 2 in)
- Empty weight: 2,350 kg (5,181 lb)
- Max takeoff weight: 4,250 kg (9,370 lb)
- Powerplant: 2 × WZ-8C turboshafts, 700 kW (940 hp) each
- Main rotor diameter: 11.93 m (39 ft 2 in)
- Main rotor area: 111.79 m^{2} (1,203.3 sq ft)

Performance

- Maximum speed: 280 km/h (170 mph, 150 kn)
- Cruise speed: 245 km/h (152 mph, 132 kn)
- Range: 700 km (430 mi, 380 nmi)
- Endurance: 4 hours
- Service ceiling: 6,000 m (19,685 ft)
- Rate of climb: 9 m/s (1,800 ft/min)

Armament

- 2 pylons for rockets, gun pods, cannon pods, 8× HJ-8 or other anti-tank/air-to-surface/anti-ship missiles, 8× TY-90 air-to-air missiles.

Avionics

- Unknown type millimeter-wavelength electronically scanned array radar

== See also ==
Related development

- Changhe Z-10
- Eurocopter AS365 Dauphin/Eurocopter AS565 Panther
- Harbin Z-9

Aircraft of comparable role, configuration, and era

- Agusta A129 Mangusta
- Bell AH-1 Cobra
- Boeing–Sikorsky RAH-66 Comanche
- Eurocopter Tiger
- HAL Prachand
- IAIO Toufan
- Kawasaki OH-1
- Panha 2091
- TAI/AgustaWestland T129

Related lists

- List of helicopters
