= Islamic Republic of Iran Army Aviation =

- هوانيروز ارتش جمهوری اسلامی ایران
- Official seal of Islamic Republic of Iran Army Aviation
- Active: 1962–1979 (as Imperial Iranian Army Aviation); 1979–present
- Country: Iran
- Branch: Islamic Republic of Iran Army Ground Forces
- Type: Army Aviation
- Size: 50,000 personnel
- Nickname: Havanirooz (هوانیروز)
- Anniversaries: 7 December
- Engagements: Dhofar war 1979 Kurdish rebellion Iran–Iraq War; War on ISIL
- Flying hours: 800,000 (1979–2011)

Commanders
- Current commander: Brig. Gen. Ghasem Khamoushi (2024–present)
- Notable commanders: Brig. Gen. Manouchehr Khosrodad (1972–1979); Second Brig. Gen. Mohammad Hossein Jalali

Insignia
- Flag

The Islamic Republic of Iran Army Aviation (IRIAA) (in Persian: هواپیمایی نیروی زمینی جمهوری اسلامی ایران), more commonly known as the Havānīrūz (هوانیروز, Persian pronunciation: [hævɒːniːˈɾuːz]), is the army aviation of the Islamic Republic of Iran Army Ground Forces. It has about 300 helicopters both for attack and transport missions. It fought in the Iran–Iraq War in the 1980s, in which the Havānīrūz played a crucial role in destroying and defeating the invading Iraqi armies. The war saw the most intensive use of helicopters in a conventional conflict ever.

Along with its primary military role of aviation support for the ground forces, the Army Aviation is also involved in emergency management missions, such as search and rescue, medical evacuation, and forest firefighting.

Havānīrūz members have the same rank insignia and titles as the rest of the Army.

== Role ==
The main role of Havānīrūz is aviation support for ground forces. Its military role include assault duties, anti-tank warfare, reconnaissance, liaison, escorting military columns and transportation, special operations, infiltration operations, directing artillery and mortar fire, as a covering force, delivering suppressive fire, illuminating the battlefield, combat search and rescue (CSAR), and air-to-air combat (see the § Iran–Iraq War section).

Beside military duties, Havānīrūz is involved in civil duties, including emergency management (firefighting, medevac, search and rescue) and aerial photography.

== History ==
=== Imperial Iranian Army Aviation ===
The seal of Imperial Iranian Army Aviation

In 1962, the core of the force was established as the Imperial Iranian Army Aviation (IIAA) during the Pahlavi era as part of the Imperial Iranian Army with 6 Cessna 180 (U-17) aircraft and 6 pilots based in Isfahan. Officers were sent to the United States to be trained. The number of aircraft was 30 by 1966. In 1966, 17 Kaman HH-43B Huskie helicopters were purchased from the United States. Iran also received 12 Cessna O-2As, which still can fly but are out of service.

In 1971, the unit was expanded from an Aviation Battalion into an Aviation Regiment, with the purchase of Agusta-Bell 205A Iroquois and Agusta-Bell 206 JetRanger helicopters from Italy. Officers were sent to Italy for the related flight and technical courses. The Cessnas were phased out of service as the 205A's became operational.

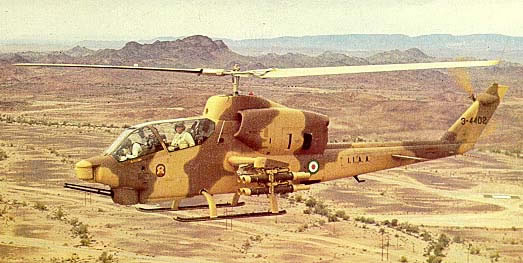
An AH-1J International of Imperial Iranian Army Aviation

In 1973, a group of American advisors arrived in Iran to assess the geography and climate of Iran. It was decided to establish three combat units in Kermanshah, Masjed Soleyman, and Kerman, and one general support unit in Isfahan, and a pilot and technical education center at Vatanpour Airbase.

202 Bell AH-1J Internationals, 62 of which were TOW-capable, and 287 Bell 214A/C Isfahan helicopters were purchased from the United States. American trainers were stationed at the Isfahan and Kermanshah education centers. Army Aviation was supposed to have become fully operational by 1982. The project was interrupted by the 1979 Revolution. After the Revolution, Iran took delivery of 70 Boeing (Elicotteri Meridionali) CH-47C Chinooks and 11 more from Italy.

Imperial Iranian Army Aviation was one of the Iranian forces that participated in the Dhofar Rebellion in Oman.

=== 1979 Revolution ===
After the 1979 Revolution, the commander of the Imperial Iranian Army Aviation, Manouchehr Khosrodad, was executed. He was also the founder and former commander of the 23rd Airborne Special Forces Brigade, also known as NOWHED.

The force, which is now called Islamic Republic of Iran Army Aviation, participated in the post-Revolution clashes with the Kurds in Kermanshah, such as in breaking the Siege of Paveh, and Kordestan provinces.

=== Iran–Iraq War ===
The Iran–Iraq War saw the most intensive use of helicopters in a conventional conflict ever. IRIAA flew more than 300,000 hours in direct support of the operations throughout the war, in addition to around 59,000 hours in training sorties, with an average of 100 hours of flight per day during the war.

During the initial months of the war, the Army Aviation, usually operating on its own and using intelligence from local people, managed to stop Iraqi tanks from advancing further into western Iran. This was usually done by using units of AH-1J SeaCobras and a Bell 206 JetRanger. Among the Iranians, the Cobras gained a reputation as good as those of the F-14 Tomcats and the F-4 Phantom II.

Iranian AH-1Js, particularly the TOW-capable ones, were "exceptionally effective" in anti-armour warfare, inflicting heavy losses on Iraqi armoured and vehicle formations. In operations over the barren terrain in Khuzestan and later in southern Iraq, beside the standard tactics, Iranian pilots developed special, effective tactics, often in the same manner as the Soviets did with their Mi-24s. Due to the post-Revolution weapons sanctions, Iranians equipped the AH-1Js with the AGM-65 Maverick missiles and used it in some operations with some success.

Starting from October 1980, the AH-1Js engaged in air-to-air combat with Iraqi Mil Mi-24 helicopters on several occasions during the Iran–Iraq War, the only war with confirmed "dogfights" between helicopters. The results of these engagements are disputed. One document cited that Iranian AH-1Js took on Iraqi Mi-8 and Mi-24 helicopters. Sources report that the Iranian AH-1 pilots achieved a 10:1 kill ratio over the Iraqi helicopter pilots during these engagements (1:5). One source states that 10 Iranian AH-1Js were lost in the war, compared to six lost Iraqi Mi-24s. The skirmishes are described as fairly evenly matched in another source.

The Mi-24 was more powerful and faster, but the AH-1J was more agile. There were even engagements between Iranian AH-1J and Iraqi fixed-wing aircraft. Using their 20 mm calibre canon, the AH-1Js scored three confirmed kills against MiG-21s, claimed a Su-20, and shared in the destruction of a MiG-23.

About half of the AH-1Js were lost during the conflict from combat, accidents, and simple wear and tear.

Ahmad Keshvari and Ali Akbar Shiroodi were two prominent pilots of the IRIAA, both of whom were killed in the Iran–Iraq War. December 7, the date of Ahmad Keshvari's death, is "Havānīrūz Day" on the Iranian Military calendar, and has been proposed by the Iranian Army to be added to the official Iranian calendar.

=== Contemporary ===
From 1979 to 2011, more than 800,000 flight hours were logged by the Havānīrūz. Many of the helicopters delivered before the Revolution need to be repaired and refurbished. The Iranian Helicopter Support and Renewal Company, IHSRC, also known as PANHA or Panha, was founded for this purpose. Iran Aircraft Manufacturing Industrial Company (HESA) is manufacturing new helicopters, usually based on those that Iran already has in its arsenal.

== Equipment ==
=== Current aircraft inventory ===
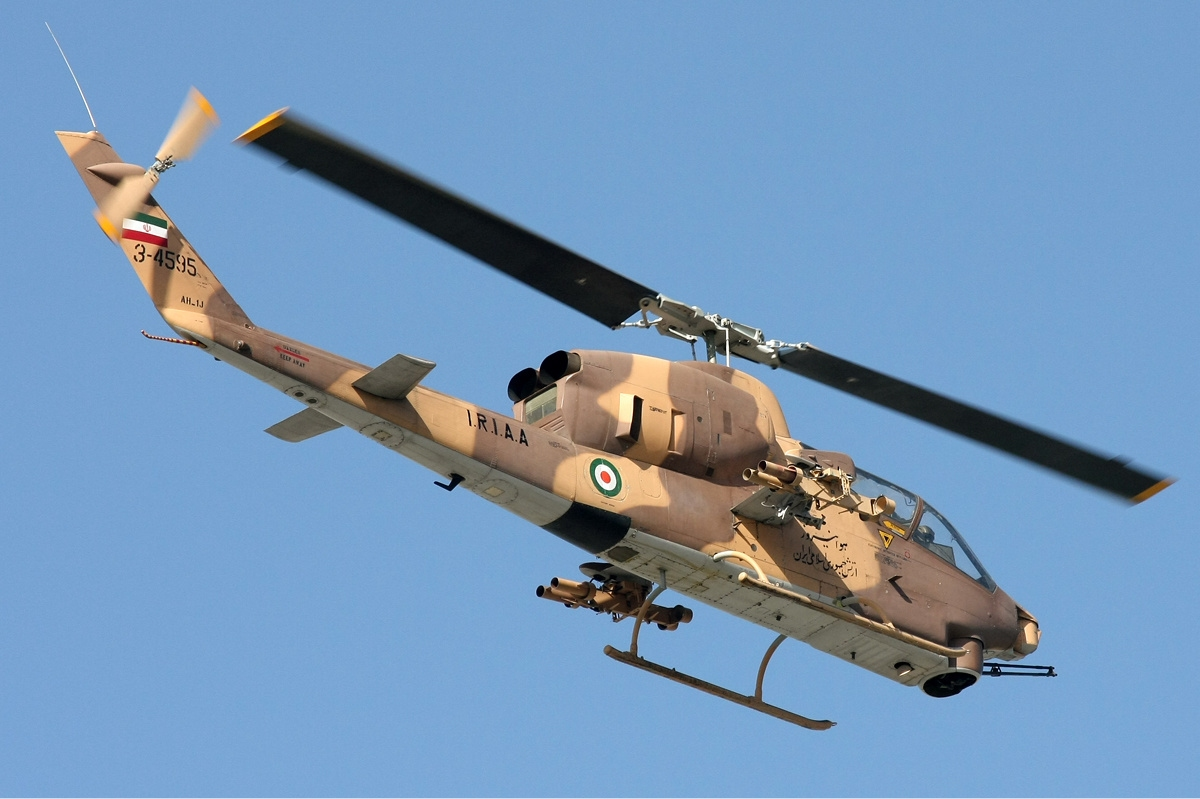
AH-1J International Cobra

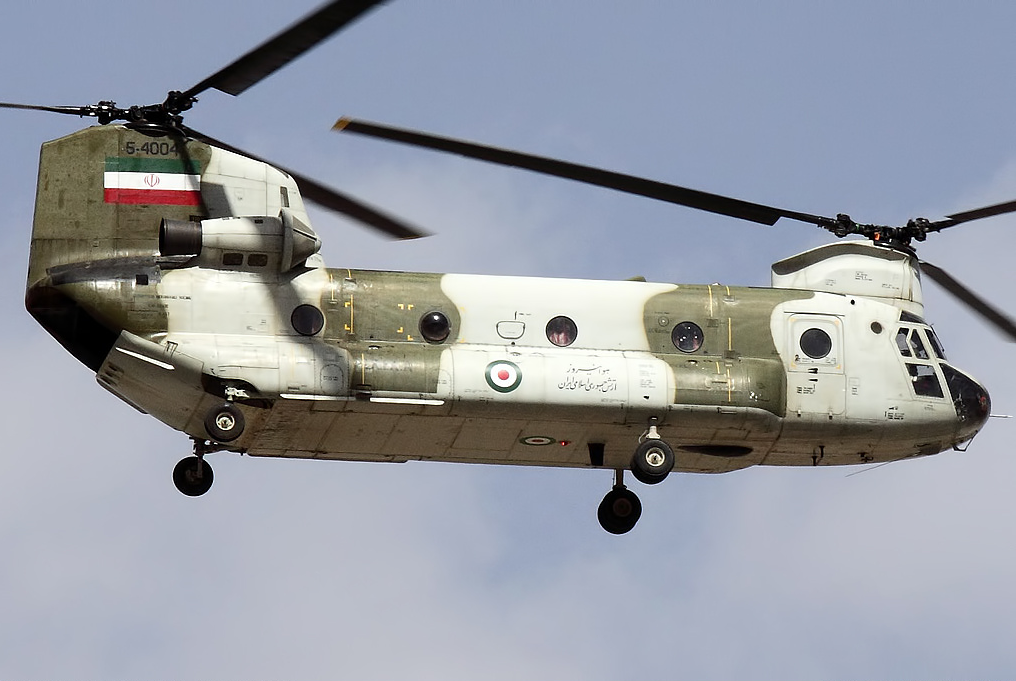
CH-47 Chinook

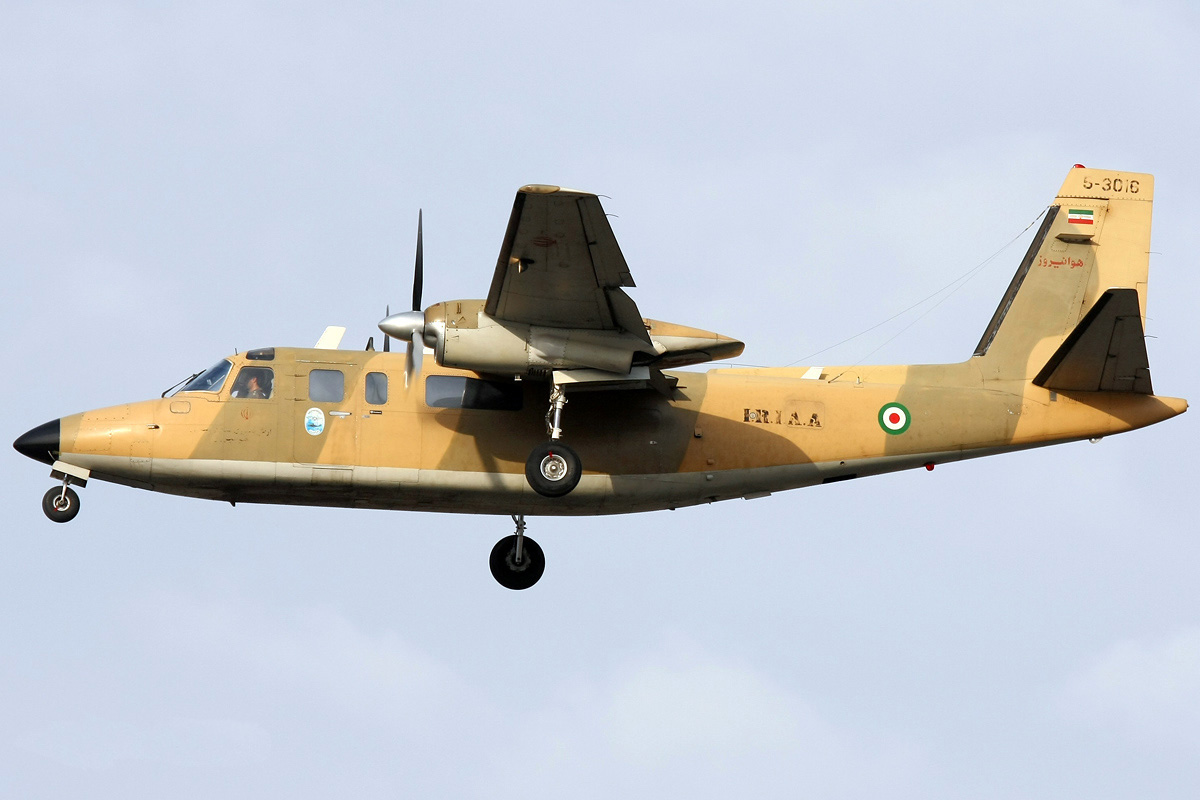
Aero Commander 690A

Aircraft	Origin	Type	Variant	In service	Notes
Airplanes
Fokker F27	Netherlands	Transport		1	
Turbo Commander	United States	Transport		3	
Helicopters
Mil Mi-28	Russia	Combat helicopter	Mil Mi-28NE	6	The deal to acquire an unspecified number of Mil Mi-28 helicopters by Iran was first announced in November 2023. A defense reporter for Iranian state-controlled Tasnim news agency reported arrival of Mil Mi-28NE attack helicopters in January 2026.
Bell AH-1	United States	Combat helicopter	AH-1J	40	
Bell 206	United States	Light transport		3	
Bell 214	United States	Medium transport		24	
Boeing CH-47	United States	Heavy transport	CH-47C	38	

== Accidents and incidents ==
- On 24 February 2026 a Bell AH-1J (Panha 2091 Toufan) of IRIAA crashed. 4 persons died and the aircraft was destroyed.

== Headquarters ==
- Isfahan Training Centre
- Kermanshah 1st Combat Base
- Masjed Soleiman 2nd Combat Base
- Kerman 3rd Combat Base
- Isfahan 4th Combat and Logistics Base
- Qaleh Morghi Logistics Base
- Havanirooz Mashhad Base
- Havanirooz Tabriz Base

== Organization ==
- Iran Aviation Industries Organization (IAIO)
  - Iran Aircraft Manufacturing Industrial Company (HESA)
  - Iranian Helicopter Support and Renewal Company (IHSRC, also known as PANHA)
