= List of aviation accidents and incidents in the war in Afghanistan =

The following is a list aviation accidents and incidents in the war in Afghanistan. It covers helicopters, fixed-wing aircraft and UAVs.

== 2021 ==
- August 15: During the fall of Kabul, 22 military planes and 24 helicopters of the Afghan Air Force fled over the border to Uzbekistan over the weekend, carrying 585 Afghan personnel, an Afghan Air Force Embraer 314 crashed in Uzbekistan's Surxondaryo Region. Two pilots ejected and landed with parachutes. Initially, the Prosecutor General's office in Uzbekistan issued a statement saying that an Afghan military plane had collided mid-air with an Uzbekistan Air Force MiG-29, however it retracted the statement about the mid-air collision later. Another two helicopters and three planes from Afghanistan carrying 143 military servicemen fled over the border with Tajikistan as well.
- July 29: An Afghan Army MD 500 helicopter crashed in Helmand province, Afghanistan. Both pilots survived.
- July 26: An Afghan Army Mi-17 helicopter crashed in Helmand province, Afghanistan. Nobody was hurt but the helicopter was subsequently destroyed.
- July 11: (2) Taliban announced the destruction of two Afghan UH-60 Blackhawk helicopters in Kunduz Airport following an infiltration attack later releasing images.
- June 20: An Afghan Army Mi-17 helicopter is lost in Kharwar base, Logar province.
- June 16: An Afghan Army UH-60A damaged by a hit on the ground with an SPG-9 while refueling in Ghazni at a local base.
- June 8: An Afghan Army Mi-17 helicopter was lost in Jaghatu district killing three and injuring one Afghan service member. The Taliban claimed the helicopter was shot down, as well as one Afghan official. Afghan authorities began an investigation on the event.
- May 10: An Afghan Army MD 500 helicopter crashed in Kandahar province injuring the occupants.
- April 1: A UH-60 Black Hawk helicopter of the Afghan Air Force was shot down in Nahri Saraj District of Helmand Province. Afghan Ministry of Defense confirmed the helicopter "crash landed", and acknowledged the death of three crew members.
- March 18: A Mi-17 helicopter of the Afghan Army was shot down by a local anti-taliban militia led by ethnic warlord Abdul Ghani Alipur in the Behsud district of Maidan Wardak. Nine members of the Afghan security forces died in the incident. Two days later a video appeared, showing the helicopter being hit while increasing altitude just after unloading troops and cargo. A missile hits the helicopter, clipping the tail boom, with the helicopter spinning out of control and crashing. The missile was claimed to be a "laser-guided weapon".

== 2020 ==
- November 11: An Afghan army helicopter, reportedly a Mi-17 crashed during takeoff in Hisarak district, Nangarhar province due to a technical failure. one crew member and one security personnel died, two others were wounded.
- (2) October 14: Two Afghan army Mi-17 helicopters collided while taking off in Nawa district, Helmand province. Nine Afghan service members died.
- September 26: An Afghan army MD-530F helicopter crashed in the city of Pul-e-Khumri due to a technical issue. Both pilots were killed.
- July 27: A Black Hawk helicopter of the Afghan army was shot down by the Taliban using an anti-tank guided missile, while the helicopter was landing in the province of Helmand.
- January 27: A United States Air Force E-11A was reported crashed in Afghanistan by US officials. The Taliban claimed it was shot down with all its occupants killed, which US officials denied. With the complete withdrawal of US forces from Afghanistan on 30 August 2021, this was the last acknowledged US fatal aviation loss of the war.

== 2019 ==
- November 20: A US AH-64D Apache helicopter crashed in Logar province, Afghanistan with initial reports mentioning that the rotor of the helicopter clipped a mountain ridge, ruling out enemy fire. Both crew members died in the crash. The Taliban claimed they shot it down, mentioning a different model, a Boeing CH-47 Chinook helicopter, downed in the eastern Logar province. The US denied the Taliban's claim.
- October 15: An Afghan army Mi-17 crashed due to technical faults on the outskirts of Mazar-i-Sharif. At least seven Afghan military personnel were killed in the crash.
- May 25: A CH-47F Chinook helicopter made a crash landing in Helmand Province, all onboard survived, but were injured. The helicopter was totally destroyed.

== 2018 ==
- October 30: An Afghan army helicopter, probably a Mi-17, crashed in the Farah province in bad weather in the western Farah province, killing all 25 on board, including senior officials. At the time of the crash it was reported as being the eighth Afghan military helicopter crash in 2018.

== 2017 ==
- October 27: A Boeing CH-47 Chinook helicopter of the 160th SOAR (A) crashed after hitting a tree after taking troops for a night raid to Kharwar District in Logar Province. One soldier died and six were injured.
- mid May: An Afghan army Mi-17 was destroyed by an improvised explosive device, as it landed on a hilltop outpost in an attack similar to the one on the previous year. The video was released by the Taliban at the end of May.

== 2016 ==
- March 29: A USAF F-16CM fighter jet crashed just after takeoff at Bagram airbase at 20:30 local time after suffering an engine failure. The pilot ejected safely.
- March 24: An Afghan army Mi-17 was destroyed by an improvised explosive device, as it landed on a hilltop outpost in the Nari district in Kunar. The video was released by the Taliban in mid April.

== 2015 ==
- October 11: A Westland Puma HC Mk 2 helicopter crashed while attempting to land at the NATO Resolute Support HQ in Kabul, killing 5 of the 10 people on board. Among the casualties were two British and two US airmen, as well as a French civilian contractor.
- October 2: A C-130J operated by Dyess Air Force Base, stationed at Bagram Airfield, crashed immediately after takeoff at Jalalabad Airfield killing all 6 airmen and 5 defense contractors on board, along with two people on the ground.

== 2014 ==
- May 31: One US CH-53 Sea Stallion was destroyed in a hard landing, the crew survived.
- May 28: One US Army crew member died when a UH-60M Black Hawk helicopter crash in southern Afghanistan. The helicopter crashed when it hit a cellphone tower in the Marouf district of Kandahar province. Thirteen crew members were injured.
- April 26: Five British service members were killed when a British Westland Lynx helicopter crashed in southern Afghanistan on Saturday, the NATO-led coalition forces and the British Ministry of Defense said. The crash was probably caused by loss of situational awareness and controlled flight into terrain but the military investigation did rule out technical failure or enemy action.
- January 10: Two US service members and a contractor pilot died near Bagram Air Base when a Beechcraft RC-12 Guardrail crashed.

== 2013 ==
- December 17: Six U.S. Army service members were killed when their UH-60 Black Hawk crashed in southern Afghanistan (near Zabul province) after damage from an improvised explosive device while in low level flight, according to U.S. and NATO officials. One person on board the aircraft was injured and survived.
- September 25: An Afghan army MD-530F helicopter was destroyed by an improvised explosive device, as it landed on a hilltop outpost during a training sortie near Shindand air base. The helicopter was crewed by an Afghan student pilot and his American instructor, both wounded.
- June 11: A NATO-led International Security Assistance Force (ISAF) helicopter made an emergency landing in southern Kandahar province of Afghanistan.
- May 19: A USAF C-130J Super Hercules crashed coming from Kandahar on a medical evacuation mission. It slammed hard onto Shank's runway, smashing its right wing and outboard engine nacelle.
- May 3: A US Boeing KC-135 Stratotanker aircraft of the USAF crashed in Kyrgyzstan on shortly after takeoff. The three crew members were killed in the crash.
- April 29: National Airlines Flight 102 was a cargo flight operated by National Airlines between the British military base Camp Bastion in Afghanistan and Al Maktoum Airport in Dubai, with a refueling stop at Bagram Airfield, Afghanistan. On 29 April 2013, the Boeing 747-400 operating the flight crashed moments after taking off from Bagram, killing all seven people on board.
- April 27: A USAF MC-12 Liberty aircraft crashed in Shahjoi district of Zabul province, about 110 miles (180 kilometers) northeast of Kandahar Air Field, killing four coalition troops.
- April 9: A U.S. AH-64 Apache helicopter crashed in Pachir Agam district of Nangarhar province of eastern Afghanistan killing two US soldiers.
- April 3: A US F-16 fighter crashed near Bagram Airfield in eastern Afghanistan's Parwan province killing a US military pilot.
- March 16: A US OH-58 Kiowa crashed in Daman District of Kandahar Province, killing one US soldier and injuring another
- March 11: A Sikorsky UH-60 Black Hawk helicopter crashed in the Daman district of Kandahar Province killing five American soldiers.
- February 7: A US OH-58 Kiowa helicopter crashed in eastern Afghanistan, but no crew members were seriously injured.

== 2012 ==
- October 1: A US CH-47 Chinook helicopter crashed in Zabul province in southern Afghanistan.
- September 15: One C-130 Hercules was lost and six USMC VMA-211 AV-8B Harrier II fighter jets were destroyed and two damaged beyond repair while parked on the ground during an attack on Camp Bastion. One AV-8B Harrier II was repaired and returned to service. This became the worst U.S. aircraft loss in one day since the Vietnam War. Two Marines of the VMA-211, one of them a Lieutenant Colonel and one a Sergeant attached from MALS-13, were killed in the attack.
- September 10: Three members of the Afghan National Security Forces were killed and US CH-47 Chinook was destroyed on Bagram Airfield according to NATO officials.
- September 5: A US OH-58 Kiowa crashed in the Babus area of Logar district. Two US servicemen died in the accident.
- August 29: A US Bell UH-1Y Venom of HMLA-369 helicopter crashed in Helmand province, killing two Australian soldiers.
- August 27: A US CH-47 Chinook helicopter made a hard landing in the eastern province of Logar. The aircraft was heavily damaged, so the crew destroyed it before they were evacuated from the scene.
- August 16: A US Army Sikorsky UH-60 Black Hawk helicopter went down during a firefight in Shah Wali Kot District, Khandahar province. Seven American servicemen and four Afghan nationals died in the crash.
- July 18: A US Army Sikorsky UH-60 Black Hawk helicopter crashed in the area of the military operation southwest of Chaghcharan, injuring two troops serving with the U.S.-led military coalition according to NATO.
- June 22: An Australian Army CH-47D Chinook helicopter was badly damaged after a hard landing in Kandahar province. The damaged helicopter was evacuated to the Kandahar airbase and written off.
- June 21: A US helicopter crashed in Khost province in southeast Afghanistan.
- June 6: A US OH-58 Kiowa crashed in Ghazni province, killing both servicemen.
- May 28: A US Army AH-64 Apache crashed in Wardak Province during a routine patrol. No enemy activity was reported in the area. Both crew members were killed in the crash.
- May 28: A US Army Sikorsky UH-60 Black Hawk helicopter crashed in Paktika Province. Multiple injured, successful MEDEVAC no deaths.
- April 19: A US Army Sikorsky UH-60 Black Hawk helicopter was shot down in Helmand province. At least four US troops were killed after the helicopter crashed in southern Afghanistan.
- March 16: A Turkish Army Sikorsky UH-60 Black Hawk helicopter crashed in Kabul, killing all twelve Turkish soldiers and two Afghan interpreters on board in addition to three civilians on the ground.
- February 6: A US Army AH-64 Apache helicopter crashed with no casualties. A video of the incident was released six weeks later on internet.
- January 19: A US CH-53 Sea Stallion helicopter crashed in southern Afghanistan, killing six Marines.

== 2011 ==
- September 28: A US AH-1W SuperCobra helicopter crashed on take-off in Helmand province killing one Marine.
- August 8: A US CH-47 helicopter made a hard landing in Paktia province. There were no fatalities.
- August 6: A US CH-47 Chinook helicopter being flown by the 7th Battalion, 158th Aviation Regiment and 2nd Battalion, 135th Aviation Regiment was shot down by an RPG killing 30 American and eight Afghan soldiers. Some of the casualties were from The US Navy's SEAL Team Six
- July 25: A CH-47 Chinook was shot down by an RPG near Camp Nangalam in Kunar Province. Two coalition service members were injured.
- June 24: A NATO helicopter made a hard landing in Helmand.

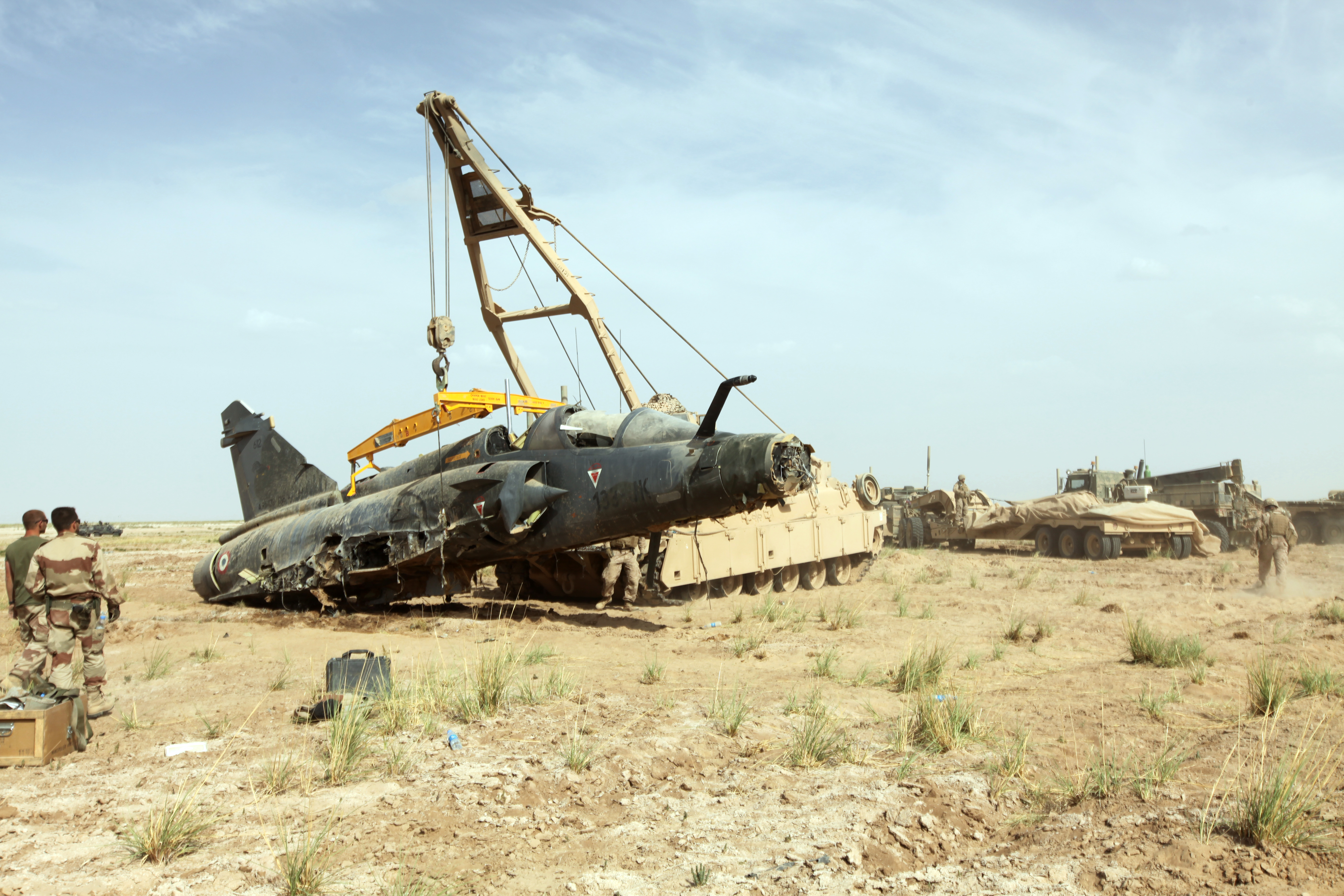
An M88 hoists the fuselage of a downed French Mirage 2000D on May 27, 2011, in the Bakwa district

- June 15: An Afghan army Mil Mi-17 crashed in the Kunar province injuring six.
- June 12: A Polish Land Forces Mil Mi-24V was destroyed after crashing at the Warrior base in Ghazni province. The loss was recorded in video.
- June 10: A French Army Aérospatiale Gazelle crashed about 20 kilometres (12 mi) from Bagram in the north of the country in difficult weather conditions. One person died, the pilot was seriously injured
- June 5: A US OH-58 Kiowa helicopter crashed in the Sabari district of the eastern province of Khost, with the Taliban claiming to have shot the aircraft down. Two US service members were killed.
- May 30: An Australian Army CH-47D Chinook helicopter crashed in Zabul Province 90 km east of Tarin Kowt. The Chinook caught fire after impact, and one of the passengers on board the aircraft later died from injuries sustained in the crash. Five other Australians on board the chopper suffered minor injuries.
- May 26: A US AH-64D Longbow helicopter crashed in Paktika Province. One crew member was killed in the incident.
- May 24: A NATO chopper crashed in western Afghanistan, no victims were reported.
- May 24: A French Air Force Dassault Mirage 2000D crashed 100 kilometers west of Farah. Both crew members successfully ejected and were rescued.
- May 15: A Canadian CH-47D Chinook turned on its side as it landed. Four Canadian soldiers were injured during a "hard landing" on a river bed in Afghanistan.
- May 11: An Afghan army Mi-17 crashed in the Nuristan province after hitting a tree, injuring nine soldiers.
- April 23: A US OH-58 Kiowa helicopter went down after being shot by a RPG in Kapisa province, northeast of the capital Kabul. One crew member was killed.
- February 5: A French Army Eurocopter Tiger crashed in Afghanistan's eastern district of Lateh Band near the capital Kabul.
- January 26: A Polish Land Forces Mil Mi-24V rolled over on its side and burned out after experiencing mechanical trouble during takeoff from a military base in Ghazni district of Ghazni province.

== 2010 ==
- November 28: A French Navy Dassault Rafale fighter crashed off Pakistan after its pilot parachuted to safety. The Rafale was operating from the aircraft carrier Charles de Gaulle, which at the time was supporting NATO operations in Afghanistan.
- November 3: A French Army Aérospatiale Gazelle crashed in Nijrab province. Both pilots escaped unhurt.
- October 12: A US Army CH-47 Chinook helicopter had just landed and had been off-loading when an RPG was fired into the cargo ramp. An Afghan interpreter was killed and seven ISAF servicemembers and an Afghan Border Police officer were injured.
- September 21: A US Army UH-60 Blackhawk crashed in southern Afghanistan, killing 9 US soldiers. Cause of the crash was unknown but the Taliban have claimed to have shot it down. The helicopter was taking part of a Special Operations mission. One Afghan Army soldier and one US civilian were wounded.
- August 19: Eight service members belonging to the NATO-led International Security Assistance Force (ISAF) were injured when their helicopter made a hard landing in southern Afghanistan.
- August 10: A British RAF CH-47D Chinook crashed in Helmand province in southern Afghanistan. "The helicopter due to technical problems crashed in Gereshk district at 04:00 a.m. local time, as a result one soldier sustained injury and died," spokesman for provincial administration Daud Ahmadi told Xinhua. Meanwhile, a NATO source with press department in southern region confirmed the incident, saying it was a hard landing and all four aboard were rescued safe and sound.
- August 5: A Canadian CH-47D Chinook was shot down in Kandahar Province, Afghanistan. It made a hard landing and burned out on the ground, wounding eight soldiers.
- July 26: A US CH-47 Chinook helicopter crashed in Pul-e-Charkhi area east of the capital city of Kabul. Two NATO troops were killed.
- July 22: A US AH-1W SuperCobra was shot down in Helmand province, killing two US servicemen.
- June 23: A British RAF Mk3 Merlin made a heavy landing at a forward operating base in the Lashkar Gar area of Helmand province. No-one was seriously injured and the incident was determined to be a non-hostile event. A U.S. Marine Corps CH-53E from HMH-466 was used to recover the aircraft and transport it to Camp Bastion.
- June 21: A US Army UH-60 Blackhawk crashed in northern Kandahar Province, killing three Australian Commandos and the US crew chief, and injuring another seven Australians and a US crewman.
- June 9: A Sikorsky HH-60 Pave Hawk CSAR helicopter was shot down in Helmand province, killing five American airmen.
- May 21: A Westland Sea King carrying five troops was hit by an RPG and crash-landed in Nad-e Ali, Helmand Province. The five were injured but not seriously.
- May 14: A US helicopter made a hard landing in Kandahar Province causing injuries to several coalition and Afghan military personnel. It was destroyed on the site by ISAF members to prevent it from falling into insurgents' hands
- May 10: A US UH-60 Black Hawk made a controlled landing after being hit by enemy fire in Helmand Province. All crewmembers were safely returned to the base. The helicopter was destroyed by international forces.
- April 9: A US Air Force CV-22 Osprey crashed near Qalat, Zabul Province, killing three US service members and one government contractor. This is the first combat loss of an Osprey.
- March 31: A US Navy E-2 Hawkeye surveillance plane stationed with the USS Dwight D. Eisenhower crashed in the Arabian sea at approximately 2 p.m. local time while returning from an operational flight conducted as part of Operation Enduring Freedom. The one U.S. crew member presumed missing was declared dead and three were rescued.
- March 28: A US Army UH-60 Black Hawk crashed in Zabul province in southern Afghanistan. Fourteen ISAF and Afghan service members were injured.
- March 23: A Turkish Army UH-60 Black Hawk helicopter experienced technical problems as it tried to land at a base in Maidan Shar, the capital of Wardak province. It hit a hill as it was coming down and rolled over.

== 2009 ==
- December 11: A USAF HH-60G Pave Hawk crash landed after receiving heavy machine gun fire in an LZ and was forced to land two miles away from where they took off. The aircraft was later destroyed. The co-pilot suffered minor injuries.
- December 3: A Polish Land Forces Mi-24V Hind attack helicopter was damaged after making an emergency autorotation landing immediately after taking off from Ghazni airfield in Afghanistan. The crew and passengers were not seriously injured.
- October 26: A US MH-47 Chinook crashed in Badghis province, in western Afghanistan reportedly due to low visibility caused by "thick dust stirred up" during takeoff at night, killing seven US servicemen and three US Drug Enforcement Administration agents. 14 Afghan and 11 American servicemen and one US DEA agent were injured.
- October 26: A USMC UH-1N helicopter collided with an AH-1W SuperCobra over southern Afghanistan, killing four US Marines and injuring two.
- October 13: A US Army C-12 Huron twin-engine turboprop crashed in Nuristan province. Its remnants were discovered on October 19, with three bodies of American civilian personnel.
- October 8: An Afghan National Army Air Corps Antonov An-32 S/N 354 crashed on landing in Southwestern Afghanistan.
- August 30: A CH-47 Chinook(S/N ZA673) suffered a hard landing and was badly damaged in the Sangin area of Helmand province. The four crew and 15 soldiers from the 2 Rifles battlegroup were unharmed.
- August 20: A British CH-47 Chinook (S/N ZA709) was shot down in the Sangin area of Helmand province. The crew survived.
- July 31: A Polish Land Forces Mi-24V Hind attack helicopter was destroyed, on route to Ghazni from Kabul it was hit by heavy machine gun fire and forced to make a hard landing.
- July 20: A British Royal Air Force GR4 Tornado fighter jet crashed at Kandahar air base during takeoff at 7:20 a.m. The two pilots were injured after ejecting from the aircraft.
- July 18: A U.S. Air Force F-15E Strike Eagle fighter jet crashed in central Afghanistan, killing the two crew members.
- July 7: A Canadian CH-146 Griffon crashed in Zabul, Afghanistan, killing three coalition soldiers.
- May 22: A NATO helicopter crashed near Tarin Kowt in Uruzgan Province. One crew member was killed in the incident.
- May 14: A British Harrier GR9 jet crash landed at Kandahar airfield at about 10:30am local time. The pilot suffered only minor injuries when he ejected from the aircraft. There were no other casualties.
- January 17: A US CH-47 Chinook helicopter crashed in eastern Afghanistan. Small arms fire was involved. One US soldier was killed in the incident.
- January 15: An Afghan army Mi-17 crashed in the Adraskan District of Herat province, killing all thirteen on board, including General Fazaludin Sayar, the regional commander in charge of the western part of Afghanistan. The government declared the crash was due to bad weather, while the Taliban claimed to have shot the helicopter down.

== 2008 ==
- October 27: A US helicopter was shot down in Wardak Province, with no fatalities.
- October 21: A United States Navy P-3 Orion reconnaissance and intelligence aircraft overshot the runway at Bagram Air Base while landing. The aircraft caught fire and was destroyed but the only injury to the crew was one broken ankle. The aircraft was from PATWING 5 from Naval Air Station Brunswick and was assigned to CTF-57 in Afghanistan.
- September 11: The pilot of a US OH-58 Kiowa, CW4 Michael Slebodnik, died of wounds after being shot in the leg while on a route recon mission in Laghman province. The co-pilot flew the undamaged aircraft to COP Najil and the pilot was flown by a UH-60 MEDEVAC to Bagram Airfield.
- September 4: A British Army Air Corps Apache AH1 crashed shortly after takeoff in Helmand province. Both crew members were unhurt.
- July 2: A US UH-60 Black Hawk helicopter was shot down by RPG and small arms fire south of the Afghan capital in the Logar province. The pilots were able to land the aircraft and evacuate everyone on board before it caught fire, another helicopter returned later and destroyed the wreckage with precision fire.
- July 1: A US CH-46 Sea Knight suffered a mishap and was lost near the British Forward Operating Base Dwyer in Afghanistan south.
- June 25: A US-led coalition forces helicopter crashed in northeastern province of Kunar in Afghanistan, causing minor injuries to two soldiers on board.
- June 17: A US CH-47 Chinook helicopter crashed in Nuristan province and slid over a ravine, the damaged helicopter was subsequently destroyed by ISAF.
- June 5: A US OH-58 Kiowa crashed at Kandahar Army Airfield, Afghanistan during a test flight killing the maintenance pilot and his crew chief. They were assigned to the 96th Aviation Support Battalion, 101st Combat Aviation Brigade.

== 2007 ==
- December 10: An Afghan army Mi-17 helicopter crashed in heavy fog about 70 kilometres southwest of Kabul, killing four soldiers.
- September 25: A Spanish AS332 Super Puma helicopter suffered an accident during a Medivac mission to evacuate Afghan police wounded by a roadside bomb in the western province of Badghis, the craft was destroyed.
- August 21: An Italian AB-212 helicopter crashed while attempting an emergency landing due to technical problems. Three Italian soldiers were wounded.
- August 13: Two AH-64D attack helicopters were lost in Paktia province crashing in the same mountain. The crew was wounded with minor injuries.
- August 10: A US CH-47 Chinook, serial number 83-24123 was badly damaged when hit the propeller of another CH-47 Chinook, the helicopter was later written off.
- May 30: A US CH-47 Chinook was shot down in the upper Sangin valley, killing five American, one British and one Canadian soldiers. Until July 25, 2010, its downing was officially attributed to small arms and a rocket-propelled grenade. It became clear that it was downed by a MANPADS as the Coalition forces generally downplayed or even denied any SAM attack by Taliban insurgents.
- February 18: A US CH-47 Chinook from 2–160th SOAR carrying 22 U.S. servicemen crashed in Zabul Province, killing eight and injuring fourteen.

== 2006 ==
- September 2: A British Nimrod MR.2 aircraft caught fire after in-flight refueling, exploded and crashed near Kandahar, killing fourteen crewmembers.
- August 31: A Dutch F-16A Block 15 MLU fighter crashed near Ghazni, killing the pilot. The crash remains unexplained, investigators later suggested that a venomous spider in the cockpit could have caused the pilot to panic and lose control of the aircraft.
- July 11: A US CH-47 Chinook came under fire and made an emergency landing in Helmand province, due to the damage the airframe was destroyed by an airstrike.
- July 2: A US AH-64 Apache out of Kandahar air base crashed, killing one pilot, CW3 William Timothy Flanigan, and injuring the other.
- May 24: A Special Forces RAF Hercules, caught fire after setting down at a landing strip outside the town of Lashkar Gah in Helmand Province. The plane was carrying the new British ambassador, in Afghanistan, Stephen Evans. No casualties were reported.
- May 5: A US CH-47 Chinook helicopter crashed in the mountains of eastern Afghanistan, killing all ten U.S. soldiers on board.
- April 28: A US AH-64 Apache helicopter crashed north of Qalat, Afghanistan. The pilot survived with minor injuries, while the co-pilot/gunner had his right arm amputated.

== 2005 ==
- (3) December 4: Three CH-47 Chinook helicopters, were lost in Afghanistan, serial number 91-00269 was destroyed by small arms fire, 50 miles north of Kandahar, Afghanistan. There were two injuries on 91–00269. other CH-47 Chinook of unknown serial number made an emergency landing in Forward Operating Base south of Tarin Kowt, Uruzgan province. The third caught fire and was destroyed.
- October 31: A Dutch CH-47D Chinook helicopter, D-104, made a hard landing after losing power in cruise flight. There were several injuries and the aircraft was destroyed by Dutch troops after salvaging usable parts.
- October 14: An RAF Harrier GR7A was destroyed and another was damaged in a rocket attack by Taliban forces while parked on the tarmac at Kandahar. No one was injured in the attack. The damaged Harrier was repaired at the airfield while the destroyed one was replaced by another fighter which flew out from Britain on the same evening.
- October 7: A US MH-47D helicopter, serial number 89-00160 crashed in Kumar province while landing in a combat zone, the helicopter rolled over and was destroyed.
- September 25: Five US soldiers were killed when a CH-47 Chinook helicopter, serial number 90-00200 was shot down in Zabul province while returning from an operation. Though initially reported as an accident, the loss was later confirmed to have been caused by hostile fire.
- (2) August 16: Seventeen Spanish soldiers were killed when their Cougar AS532 helicopter crashed near Herat. A second Spanish helicopter made an emergency landing, injuring five soldiers.
- July 29: A US AH-64 Apache helicopter crashed near Bagram airbase. The crew survived.
- July 27: A Dutch Army CH-47 Chinook helicopter rolled and crashed during a night mission in Afghanistan.
- June 28: A US CH-47 Chinook helicopter was shot down in Kunar province by Taliban commander Qari Ismail, killing all sixteen US Special Operations servicemen on board. The US military said it was shot down by a rocket-propelled grenade. The helicopter was on a rescue mission for Operation Red Wings, a team of four SEAL members pinned down by Taliban gunmen.
- June 22: A U-2 spy plane crashed at Al Dhafra Air Base in the UAE, returning from a mission in Afghanistan, killing the pilot.
- April 6: A US CH-47 Chinook helicopter crashed in a sandstorm near Ghazni, killing all aboard (fourteen American soldiers, one marine and three civilian contractors)

== 2004 ==
- December 16: A US OH-58 Kiowa crashed north of Shindand, in Afghanistan's Herat province, injuring its two pilots.
- October 20: A HH-60 Pave Hawk N87-26014 crashed during a med-evac injuring four on board and killing one.
- August 29: A Dutch AH-64D Longbow, designation Q-20, crashed near Kabul, slightly injuring one crew member.
- August 12: A UH-60 Black Hawk crashed in Khost province, killing one soldier and injuring fourteen.
- June 28: The crew of an AH-64D Apache helicopter escaped with minor injuries after being forced to make an emergency landing north of Qalat. The aircraft caught on fire and was completely destroyed.
- April 26: A CH-46 Sea Knight helicopter crashed because of loss of lift power amid a duststorm. The helicopter was later decommissioned and dismantled.

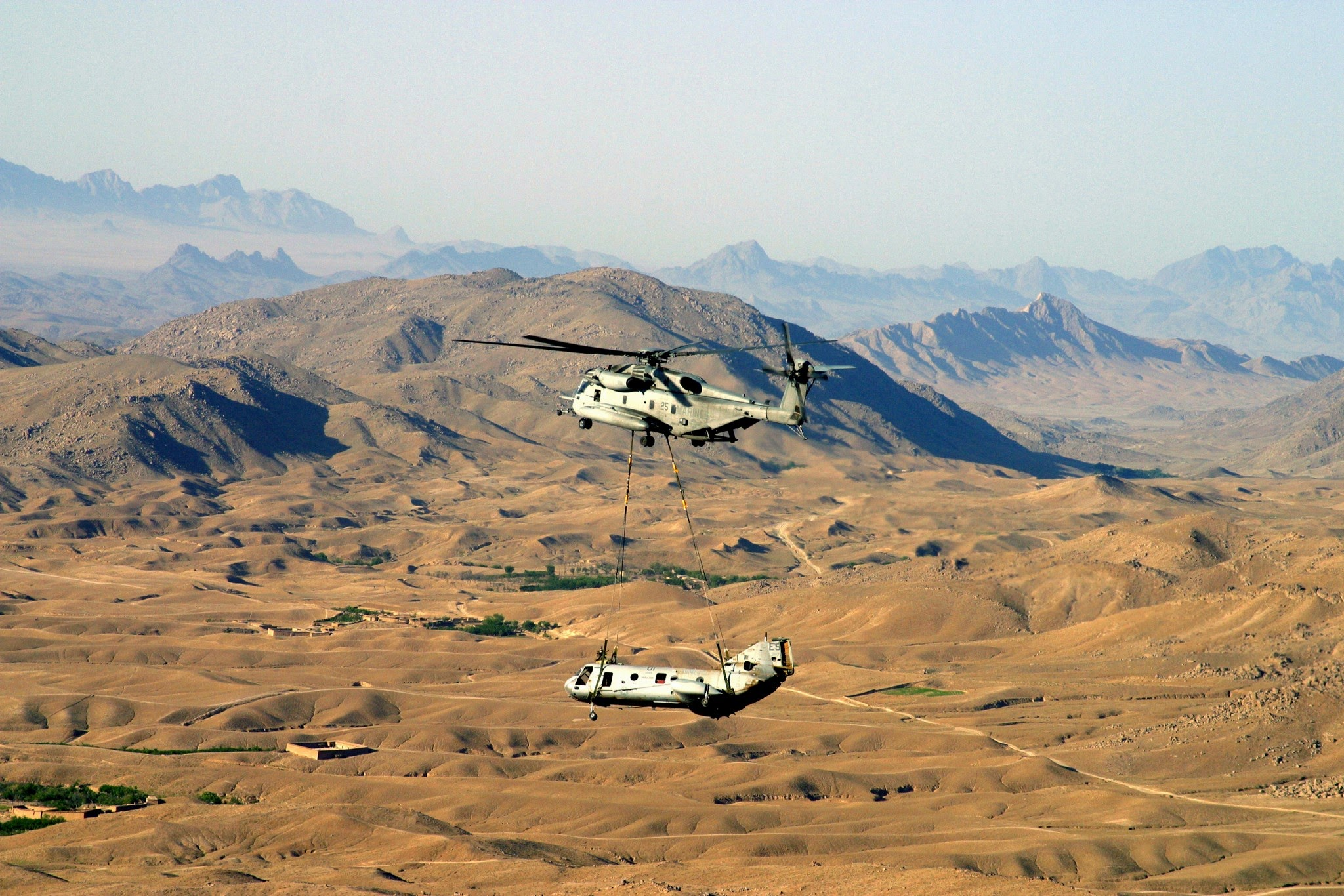
A CH-53E from HMH-461, attached to HMM-266, conducts a TRAP of a downed CH-46 in Afghanistan during the 2004 22 MEU deployment.

== 2003 ==
- November 23: A MH-53 Pave Low helicopter crashed shortly after leaving Bagram Air Base, killing five US soldiers and leaving seven wounded.
- June 3: A US AH-64 Apache helicopter (N 89–0258) crashed near Urgun Paktika Province. The crew survived.
- April 24: A US CH-47 Chinook helicopter (N 90–00217) crashed near Spin Boldak, the crew survived, but the remains of the helicopter were subsequently destroyed.
- March 23: A HH-60 Pave Hawk Komodo 11 crashed in Afghanistan, killing six on board.
- January 30: US Army UH-60L Black Hawk helicopter of the 160th SOAR (A) crashed near the Afghan capital, Kabul, killing all four crew members. The US military said the Black Hawk transport helicopter came down near Bagram air base

== 2002 ==
- December 21: A German CH-53 helicopter crashed in Kabul, killing seven German soldiers.
- December 19: A F-16A Block 20 MLU fighter overran a runway at Bagram airbase and landed about 500 meters away in a mine field. The Danish Air Force pilot was evacuated to a US Army hospital. The F-16A was recovered, repaired and returned to service.
- August 13: (2) A US AH-64 Apache helicopter crashed about 20 miles south of Kabul. The crew survived. Another helicopter, a HH-60 was also reported lost the same day.
- June 12: A MC-130H Combat Talon crashed in eastern Afghanistan, killing three of the ten service members aboard.
- April 11: An AH-64 Apache crash-landed outside of Kandahar.
- March 18: A MH-53 Pave Low crashed during landing near Uruzgan province, three US servicemen suffered injuries. The helicopter suffered significant damage and was declared damaged beyond repair.
- March 4: (2) Two CH-47 Chinook helicopters were hit by RPGs and gunfire during Operation Anaconda. Two were killed in the first helicopter, which was dropping off a SEAL team. The second Chinook came in later that day to try to rescue the crew of the first CH-47, and subsequently was shot down, killing four.
- February 13: A MC-130P Shadow crashed in eastern Afghanistan. There were no casualties.
- January 28: A CH-47 Chinook serial number 84-24174 crashed in eastern Afghanistan due to a brownout, injuring sixteen soldiers.
- January 20: A CH-53E from HMM-361 crashed 40 miles south of Bagram air base killing two Marines on board.
- January 9: A KC-130 Hercules from VMGR-352 tanker crashed into a Pakistani mountain, killing seven Americans on board.

== 2001 ==
- December 12: A US B-1 Lancer bomber returning from a mission over Afghanistan crashed 30 miles north of Diego Garcia. All four crew members ejected safely.
- December 6: A UH-1 Iroquois crashed during takeoff Camp Rhino south of Kandahar, 2 US soldiers were slightly injured.
- November 20: A UH-60 Blackhawk crashed in Afghanistan, the damaged helicopter was later destroyed in the ground by US forces.
- November 2: A MH-53 crashed in Afghanistan, four servicemen were wounded in the crash. The airframe remains were later destroyed by F-14 aircraft.
- October 19: A UH-60 Black Hawk crashed at Dalbandin air base in Pakistan, killing two U.S. Army rangers. The cause was a brownout from dust kicked up by the helicopter rotor.

== Contract aircraft, non-military aircraft losses ==
- (Moldova) September 2, 2018: A Moldavian "Valan International Cargo Charter" Mi-8MTV helicopter crashed in Mazar-i-Sharif. Two crew members and ten Afghan soldiers were killed.
- May 18, 2016: An An-12 cargo plane carrying NATO troop supplies crashed on runway when it was attempting to land at Camp Dwyer, Afghanistan. Seven crew members were killed (five citizens of Azerbaijan, one citizen of Uzbekistan and one citizen of Ukraine).
- April 29, 2013: National Airlines Flight 102, A Boeing Boeing 747-400BCF operated by National Air Cargo under contract for NATO forces en route to Dubai, United Arab Emirates crashed shortly after takeoff from Bagram Air Base in Afghanistan. Seven crew members were killed.
- (Armenia) October 19, 2012: An An-12B cargo plane contracted by the U.S. military crashed at Shindand Air Base in Afghanistan and was destroyed along with 4,700 pounds of mail inbound to Afghanistan.
- (Russia) October 15, 2012: A Mi-8 helicopter belonging to the United Nations (UN) went down in the Yakawolang district of Bamyan province, which is located in the central region of Afghanistan. Seven UN employees, including two foreigners and five Afghan nationals, were injured in the crash.
- July 4, 2012: A Mi-8 helicopter under contract for NATO forces crashed in Afghanistan while taking off on the runway of the Afghan town of Ghazni. The flight mechanic, a citizen of Russia was killed in the accident.
- February 11, 2012: A Mi-8MTV-1 helicopter under contract for NATO forces crashed in southern Afghanistan and at least four people on board were killed. The aircraft, owned by the Kabul-based logistics company "Supreme Group" and crewed by four Tajik civilians, went down somewhere in the west of Zabul province.
- January 16, 2012: A Bell 214 helicopter under contract for NATO forces crashed and burst in flames in Nadali district near Shora area of southern Helmand province. All three people on board were killed.
- July 6, 2011: An IL-76TD cargo plane, registered 4K-AZ55, was destroyed in an accident near Bagram Air Base, Afghanistan. The plane flew into the side of a mountain at about 12,500 feet (3,800 meters). The aircraft belonged to "Silk Way Airlines". The transport plane carried a total of 18 tons of cargo for the NATO-led forces at Bagram Air Base. All nine crew members died in accident (three of them were citizens of Azerbaijan).
- October 12, 2010: A L-100-30 Lockheed Hercules (Leased from Transafrik Registration 5X-TUC) cargo plane crashed in a fireball and plummeted into a mountain crevice near the Afghan capital. Eight crew members (six Filipinos, one Indian and one Kenyan) were killed.
- July 28, 2010: An Antonov An-12 cargo plane crash-landed in Helmand Province. There were no injuries. The aircraft was destroyed.
- June 4, 2010: A L-100-30 Lockheed Hercules (Leased from Transafrik Registration S9-BAT) sustained substantial damage in a landing accident at Sharana AB, Afghanistan. The airplane came to rest beside the runway. The number 4 propeller separated from the engine, and the undercarriage was pushed up into the wheel wells.
- (Kazakhstan) May 30, 2010: A Mi-8 contract helicopter made a hard landing in the Jaji district of Paktiya Province. A civilian on the ground was killed when he was struck by debris. Three crew members received minor injuries.
- May 2, 2010: A Mi-8 helicopter (EX-40008) under contract for NATO forces in Afghanistan crashed during emergency landing at FOB Kalagush, Nuristan. Crewmembers were injured during the incident.
- April 25, 2010: A Bell 214 helicopter under contract for NATO forces made an emergency landing in the Farah Province due to mechanical problems suffered during flight. No one was injured during the incident. The helicopter caught fire after the crewmembers and passengers left the helicopter. The helicopter was deemed unrecoverable due to fire damage.
- (Turkey) March 1, 2010: An Airbus A300 cargo plane operating for DHL Airways leased from ACT Airlines, reportedly registered TC-ACB, suffered a landing mishap at Bagram Air Base. It came to rest on the left runway shoulder of Runway 03, approximately 500 ft north of Taxiway Charlie and just south of the "3000 feet remaining" distance marker. The airplane suffered a collapse of the left hand, main undercarriage.
- (United Arab Emirates) November 23, 2009: A Mi-8 helicopter under contract for NATO forces crashed in eastern Logar province. Three Ukrainians were killed in the crash. Helicopter belonged to Air Freight Aviation (UAE).
- July 19, 2009: A Mi-8 helicopter under contract for NATO forces in Afghanistan crashed at Kandahar air base, killing sixteen people and wounding five others. The helicopter belonged to Vertikal-T (Russia).
- (Moldova) July 14, 2009: A Mi-26 helicopter was shot down in Afghanistan, killing the six Ukrainian crewmembers. The aircraft belonged to Pecotox Air, a Moldovan aviation firm.
- February 14, 2008: A Kazakhstan registered (UN-76020) IL-76 operated by Asia Continental Airlines was damaged beyond repair after an engine fire in Kandahar Airport.
- December 3, 2006: A Mi-26 helicopter under contract with Dyncorp, a US security company, crashed, killing eight Russian crewmembers. The helicopter belonged to Vertikal-T (Russia).
- (Afghanistan) July 27, 2006: A Mi-8 helicopter operated by "Tryco" logistics company, and rented by "Fluor", crashed en route from Khost to Kabul, killing all sixteen passengers and crewmembers on board (including 2 American civilians and 2 Dutch ISAF soldiers).
- (Ukraine) April 24, 2006: An An-26 leased by the US State Department and carrying US DEA agents crashed on landing at Bost airport in Lashkar Gah, killing two young girls on the ground. The plane attempted to avoid a truck during landing. Two Ukrainian pilots died and two Ukrainians (flight engineer and other crew member) were wounded.
- (Georgia (country)) November 11, 2005: A Georgian registered IL-76 operated by Pakistan's Royal Airlines, on charter to carry food for coalition troops, crashed near Khak-e-Shahidan village, about 30 kilometres (19 mi) northwest of Kabul, killing all eight crew members (five Russians, two Ukrainians and one Pakistani).
- April 25, 2005: A Kazakhstan registered (UN-11003) Antonov An-12 cargo plane swerved off the runway at Kabul Airport. Five of the six crew members were slightly injured.
- (Moldova) December 30, 2004: A Moldovan registered (ER-IBM) IL-76 operated by Airline Transport crashed in Kabul Airport at 03:48.
- (United States) November 27, 2004: A US Registered CASA 212 contracted by the US Department of Defense to supply American forces deployed in remote areas of Afghanistan entered a box canyon and struck the 14,650-foot level of Baba Mountain, which has a peak elevation of 16,739 feet. The flight was about 25 nm north of the typical route between Bagram and Farah. All six occupants (three American crew members who were worked for "Presidential Airways" (Blackwater sister company) and three passengers) were killed.
- February 22, 2004: An AB-212 helicopter crashed after coming under fire 65 kilometres south-west of the southern city of Kandahar. Pilot Mark Burdorf, 45 years old, was killed. The helicopter belonged to Pacific Helicopters (Australia).

== Drone and unmanned aircraft ==
- 5 March 2021: A German IAI Heron drone is lost in Afghanistan.
- 16 November 2020: A German IAI Heron drone is lost in Mazar-i-Sharif, Afghanistan, with the cause of the loss likely a hacking by the Taliban.
- 2 September 2019: A US General Atomics MQ-9 Reaper is lost in Afghanistan.
- 10 April 2019: A US General Atomics MQ-9 Reaper is lost in Afghanistan.
- 17 March 2018: A US General Atomics MQ-9 Reaper is lost in Afghanistan.
- 28 October 2018: A US General Atomics MQ-9 Reaper is lost in Paktika, Afghanistan.
- 3 March 2017: A US undisclosed drone is lost in Afghanistan.
- 21 February 2016: A US General Atomics MQ-9 Reaper is lost while on landing in Afghanistan.
- 24 November 2015: A US General Atomics MQ-9 Reaper is lost while on landing by an operator error in Afghanistan.
- 18 November 2015: A US General Atomics MQ-9 Reaper is lost by an engine error in Afghanistan.
- 4 November 2015: A US MQ-1C Gray Eagle is lost in Kabul in Afghanistan.
- 31 August 2015: A US MQ-1C Gray Eagle is lost while on landing in Afghanistan.
- 31 August 2015: A US General Atomics MQ-9 Reaper is lost in Afghanistan.
- 28 June 2015: A US General Atomics MQ-9 Reaper is lost in Kandahar, Afghanistan.
- 7 June 2015: A US MQ-1C Gray Eagle is lost while on landing in Afghanistan.
- 18 May 2015: A US General Atomics MQ-9 Reaper is lost in Kandahar, Afghanistan.
- 1 March 2015: A US MQ-1B Predator is lost in Kandahar, Afghanistan.
- 17 September 2014: A US unknown drone is lost in, Afghanistan.
- 10 September 2014: A US MQ-1C Gray Eagle is lost by a mechanical failure in Afghanistan.
- 18 August 2014: A US MQ-1B Warrior is lost by an engine failure in, Afghanistan.
- 3 August 2014: A US MQ-1B Warrior is lost during midflight in Afghanistan.
- 14 July 2014: A US MQ-1B Predator is lost by an engine failure in Afghanistan.
- 25 June 2014: A US MQ-1B Predator is lost by an engine failure in Jalalabad, Afghanistan.
- 23 June 2014: A US MQ-1B Predator is lost by an engine failure in Jalalabad, Afghanistan.
- 16 June 2014: A US MQ-1C Gray Eagle is lost during landing in Afghanistan.
- 26 April 2014: A US MQ-1B Predator is lost during midflight in Afghanistan.
- 16 February 2014: A US MQ-1B Predator is lost during taxiing in Afghanistan.
- 13 November 2013: A US MQ-5B Hunter is lost during takeoff in Afghanistan.
- 16 October 2013: A US MQ-1C Gray Eagle is lost during landing in Afghanistan.
- 5 October 2013: A British Elbit Hermes 450 is lost in Afghanistan.
- 4 October 2013: A British Elbit Hermes 450 is lost in Afghanistan.
- 23 September 2013: A US MQ-1C Gray Eagle is lost during midflight by an engine failure in Afghanistan.
- 14 August 2013: A US MQ-1B Warrior lost link during midflight by in Afghanistan.
- 24 July 2013: A US MQ-1C Gray Eagle is lost during landing in Afghanistan.
- 27 June 2013: A US MQ-1B Predator is lost by a mechanical failure during landing in Afghanistan.
- 5 June 2013: A United States Marine Corps Kaman K-MAX helidrone is lost in Afghanistan.
- 11 May 2013: A US MQ-1B Predator is lost by a mechanical failure in Afghanistan.
- 29 March 2013: A US MQ-1B Predator is lost by a lightning strike while in flight in Afghanistan.
- 2 March 2013: A US MQ-1B Predator is lost by electronic failure in Afghanistan.
- 14 November 2012: A US MQ-1C Gray Eagle is lost during mid-flight by an engine failure in Afghanistan.
- 26 October 2012: A US MQ-1B Predator is lost by a mechanic failure in Afghanistan.
- 11 October 2012: A US MQ-1C Gray Eagle is lost during landing by an engine failure in Afghanistan.
- 25 September 2012: A US MQ-1C Gray Eagle is lost during landing by an engine failure in Afghanistan.
- 22 August 2012: A US MQ-1B Predator is lost during mid flight by an electronic failure in Afghanistan.
- 24 July 2012: A US MQ-1B Predator is lost during takeoff in Afghanistan.
- 22 July 2012: A British Elbit Hermes 450 is lost in Afghanistan.
- 20 July 2012: A US MQ-1C Gray Eagle is lost during landing in Afghanistan.
- 11 July 2012: A US MQ-1C Gray Eagle is lost during takeoff in Afghanistan.
- 7 July 2012: A US MQ-1C Gray Eagle is lost during landing in Afghanistan.
- 14 April 2012: A US MQ-1B Predator is lost during mid-flight by an engine failure in Afghanistan.
- 6 April 2012: A United States Navy MQ-8B Fire Scout is lost by an electronic failure in Afghanistan.
- 21 March 2012: A US MQ-1B Warrior lost link during midflight by in Afghanistan.
- 14 February 2012: A US MQ-1B Predator is lost during landing by an electrical failure in Afghanistan.
- 30 January 2012: A US MQ-1B Predator is lost during landing by a mechanical failure in Afghanistan.
- 27 December 2011: A US MQ-1B Predator is lost during mid flight by an engine failure in Afghanistan.
- December 2011: A German IAI Heron drone is lost in Afghanistan.
- 11 November 2011: A German IAI Heron drone is lost in Afghanistan.
- 2 October 2011: A British Elbit Hermes 450 drone is lost in Camp Bastion.
- 22 September 2011: A US MQ-1B Predator is lost during mid flight by an engine failure in Afghanistan.
- 21 August 2011: A US RQ-4 Global Hawk is lost during mid flight by an electrical failure in Afghanistan.
- 20 August 2011: A US MQ-1B Predator is lost during mid flight by a mechanical failure in Afghanistan.
- 10 July 2011: A US MQ-1B Predator lost link during flight in Afghanistan.
- 28 June 2011: A US MQ-1B Predator was lost during flight by bad weather in Afghanistan.
- 5 June 2011: A US MQ-1B Predator was lost during flight by a lightning strike in Afghanistan.
- 5 May 2011: A US MQ-1B Predator was lost during landing by an engine failure in Afghanistan.
- 1 May 2011: A US MQ-1B Predator was lost during flight by an engine failure in Afghanistan.
- 2 November 2010: A US MQ-5B Hunter was lost during takeoff in Afghanistan.
- 17 October 2010: A US MQ-5B Hunter was lost during landing in Afghanistan.
- 4 June 2010: An Australian IAI Heron crash landed in Afghanistan.
- 3 June 2010: A British Elbit Hermes 450 is lost in Afghanistan.
- 21 May 2010: A British Elbit Hermes 450 is lost in Afghanistan.
- 17 May 2010: A German IAI Heron drone is lost in Mazar-i-Sharif, Afghanistan.
- 17 March 2010: A German IAI Heron drone crashed into a C-160 cargo plane.
- 14 March 2010: A US MQ-1B Predator was lost during flight in Afghanistan.
- 13 February 2010: A US MQ-5B Hunter was lost during takeoff in Afghanistan.
- 9 February 2010: A US MQ-1B Predator was lost by unknown reasons in Afghanistan.
- 15 January 2010: A US MQ-1B Predator was lost by an operator error in Afghanistan.
- 13 December 2010: A US MQ-5B Hunter was lost during takeoff by an engine failure in Afghanistan.
- 20 November 2009: A US MQ-1B Predator is lost during mid flight in Afghanistan.
- 14 November 2009: A US MQ-1B Predator is lost during mid flight by a mechanical failure in Afghanistan.
- 3 October 2009: A US MQ-1B Predator is lost during mid flight by a pilot error in Afghanistan.
- 13 September 2009: A US MQ-9 Reaper lost link during mid flight in Afghanistan.
- 4 September 2009: A US MQ-1B Predator is lost during mid flight by a mechanical failure in Afghanistan.
- 4 June 2009: A US MQ-9 Reaper crashed during landing in Afghanistan.
- 2 June 2009: A British Elbit Hermes 450 is lost in Afghanistan.
- 13 May 2009: A US MQ-1B Predator lost link during mid flight by a mechanical failure in Afghanistan.
- 8 May 2009: A US MQ-1B Predator is lost during mid flight by a mechanical failure in Afghanistan.
- 20 April 2009: A US MQ-1B Predator is lost during mid flight by an electrical failure in Afghanistan.
- 14 March 2009: A Canadian SAGEM Sperwer drone crashed in Afghanistan.
- 8 February 2009: A US MQ-1B Predator is lost during mid flight by an engine failure in Afghanistan.
- 20 November 2008: A US MQ-1B Predator is lost in Afghanistan.
- 2 November 2008: A US MQ-1B Predator is lost by a drone operator error in Afghanistan.
- 25 October 2008: A Canadian SAGEM Sperwer drone crashed in Afghanistan.
- 21 October 2008: A Canadian SAGEM Sperwer drone crashed in Afghanistan.
- 21 June 2008: A US MQ-1B Predator is lost in Afghanistan.
- 13 June 2008: A US MQ-1B Predator is lost in Afghanistan.
- 9 April 2008: A British MQ-9 Reaper drone crashed in Afghanistan after a mechanical issue.
- 22 March 2008: A US Army General Atomics MQ-1 Predator is lost in Afghanistan.
- 28 January 2008: A US Army General Atomics MQ-1 Predator is lost in Afghanistan.
- 23 February 2007: A US MQ-1B Predator is lost by an engine failure during flight in Afghanistan.
- 2002: A German EMT Luna X-2000 drone crashed in Kabul after nearly colliding with a commercial flight.

== Summary per type ==
Rotary-wing losses

134 (38 to hostile fire)

Type	Destroyed	Hostile fire
AB-212	1	
AH-1W Supercobra	3	1
AH-64 Apache/AH Mk 1	15 (13 ,1, 1)	
UH-60 Black Hawk	21 (15, 2, 4)	7 (5, 2)
CH-47 Chinook/CH-46	37 (29, 2, 2, 2, 2)	15
CH-53E Super Stallion/CH-53 Sea Stallion	4 (3,1)	
CH-146 Griffon	1	
AS532 Cougar	2	1
AS332 Super Puma	1	
Westland Puma HC Mk 2	1	
Eurocopter Tiger	1	
HH-60 Pave Hawk	5	2
MD-530F	2	1
MH-53 Pave Low	3	
Mil Mi-17	15	2
Mil Mi-24	4	1
Merlin Mk3	1	
OH-58 Kiowa	9	4
Aerospatiale Gazelle	2	
Westland Lynx	1	
Westland Sea King	1	1
CV-22 Osprey	1	
UH-1N Huey family	3	
Unknown NATO helicopter	4	2

Fixed-wing losses

33 (*9 to hostile fire while on the ground)

Type	Destroyed	Hostile fire
F-15E Strike Eagle	1	
F-16 Falcon	3 (2, 1)	
MC-12 Liberty/C-12 Huron	2	
Dassault Rafale	1	
Mirage 2000	1	
C-130 Hercules	4	1*
Antonov An-32	1	
Beechcraft RC-12 Guardrail	1	
GR-4 Tornado	1	
Boeing KC-135 Stratotanker	1	
MC-130 Combat Talon	2	
Nimrod MR.2	1	
P-3 Orion	1	
U-2	1	
A-29 Super Tucano	1	
E-2 Hawkeye	1	
E-11	1	
B-1 Lancer	1	
AV-8B Harrier/Harrier II	8 (7, 1)	7*

Contract aircraft losses

27

Type	Destroyed	Hostile fire
IL-76	4	
Airbus A300	1	
Antonov An-12	4	
Antonov An-26	1	
Lockheed L-100 Hercules	2	
CASA 212	1	
Mi-26	2	1
Mi-8/ Mi-17	13	4
AB 212	1	1
Bell 214	2	
Boeing 747-400BCF	1	

UAVs or drones

96

Type	Destroyed	Hostile fire
EMT Luna X-2000	1	
SAGEM Sperwer	3	
MQ-1C Gray Eagle/	15	
MQ-1B/MQ-1L	46	
MQ-8B Fire Scout	1	
MQ-9 Reaper	13 (12, 1)	
Hermes 450	7	
MQ-5B Hunter	5	
Kaman K-MAX	1	
Heron	7	
RQ-4 Global Hawk	1	

Notes:

- Summaries are calculated based on the incidents included in this article.

== See also ==
- List of combat losses of United States military aircraft since the Vietnam War
- List of aviation shootdowns and accidents during the Iraq War
- List of Soviet aircraft losses during the Soviet–Afghan War
