= List of Soviet aircraft losses during the Soviet–Afghan War =

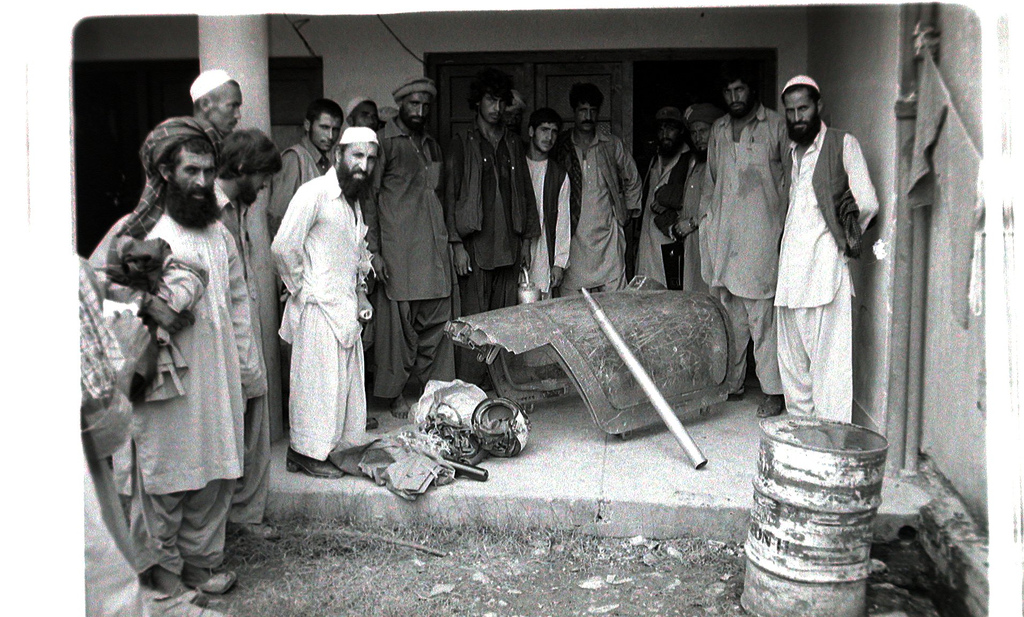
Afghans stand around the canopy of a downed Soviet jet in 1984.

The following is a partial and unofficial list of helicopter and airplane crashes, accidents and shootdowns that occurred during the Soviet–Afghan War of 1979–1989. In total, at least 333 helicopters and 118 Soviet jets were reported lost during the war.

== 1979 ==
- 25 December 1979 – An Il-76 heavy transport plane crashed into a mountain near the village of Kanzak (Northeast of Kabul) after being damaged by anti-aircraft artillery fire. Its pilot, 37 paratroopers and nine troops from unknown units were killed upon impact, leaving no survivors. Two vehicles in cargo, including a fuel truck, were also destroyed.

== 1980 ==
- 9 January 1980 – Mi-8 was shot down using DShK; all crew members survived.
- 7 February 1980 – An-12 transport aircraft crashed on the outskirts of Kabul, killing its pilot.
- 13 February 1980 – An Mi-24 attack helicopter was badly damaged by ground fire, and crashed in a botched emergency landing.
- 23 February 1980 – An Mi-8TV Border guard helicopter was shot down, killing one passenger.
- 7 March 1980 – An Mi-8 crashed due to a technical malfunction, killing all crew members.
- 7 March 1980 – An Mi-6 was shot down in Kush mountains.
- 10 March 1980 – An Mi-8 transport helicopter crashed due to technical difficulties near the village of Kochek Qizil (Southwest of Mazari Sharif), killing two crew members.
- 23 March 1980 – Su-17 fighter-bomber crashed due to either technical problems or poor weather conditions, killing its pilot.
- 24 March 1980 – An Mi-8 crashed due to pilots error, killing three people.
- 30 March 1980 – An Mi-8 was shot down with DShK; all on board survived.
- 30 March 1980 – An Mi-24D crashed due to technical failure, crew survived.
- 9 April 1980 – An Mi-8T transport helicopter, crashed due to either technical problems or poor weather conditions, killing two crew members.
- 11 April 1980 – An Mi-8 transport helicopter was shot down near the remote village of Shindand, killing two crew members.
- 24 April 1980 – An Mi-24 assault helicopter was shot down.
- 12 June 1980 – An Mi-8 transport helicopter was shot down, killing one crew member.
- 1 July 1980 – An Mi-24 assault helicopter was shot down.
- 5 July 1980 – An Mi-24 assault helicopter was shot down.
- 20 July 1980 – An Mi-10 heavy transport helicopter was shot down, killing three crew members.
- 23 July 1980 – An Mi-24 assault helicopter was shot down, killing two crew members.
- 23 July 1980 – An Mi-8 transport helicopter was shot down, killing one crew member.
- 1 August 1980 – A MiG-21 aircraft was shot down. Pilot was killed.
- 25 August 1980 – An Mi-24 assault helicopter was shot down.
- 6 September 1980 – An unidentified aircraft crashed due to either technical problems or bad weather, killing one crew member.
- 18 October 1980 – An Mi-24 assault helicopter was shot down.
- 12 December 1980 – An Mi-24 assault helicopter was shot down.

== 1981 ==
- 17 April 1981 – An Mi-24 assault helicopter was shot down, killing one crew member.
- 15 June 1981 – A MiG-21 aircraft was shot down. One crewman, Mikhail Korchinsky, was killed. The other crewman, Yuri Moscowchuk, was captured, becoming the first Soviet air force pilot to be a prisoner of war.
- 24 July 1981 – An Mi-8 transport helicopter was shot down, killing four crew members.
- 5 September 1981 – An Mi-8T transport helicopter was shot down, killing four crew members.
- 10 October 1981 – An Mi-8MT transport helicopter was shot down, killing one crew member.
- 17 October 1981 – An Mi-8T Border Guard helicopter was shot down, killing one crew member.
- 28 October 1981 – An Mi-24 assault helicopter was shot down, killing three crew members.
- 13 November 1981 – An Mi-8 transport helicopter was shot down, killing one crew member.
- 18 November 1981 – An Mi-8MT transport helicopter was shot down, killing two crew members.

== 1982 ==
- 10 March 1982 – An unidentified aircraft crashed, killing one crew member.
- 15 April 1982 – An unidentified aircraft was shot down, killing one crew member.
- 17 May 1982 – An unidentified aircraft crashed, killing one crew member.
- 27 May 1982 – An Mi-24 attack helicopter was shot down, killing one crew member.
- 27 May 1982 – A MiG-21 aircraft was shot down.
- ? June 1982 – A MiG-21 aircraft was shot down.
- 13 June 1982 – An Mi-8 transport helicopter was shot down near the village of Taghaz (245 km to the Southwest of Kandahar), killing two crew members.
- 10 July 1982 – An unidentified aircraft was shot down, killing one crew member.
- 6 August 1982 – An Mi-24 assault helicopter was shot down.
- 13 August 1982 – A MiG-21 aircraft was shot down. Pilot was killed
- 18 August 1982 – A MiG-21 aircraft was shot down.
- 23 August 1982 – An Mi-6 heavy transport helicopter was shot down, killing one crew member.
- 11 September 1982 – An Mi-24 assault helicopter was shot down.
- 7 October 1982 – An Mi-24 assault helicopter was shot down.
- 11 October 1982 – An Mi-24 assault helicopter was shot down.
- 12 October 1982 – An unidentified helicopter was shot down, killing one crew member.
- 24 October 1982 – A MiG-21 aircraft was shot down.
- 30 October 1982 – An unidentified helicopter was shot down, killing three crew members.
- 4 December 1982 – A Su-17 aircraft was shot down. Both crewmen were killed

== 1983 ==
- 4 January 1983 – An unidentified helicopter was shot down near the village of Kholm (East of Mazari Sharif), killing one crew member.
- 15 February 1983 – An An-12 was shot down while on approach to Jalalabad. The five crew members were killed.
- 22 February 1983 – An Mi-6 heavy transport helicopter was shot down, killing one crew member.
- 5 June 1983 – An Mi-24 attack helicopter was shot down, killing two crew members.
- 19 July 1983 – An Mi-8 transport helicopter was shot down, killing one crew member.
- 24 July 1983 – An Mi-8 transport helicopter was shot down near Jalalabad, killing two crew members.
- 7 August 1983 – An unidentified helicopter was shot down, killing one crew member.
- 9 September 1983 – An Mi-8 transport helicopter was shot down 120 km South of Faizabad, killing one crew member.
- 16 September 1983 – An Antonov An-12 transport plane was shot down, killing four crew members.
- 3 October 1983 – An Mi-24 assault helicopter was shot down.
- 18 October 1983 – An Mi-8 transport helicopter was shot down near the Kajaki reservoir (Helmand province), killing two crew members.
- 21 October 1983 – An Mi-24 assault helicopter was shot down.
- 25 October 1983 – An unidentified aircraft crashed, killing one crew member.
- 29 October 1983 – A MiG-21 aircraft was shot down.
- 15 November 1983 – An Mi-6 heavy transport missed the Soviet landing strip near the town of Kunduz and crashed due to a faulty tail rotor. Two crew members were killed.

== 1984 ==
- 16 January 1984 – A Su-25 strike jet was shot down, killing its pilot.
- 6 March 1984 – An Mi-24 assault helicopter was shot down.
- 2 April 1984 – An unidentified helicopter crashed either due to bad weather or a technical failure. One crew member was killed.
- ? May 1984 – 4 MiG-21 Aircraft were destroyed on the ground.
- 9 May 1984 – An Mi-24 assault helicopter was shot down.
- 5 June 1984 – An Mi-24 assault helicopter was shot down.
- 6 June 1984 – An Mi-24 assault helicopter was shot down.
- 2 July 1984 – An Mi-8 transport helicopter was shot down, killing one crew member.
- 3 July 1984 – An Mi-24 assault helicopter was shot down.
- 5 July 1984 – An Mi-8 transport helicopter was shot down, killing one crew member.
- 6 July 1984 – An Mi-6 heavy transport helicopter was shot down on approach to its base (while returning from a mission). All three crew members were killed. It is possible that this helicopter was captured by Afghan guerrillas.
- 14 July 1984 – An unidentified helicopter crashed. One crew member was killed.
- ? August 1984 – An Mi-24 assault helicopter was shot down.
- 6 August 1984 – An unidentified helicopter was shot down. One crew member was killed.
- 23 August 1984 – An Mi-24 assault helicopter was shot down.
- 27 August 1984 – An unidentified helicopter was shot down. One crew member was killed.
- 19 September 1984 – An Mi-8 transport helicopter was shot down, killing all three crew members in addition to a unit of paratroopers.
- 23 September 1984 – An unidentified helicopter crashed. One crew member was killed.
- 16 October 1984 – An Mi-8 transport helicopter was shot down while landing a group of soldiers near the town of Baghlan. All three crew members and four disembarking troops were killed.
- 18 October 1984 – A Su-25 strike jet was shot down, killing its pilot.
- 18 October 1984 – An unidentified helicopter (probably a Mi-24) was shot down, killing two crew members.
- 27 October 1984 – An Il-76 heavy transport plane was shot down during landing, 20 km to the South East of Kabul. Five were killed.
- 28 October 1984 – An Mi-24 assault helicopter was shot down in the Panshir Valley, killing two crew members.
- 8 November 1984 – An Mi-24 assault helicopter was shot down.
- 27 November 1984 – An Mi-24 assault helicopter was shot down.
- 1 December 1984 – An Mi-24 assault helicopter was shot down.
- 10 December 1984 – An Su-25 strike jet was shot down.

== 1985 ==
- 22 January 1985 – An An-26 transport plane was shot down, killing one.
- 29 January 1985 – An Mi-8 transport helicopter was shot down shortly after taking off from Kandahar, en route to Kabul, killing one crew member.
- 13 February 1985 – An Su-25 strike jet was shot down, killing its pilot.
- 11 March 1985 – An An-30 transport plane was struck in the left engine by ground fire, causing a fire that began to spread. All non-essential crew members bailed out, while the pilot and co-pilot remained, hoping to land the aircraft at Bagram Airport (near Kabul). The aircraft crashed 25 km from Kabul after the fire destroyed the aileron controls, and both were killed.
- 14 March 1985 – An Mi-6 heavy transport helicopter collided with a Soviet Air Force reconnaissance plane, killing three.
- 20 March 1985 – An Mi-8 transport helicopter was shot down while transporting troops from Ghazni to Baraki(?). All five aboard were killed.
- 24 March 1985 – An Mi-24 assault helicopter was shot down.
- 27 April 1985 – An Mi-8 transport helicopter was shot down 7 km away from its destination of Lashkargah while transporting troops. Three were killed.
- 11 May 1985 – An Mi-24 assault helicopter was shot down.
- 18 May 1985 – An Mi-6 heavy transport helicopter was shot down near the remote village of Bakarak, killing one.
- 1 June 1985 – An Mi-24 assault helicopter was shot down.
- 18 June 1985 – An Mi-24 assault helicopter was shot down.
- 21 June 1985 – A MiG-23 fighter jet was shot down, killing its pilot.
- 21 June 1985 – An Mi-8 transport helicopter was shot down, killing one.
- 27 June 1985 – An Mi-8 transport helicopter shot down, possibly with several troops on board. All those aboard were killed.
- 10 July 1985 – An Mi-24 attack helicopter was shot down, killing one.
- 16 July 1985 – An Mi-24 assault helicopter was shot down.
- 11 July 1985 – An unidentified ‘special missions’ aircraft was shot down, killing five.
- 22 July 1985 – A Su-25 strike jet was shot down.
- 23 July 1985 – A MiG-23 fighter jet was shot down.
- 25 July 1985 – An unidentified aircraft crashed, killing one.
- 16 August 1985 – An Mi-24 assault helicopter was shot down.
- 19 August 1985 – An Mi-24 assault helicopter was shot down.
- 17 September 1985 – An Mi-6 heavy transport helicopter was attacked on the ground, killing one.
- 21 September 1985 – An Mi-24 assault helicopter was shot down.
- 24 September 1985 – An Mi-24 assault helicopter was shot down.
- 3 October 1985 – An Mi-6 heavy transport helicopter was shot down.
- 12 October 1985 – An Mi-6 heavy transport helicopter was shot down 23 km South of Kabul, killing two.
- 13 October 1985 – An unidentified aircraft crashed, killing one.
- 18 October 1985 – An unidentified aircraft was shot down, killing one.
- 25 October 1985 – An Mi-8 transport helicopter was shot down 20 km to the Northwest of Kunduz, killing nine crew members and paratroopers.
- 1 November 1985 – An Mi-8 transport helicopter was shot down, killing one.
- 7 November 1985 – An Mi-24 assault helicopter was shot down.
- 15 November 1985 – An Mi-24 assault helicopter was shot down.
- 24 November 1985 – An unidentified aircraft crashed, killing one.
- 6 December 1985 – An Mi-8 transport helicopter shot down while transporting troops, killing seven.
- 16 December 1985 – A Su-17 aircraft was shot down.
- 27 December 1985 – A MiG-23 fighter jet was shot down.

== 1986 ==
- 13 January 1986 – An Mi-24 assault helicopter was shot down.
- 18 January 1986 – An unidentified aircraft crashed, killing one.
- 19 January 1986 – An Mi-8 transport helicopter was shot down, killing all crew members and paratroopers aboard.
- 1 February 1986 – An Mi-24 attack helicopter was shot down West of Maymaneh, killing one.
- 21 February 1986 – An Mi-24 assault helicopter was shot down.
- 5 March 1986 – An Mi-24 assault helicopter was shot down.
- 3 April 1986 – An Su-17 aircraft was shot down.
- 6 April 1986 – An Su-25 strike jet was shot down by MANPADS; pilot Alexander Rutskoy safely ejects.
- 18 April 1986 – An Su-25 strike jet was shot down.
- 21 April 1986 – An Mi-8 transport helicopter was shot down, killing two.
- 2 May 1986 – An Mi-24 assault helicopter was shot down.
- 17 May 1986 – Either one or two Su-22s were shot down by an F-16 flown by Hameed Qadri of the 9 Squadron of the Pakistan Air Force. Some accounts state that both were shot down, others say that one was only damaged.
- 24 May 1986 – An Mi-24 assault helicopter was shot down.
- 26 May 1986 – An Mi-24 assault helicopter was shot down.
- 31 May 1986 – An Mi-24 attack helicopter was shot down over Kabul airbase, killing two instantly while another died of his wounds six days later.
- 3 June 1986 – An Mi-24 assault helicopter was shot down.
- 15 July 1986 – An Mi-24 assault helicopter was shot down.
- 31 July 1986 – Two Mi-8 medevac helicopters collided near Pagman, killing some of the injured passengers.
- 22 September 1986 – An Su-17 aircraft was shot down.
- 25 September 1986 – An Mi-24 assault helicopter was shot down.
- September 1986 was the month that the FIM-92 Stinger missile was introduced by the CIA and Zia ul-Haq of Pakistan into the war.
- 16 October 1986 – An Mi-8 transport helicopter was shot down, killing two.
- 19 October 1986 – An Mi-24 attack helicopter was shot down, killing one.
- 22 October 1986 – An Su-17 aircraft was shot down.
- 20 November 1986 – An Su-25 strike jet was shot down.
- 29 November 1986 – An An-12 transport plane was shot down while leaving Kabul Airbase en route to Jalalabad, transporting a contingent of newly arrived Russian troops. All crew members (4–5) and all 27 passengers were killed.
- 29 November 1986 – An Mi-24 assault helicopter was shot down.
- 29 November 1986 – An Mi-24 assault helicopter was shot down.
- 3 December 1986 – An Su-25 strike jet was shot down.
- 3 December 1986 – An Su-25 strike jet was shot down.
- 26 December 1986 – An An-26RT transport plane was shot down. All crew members bailed out, except the mechanic, who was killed either by the missile or in the crash.

== 1987 ==
- 12 January 1987 – An Mi-24 assault helicopter was shot down by MANPADS.
- 14 January 1987 – An Mi-8 transport helicopter was shot down by MANPADS.
- 21 January 1987 – An Su-25 strike jet was shot down by MANPADS.
- 28 January 1987 – An Su-25 strike jet was shot down by MANPADS.
- 2 February 1987 – An Su-17M3 suffered combat damage.
- 27 February 1987 – An Mi-24 assault helicopter was shot down at night by MANPADS.
- 2 April 1987 – An Su-25 aircraft was shot down by MANPADS.
- 4 April 1987 – An Mi-24 assault helicopter suffered combat damage by MANPADS.
- 12 April 1987 – An Mi-8 suffered combat damage by MANPADS.
- 12 April 1987 – An Su-17 aircraft was shot down.
- 15 April 1987 – An Mi-8 was shot down by MANPADs attempting to land.
- 15 April 1987 – A Yak-28R aircraft crashed, killing one.
- 16 April 1987 – A MiG-23 fighter jet was shot down by a Pakistani F-16 Sidewinder.
- 18 April 1987 - An Mi-24 assault helicopter is shot down by MANPADS.
- 22 April 1987 – An Mi-24 assault helicopter was shot down.
- 18 May 1987 – An Mi-24 attack helicopter was shot down by MANPADS.
- 28 May 1987 – An Su-25 aircraft was shot down, killing two.
- 31 May 1987 – An Mi-24 assault helicopter was shot down.
- 1 June 1987 – An Su-25 strike jet was shot down.
- 4 June 1987 – An Mi-24 assault helicopter was shot down.
- 5 June 1987 – An Mi-8 Medevac helicopter carrying one wounded individual was shot down North of Kandahar, killing one.
- 1 June 1987 – An Su-25 aircraft is shot down by MANPADS.
- 3 June 1987 – An Mi-24 aircraft was shot down.
- 20 June 1987 – An Mi-24 assault helicopter is shot down by MANPADS.
- 9 July 1987 – An Mi-24 assault helicopter was destroyed by artillery fire.
- 21 July 1987 - A pair of Mi-8 helicopters are lost by MANPADS.
- 15 July 1987 – An Mi-24 assault helicopter was shot down.
- 28 July 1987 – An Su-22 suffered combat damage and was destroyed.
- 1 August 1987 – An Mi-6 aircraft crashed, killing one.
- 13 August 1987 –An An-12 aircraft suffered combat damage.
- 30 August 1987 – An Mi-8Mt operating at night shot down by MANPADS.
- 29 September 1987 – An Mi-24 assault helicopter was shot down, killing two.
- 8 October 1987 – An Su-17MZR suffered combat damage.
- 24 October 1987 – An Su-25 suffered combat damage from MANPADS.
- 30 October 1987 – An MI-24 was shot down by MANPADS.
- 27 November 1987 – An Mi-8 helicopter was shot down.
- 21 December 1987 – An An-26 was shot down by MANPADS.
- 23 December 1987 – An Mi-8Mt transport helicopter was shot down by MANPADS.

== 1988 ==
- 17 January 1988 – An Mi-8 transport helicopter was shot down, killing four.
- 6 February 1988 – An Mi-8 transport helicopter on a search and rescue mission was shot down with several rescued personnel aboard, killing two and wounding 6.
- 16 February 1988 – An Mi-24 attack helicopter was shot down, killing one.
- 26 February 1988 – An Mi-24 attack helicopter was shot down, killing one.
- 29 February 1988 – An Mi-24 attack helicopter shot down 10 km Southeast of Bagram, killing one.
- 18 April 1988 – An Mi-24 assault helicopter was shot down.
- 20 April 1988 – An Mi-24 assault helicopter was shot down.
- 25 May 1988 – An unidentified aircraft crashed, killing one.
- 23 June 1988 – 8 Su-25 strike jets were destroyed on the ground.
- ? June 1988 – 1 Su-25 strike jet was destroyed on the ground.
- 18 July 1988 – An unidentified helicopter (possibly a Mi-8) was shot down, killing one.
- 4 August 1988 – A Su-25 strike jet was shot down by a Pakistani F-16; pilot Alexander Rutskoy safely ejects.
- 21 August 1988 – An Mi-24 attack helicopter shot down, killing its two-member crew.
- 27 August 1988 – An Mi-24 assault helicopter was shot down.
- 4 September 1988 – An Mi-8 transport helicopter was shot down, killing one.
- 30 September 1988 – An Mi-24 attack helicopter was shot down, killing two.
- 1 October 1988 – An Mi-8 transport was helicopter shot down, killing one.

== 1989 ==
- 7 January 1989 – A Su-25 strike jet was shot down, killing its pilot.
- 19 January 1989 – An Mi-8 transport helicopter was shot down, killing five.
- 2 February 1989 – An Mi-24 assault helicopter was shot down, killing both crew members.
- 6 March 1989 – An Antonov was struck by a rocket killing two.

== Summary by aircraft type ==
- An-12 6
- An-26 4
- An-30 1
- Il-76 2
- Mi-6 10
- Mi-8 45
- Mi-10 1
- Mi-24 74
- MiG-21 12 (4 to hostile fire while on the ground)
- MiG-23 4
- Su-17 10
- Su-22 5
- Su-25 23 (9 to hostile fire while on the ground)
- Unidentified aircraft 24
- Unidentified helicopter 14

Total 235 (of all types)

== Non-Soviet losses ==
- (2) 26 September 1988 - Two Soviet MiG-23MLs intercepted and shot down two Iranian Air force Bell AH-1 SuperCobras flying southeast of Shindand, Herat Province.
- (4) October 1988 - Since October 1987 several rogue and defected Democratic Republic of Afghanistan Air Force Su-22s attempted to bomb the Kabul Presidencial Palace. At least four were intercepted and shot down by Soviet MiG-29s based on Termez Airbase.
- 29 April 1987 - One Pakistani F-16 was lost during an encounter between two F-16s and six Afghan aircraft; the pilot ejected safely. The downed F-16 was likely hit accidentally by a Sidewinder fired by the other F-16.

== See also ==
- List of aviation accidents and incidents in the war in Afghanistan
