= Bell 214ST =

Helicopter in the US

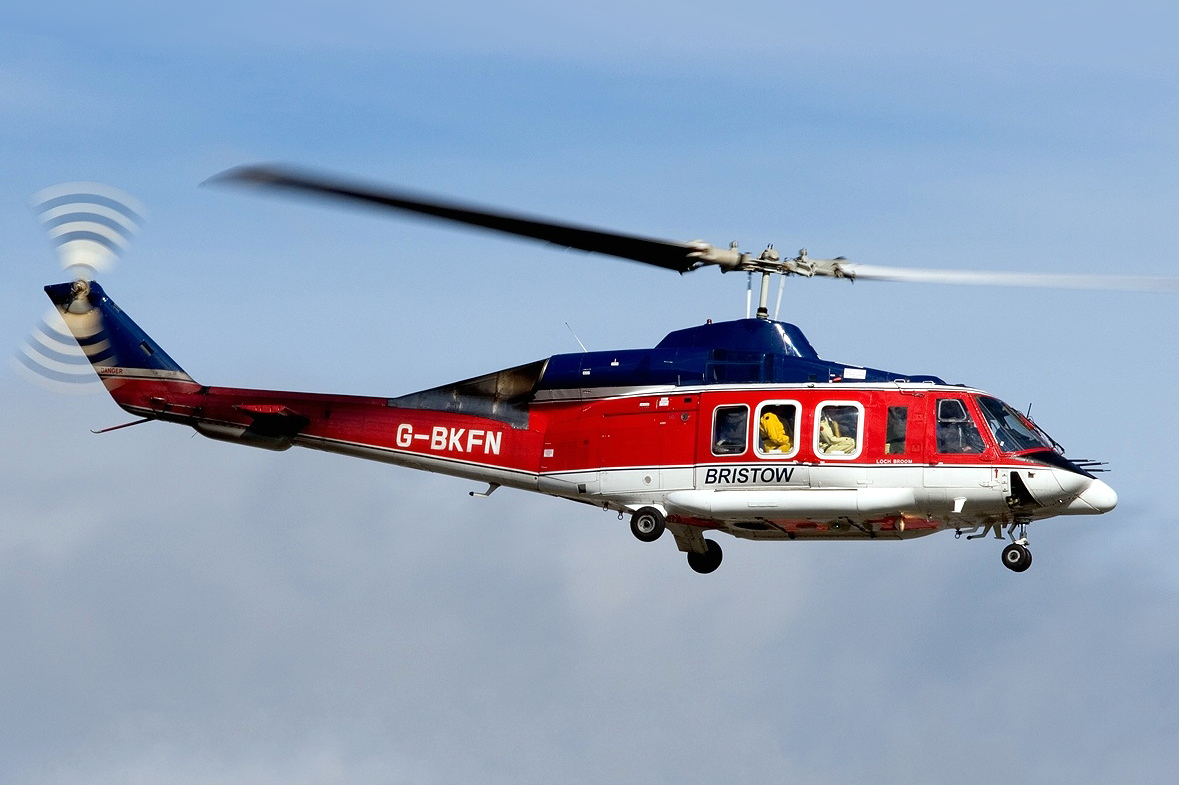
- A Bristow Bell 214ST over Aberdeen, Scotland

General information
- Type: Medium-lift helicopter
- National origin: United States
- Manufacturer: Bell Helicopter
- Status: Production completed
- Primary users: Peruvian Air Force Royal Brunei Air Force; Royal Thai Navy; Iraqi Air Force (historical)
- Number built: 96

History
- Manufactured: 1979–1993
- Introduction date: 1982
- First flight: 21 July 1979
- Developed from: Bell 214

The Bell 214ST is a medium-lift, twin-engine helicopter descended from Bell Helicopter's ubiquitous UH-1 Huey series. Though it shares a type number with the somewhat-related Bell 214, the Bell 214ST is larger and of quite different appearance. Prior to the Bell 525 Relentless, it was the company's largest helicopter.

The Bell 214ST emerged during the 1970s as an Iranian-financed development of the smaller and less powerful Bell 214. It was originally intended to be produced In Iran, however, following the Iranian Revolution of 1979, the sizable order that had been made by the country evaporated; nevertheless, Bell persisted with the programme, the maiden flight taking place on 21 July 1979 and type certification being secured in 1982. During the early 1980s, Bell reoriented the Bell 214ST towards civil sales. This civilian designation permitted the type's sale to Iraq in spite of an arms embargo. Bell did produce a militarised variant of the type, which was also procured by several other military operators as well.

The civilian operators used the Bell 214ST in several different roles, from supporting oil exploration activities in Europe to aerial firefighting in Australia. Furthermore, the United States Navy evaluated the use of civilian-operated Bell 214STs for vertical replenishment duties. By the 2020s, McDermott Aviation had emerged as the largest civil operator of the type; in March 2025, the company announced its intention to resume production of the Bell 214ST, which had been discontinued by Bell in 1993.

== Design and development ==
The Bell 214ST was originally developed during the 1970s and early 1980s as a military project from the Bell 214B BigLifter, specifically for production in Iran and the development by Bell was funded by the Iranian government. The fundamental difference was the replacement of the Model 214's single Lycoming LTC-4 turboshaft engine with two 1,625 shp (1,212 kW) General Electric T700 engines, to improve the helicopter's hot and high performance and improve safety. An interim twin-engine conversion of a Model 214 flew on 15 February 1977 in Texas, Testing was successful, and Bell decided to press forward with a definitive twin-engine Bell 214ST, with a fuselage stretched by 30 in (76 cm) and a revised main rotor of greater diameter. Iran changed its production plans, with 50 Bell 214A and 350 Bell 214STs to be built at the new production plant to be set up at Isfahan, Iran.

Comparison between a 214 and larger 214ST

Work started on three conforming prototypes in 1978. The overthrow of the Shah in 1979 resulted in the cancellation of Iran's orders. By this time the new helicopter had attracted sufficient interest from other potential customers for Bell to continue with the project and build the 214ST at their Dallas-Fort Worth facility instead. As a result, it was launched as a civil helicopter, rather than a military one. This re-designation as a civil aircraft was invoked by Ronald Reagan to give legitimacy to the U.S.'s sale of 45 helicopters to Iraq during the Iran–Iraq War starting in July 1985, which otherwise would've been in contradiction to the existing arms embargo that the U.S. had placed on both nations.

The first of the three full 214ST prototypes flew on 21 July 1979. Manufacturing of production 214STs began in 1981. Type certification from the Federal Aviation Administration (FAA) and Civil Aviation Authority (CAA) for visual and instrument flight rules was awarded in 1982. The military variant followed into production with helicopter deliveries commencing in 1982.

The Bell 214ST included major design changes from the Bell 214. The Bell 214ST has a larger, stretched fuselage with seating for 16-18 passengers, and two 1,625 shp (1,212 kW) GE CT7-2A engines. The helicopter introduced some ground-breaking innovations for Bell, including a one-hour run-dry transmission, fiberglass rotor blades, elastomeric rotorhead bearings, and the option of either skid or wheeled landing gear. The helicopter has a cockpit door and a large cabin door on each side. The 214ST has a fuel capacity of 435 US gallons (1,650 L). An auxiliary fuel system could be added.

The Model 214ST was the largest helicopter that had been built by Bell at that time (since surpassed by the Bell 525 Relentless) The ST was originally an acronym for "Stretched Twin", but was later changed to "Super Transporter". Bell built a total of 96 214STs with production ending in 1993. In 2015, Bell enacted a license agreement with the helicopter company Erickson Inc. to provide aftermarket support for the Bell 214 platform; six years later, the type certificate was sold to Erickson.

In 2023, Erickson sold the type certificates for the 214B, 214B-1 and 214ST to the Australian helicopter specialist McDermott Aviation.

In March 2025, McDermott announced its intention to relaunch production of a modified version of the Bell 214ST, referred to as the McDermott 214ST, in response to an alleged global shortage of rotary-wing firefighting platforms. The initial production batch of 40 new-build rotorcraft is to be produced on a final assembly line in San Bernardino, California. Major suppliers for the programme reportedly include Safran, Aerometals, Moog, Genesys Aerosystems, Kaman, Robinson Helicopter and Bell. The McDermott 214ST is to be powered by a pair of Safran Aneto turboshaft engines. Furthermore, the company plans to start delivery of refurbished Bell 214s during 2027. By March 2026, McDermott was the largest operator of the Bell 214.

== Operational history ==
Various military services have operated the Bell 214ST. One of the largest such customers was Iraq, which received 48 examples of the type indirectly from the United States during the 1980s. Specifically, the country had been actively engaged in the Iran-Iraq War at the time of the acquisition; it was alleged that the sale had been permitted after Iraqi officials had issued assurances that they were for civilian use only. However, by the First Gulf War, several Bell 214STs were observed in Iraqi military markings. Other military operators of the type include Brunei (1), Peru (11), Thailand (9) and Venezuela (4).

During the 1990s, the United States Navy evaluated the use of several civilian rotorcraft, including the Bell 214ST, for their potential use as commercially-operated vertical replenishment platforms in place of the aging Boeing Vertol CH-46 Sea Knight fleet. Also in the 1990s, the civil operator Bristow Helicopters used the type to fulfil its oil exploration support commitments, such as over the Black Sea; by 2007, Bristow had phased out all but one of its Bell 214STs in favour of other platforms.

By the 2020s, McDermott Aviation had emerged as the largest civil operator of the type. In addition to its domestic contracts, the company has often air-transported portions of its fleet to both North America and Europe using Boeing 747s for various purposes, including seasonal aerial firefighting contracts and refurbishment packages. Another company, Erickson Inc., also operated the Bell 214ST in a firefighting capacity.

== Operators ==
=== Military operators ===
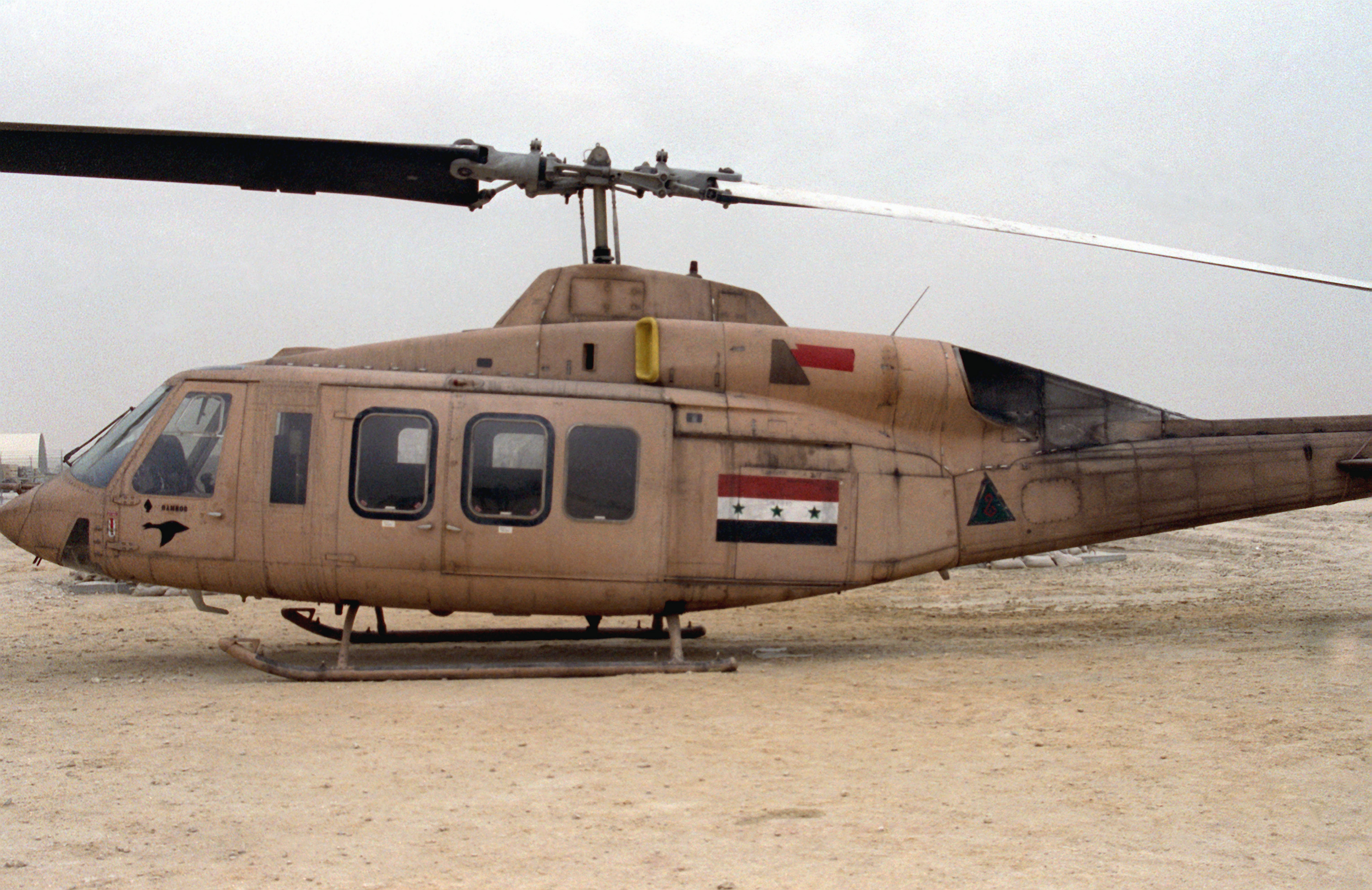
An Iraqi Air Force Bell 214ST

Brunei

- Royal Brunei Air Force

Peru

- Peruvian Air Force

=== Civil operators ===
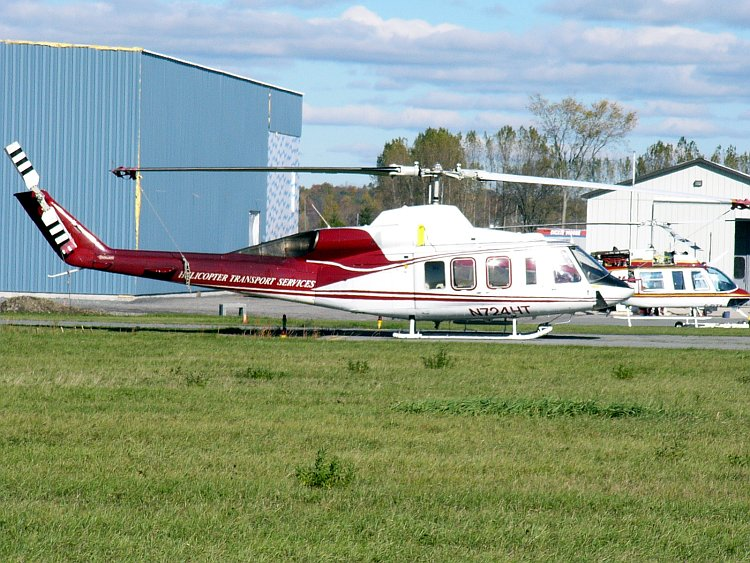
A Bell 214ST of Helicopter Transport Services

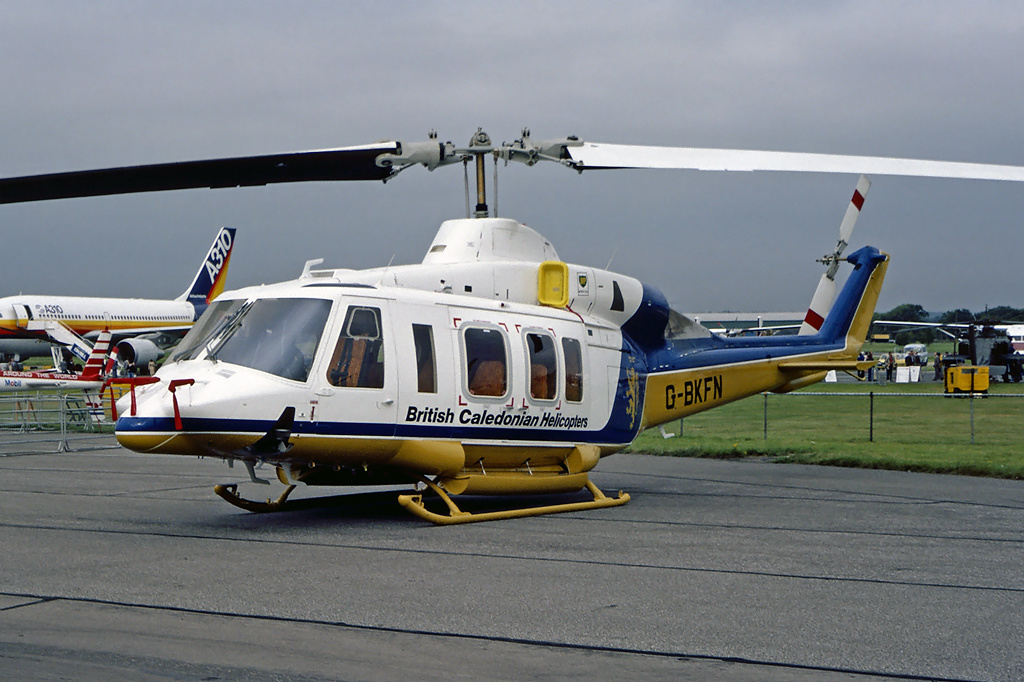
A British Caledonian Helicopters Bell 214ST

Australia

- McDermott Aviation

Canada

- Helicopter Transport Services

United States

- Presidential Airways
- Evergreen Helicopters

Japan

- Ministry of Land, Infrastructure, Transport and Tourism

=== Former operators ===
Norway

- CHC Helikopter Service

Ba'athist Iraq / Republic of Iraq

- Iraqi Air Force

Thailand

- Royal Thai Navy

United Kingdom

- British Caledonian Helicopters
- Bristow Helicopters

Uganda

- Ugandan Air Force

United States

- Air Logistics (now Bristow Helicopters)
- Petroleum Helicopters (PHI)

Venezuela

- Venezuelan Air Force

== Aircraft on display ==
United States

- Flying Leatherneck Aviation Museum located in Irvine, California

== Specifications (214ST) ==
Bell 214ST 3-view image

Data from International Directory of Civil Aircraft, Complete Encyclopedia of World Aircraft

General characteristics

- Crew: 1 or 2
- Capacity: Internal: 16 or 17 passengers or equivalent cargo; External: 8,000 lb (3,630 kg) sling load
- Length: 49 ft 4 in (15.03 m)
- Wingspan: 52 ft 0 in (15.85 m)
- Height: 15 ft 11 in (4.84 m)
- Wing area: 2,124 sq ft (107.3 m^{2})
- Empty weight: 9,481 lb (4,300 kg)
- Max takeoff weight: 17,500 lb (7,938 kg)
- Powerplant: 2 × General Electric CT7-2A turboshaft, 1,625 shp (1,215 kW) each

Performance

- Maximum speed: 143 kn (165 mph, 264 km/h)
- Cruise speed: 140 kn (161 mph, 259 km/h)
- Range: 435 nmi (500 mi, 858 km)
- Service ceiling: 10,400 ft (3,170 m) ; ceiling for hover in ground effect
- Rate of climb: 1,780 ft/min (9.04 m/s)

== See also ==
- Bell 525 Relentless

Related development

- Bell 214
- Bell 212

Aircraft of comparable role, configuration, and era

- Westland 30
