= Bell 214 =

American helicopter

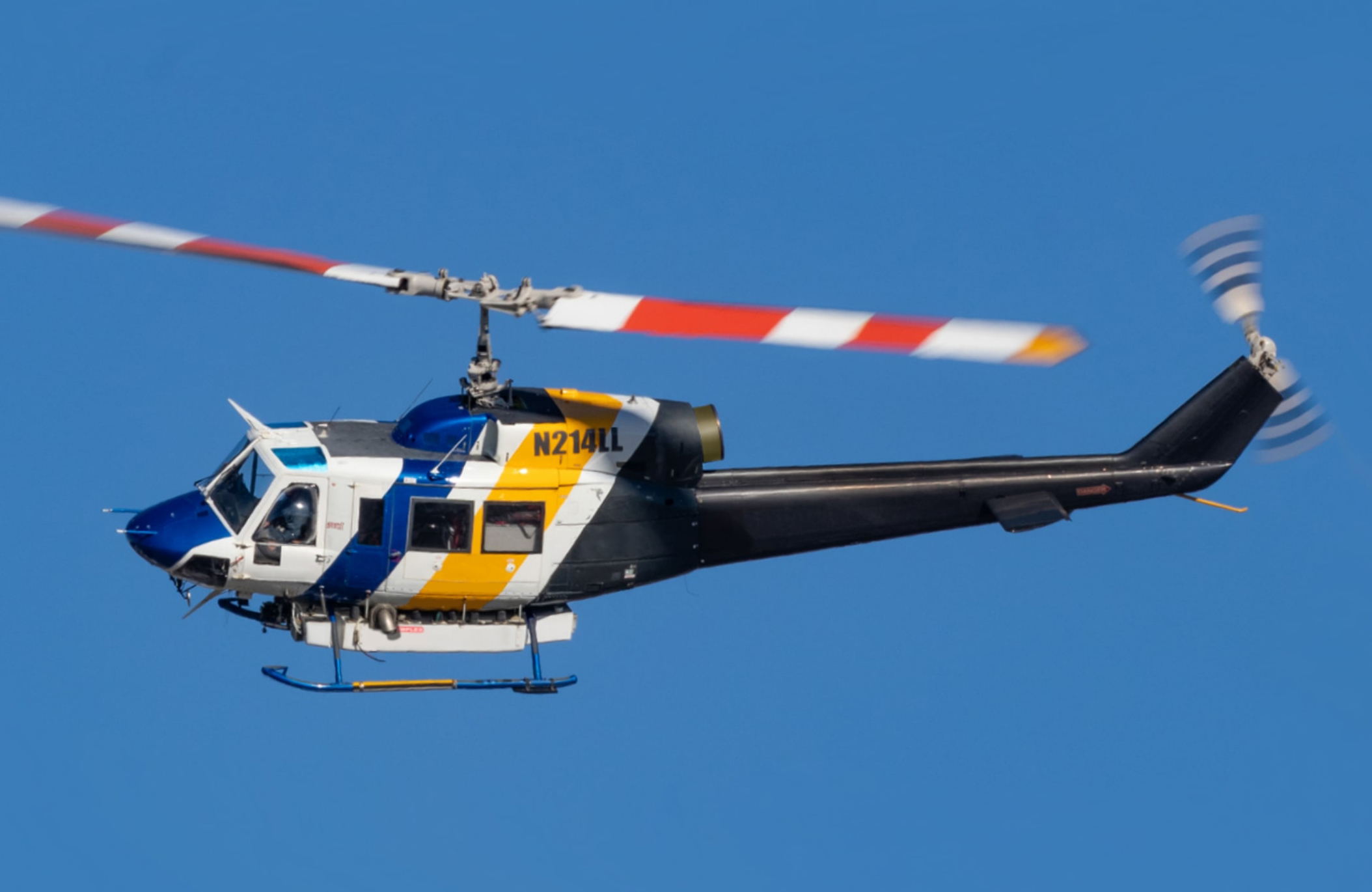
- A Bell 214B

General information
- Type: Medium-lift helicopter
- National origin: United States
- Manufacturer: Bell Helicopter
- Status: Production completed
- Primary user: Islamic Republic of Iran Army

History
- Manufactured: 1970–1981
- Introduction date: 1972
- First flight: 1970
- Developed from: Bell 204/205
- Developed into: Bell 214ST

The Bell 214 is a medium-lift helicopter derived from Bell Helicopter's prolific UH-1 Huey series. The Bell 214ST shares the same model number, but is a larger, much-modified, twin-engined aircraft.

== Design and development ==
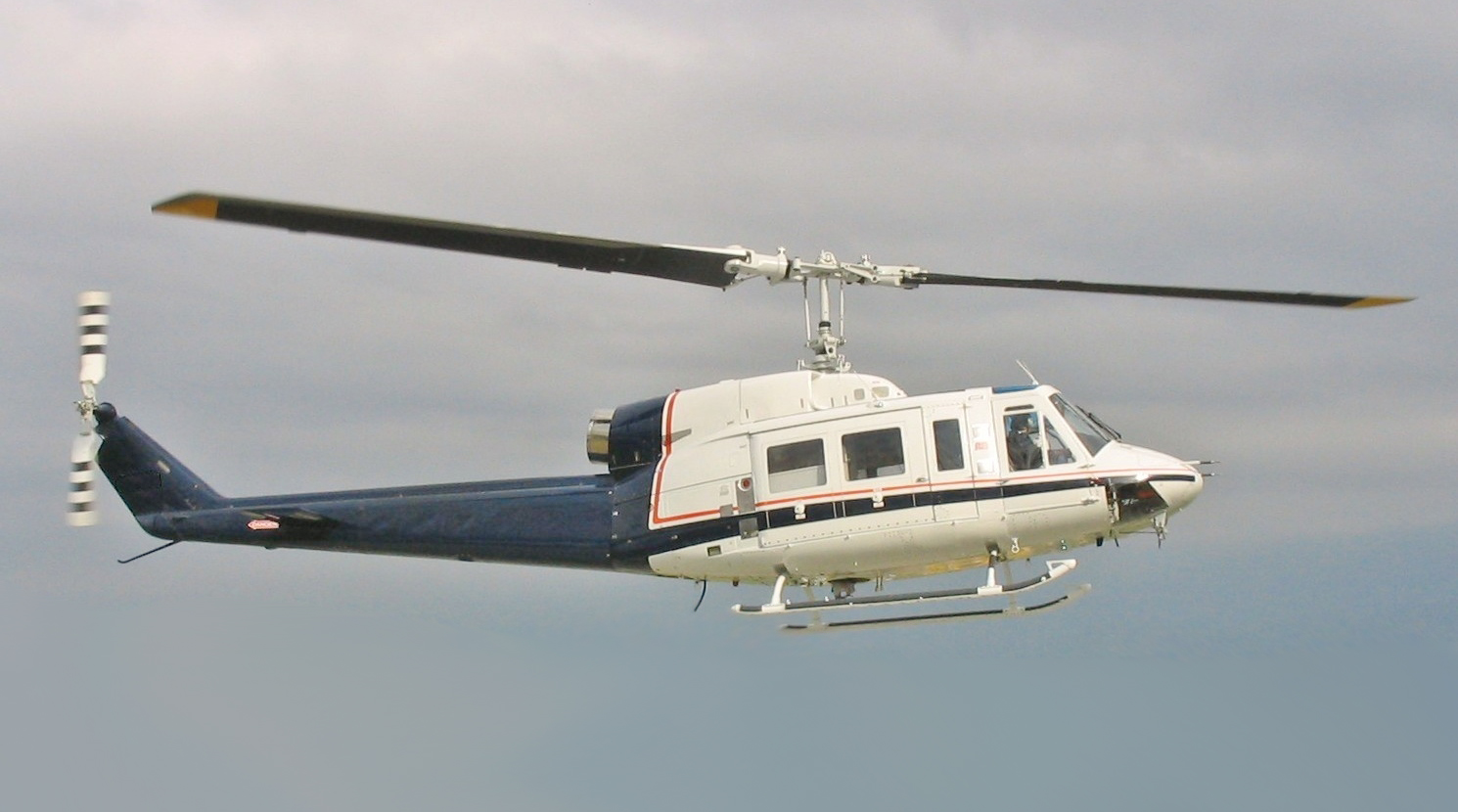
A Bell 214B

The original development of the Model 214 was announced by Bell in 1970 under the name "Huey Plus". The first prototype was based on a Bell 205 airframe equipped with a Lycoming T53-L-702 engine of 1,900 shp.

The first Bell 214A demonstration prototype followed and was evaluated in Iran during field exercises with the Imperial Iranian Armed Forces. The trial was judged successful and a resulting order for 287 Bell 214As was received. The intention was that these aircraft would be constructed by Bell in their Dallas-Fort Worth facility and that a further 50 Bell 214As and 350 Bell 214ST helicopters would then be built in Iran. In the event, 296 Bell 214A and 39 Bell 214C variants were delivered before the Iranian Revolution in 1979 ended the plans for Iranian production. In response, Bell opted to reorient the Bell 214 towards the civilian market instead.

Similar in size and appearance to the Bell 205 and Bell 212, the Bell 214 uses a single, more powerful Lycoming LTC4B-8 engine (2,930 shp; 2,185 kW) and upgraded rotor system, giving it a high lifting capacity and good performance at high temperatures and high altitudes. It can be identified by the single large exhaust duct and wide chord rotor blades without stabilizer bars.

Bell offered the Bell 214B "BigLifter" for civil use. It received certification in 1976. Powered by a 2,930 shp (2,183 kW) Lycoming T5508D turboshaft, it shared both the rotor drive and transmission system as the 214A. The transmission is rated at 2,050 shp (1,528 kW) for take-off, with a maximum continuous power rating of 1,850 shp (1,379 kW). The BigLifter features advanced rotor hub with elastomeric bearings; an automatic flight control system with stability augmentation; and commercial avionics.

Production of the Bell 214B ended in 1981, at which point it was supplanted by the more capable Bell 214ST "Super Transporter". In 2015, Bell enacted a license agreement with the helicopter company Erickson Inc. to provide aftermarket support for the Bell 214 platform; six years later, the type certificate was sold to Erickson.

In 2023, Erickson sold the type certificates for the 214B, 214B-1 and 214ST to the Australian helicopter specialist McDermott Aviation.

== Operational history ==
As of January 2012, 29 Bell 214s were in military service, including 25 Bell 214As with Iran, and three 214Bs with United Arab Emirates.

Approximately 43 Bell 214Bs are in commercial service. User countries are Australia (15), Canada (10), Singapore (3) and United States (15).

== Variants ==
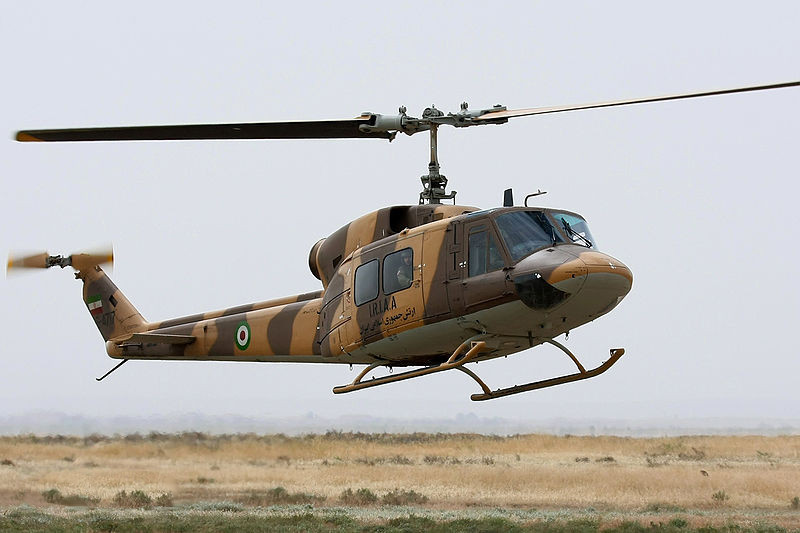
A Bell 214 of the Islamic Republic of Iran Army Aviation.

- Bell 214 Huey Plus - The prototype 214 flew in 1970. Powered by one Lycoming T53-L-702 turboshaft (1,900 shp/1,415 kW).
- Bell 214A/C Isfahan - The 299 Bell 214As for the Imperial Iranian Army Aviation were built beginning in 1972, followed by 39 Bell 214Cs with a hoist (winch) and other search and rescue equipment for the Imperial Iranian Air Force.
- Bell 214B BigLifter - Civil variant of the 214A. 70 built.
- Bell 214B-1 - This variant of the Bell Model 214B is limited to a maximum 12,500 lb (5,670 kg) gross weight with an internal load due to different certification standards. The external load is the same as the 214B. The only difference between the 214B and 214B-1 is the dataplate, and flight manual.

== Operators ==
Australia

- McDermott Aviation
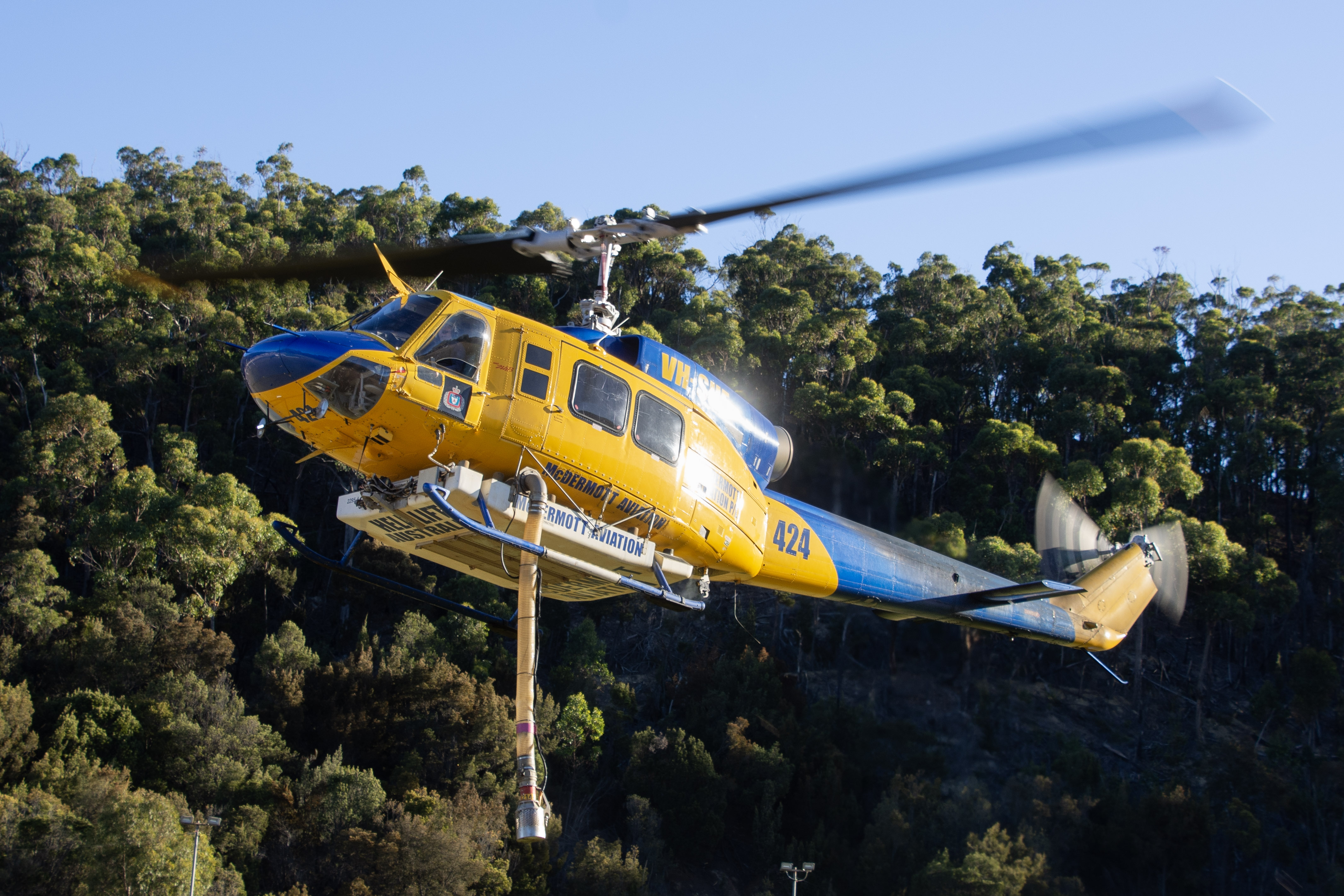
  McDermott Aviation Bell 214, VH-SUF taking off after refuelling.

Iran

- Islamic Republic of Iran Army Aviation

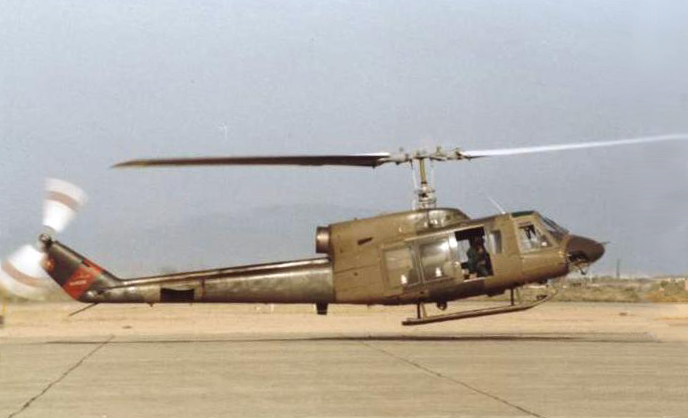
Bell 214 in Oman, 1982

=== Former operators ===
Ecuador

- Ecuadorian Army

Indonesia

- National Disaster Management Authority - Rented from McDermott Aviation.

Pahlavi Iran

- Imperial Iranian Army Aviation

Oman

- Royal Air Force of Oman

Philippines

- Philippine Air Force - 2 units for Search and Rescue and Aerial Firefighting.

United Arab Emirates

- United Arab Emirates Air Force

== Specifications (214A) ==

Data from The International Directory of Civil Aircraft

General characteristics

- Crew: 2
- Capacity: 3,880 lb (1,760 kg), including 14 troops, or six stretchers, or equivalent cargo
- Length: 48 ft 0 in (14.63 m)
- Height: 12 ft 10 in (3.91 m)
- Empty weight: 7,588 lb (3,442 kg)
- Gross weight: 13,800 lb (6,260 kg)
- Max takeoff weight: 15,000 lb (6,804 kg) with slung load
- Powerplant: 1 × Lycoming LTC4B-8D turboshaft engine, 2,930 shp (2,180 kW)
- Main rotor diameter: 50 ft (15 m)
- Main rotor area: 1,963.75 sq ft (182.438 m^{2})
- Blade section: - Wortmann FX 69-H-098

Performance

- Cruise speed: 140 kn (160 mph, 260 km/h)
- Range: 222 nmi (255 mi, 411 km) at 16,400 ft (5,000 m) density altitude
- Service ceiling: 16,400 ft (5,000 m)

== See also ==
Related development

- Bell 214ST
- Bell 204/205
- Bell 212
- Bell UH-1 Iroquois
- Bell UH-1N Twin Huey
