= EMT Luna X-2000 =

German unmanned surveillance and reconnaissance aerial vehicle

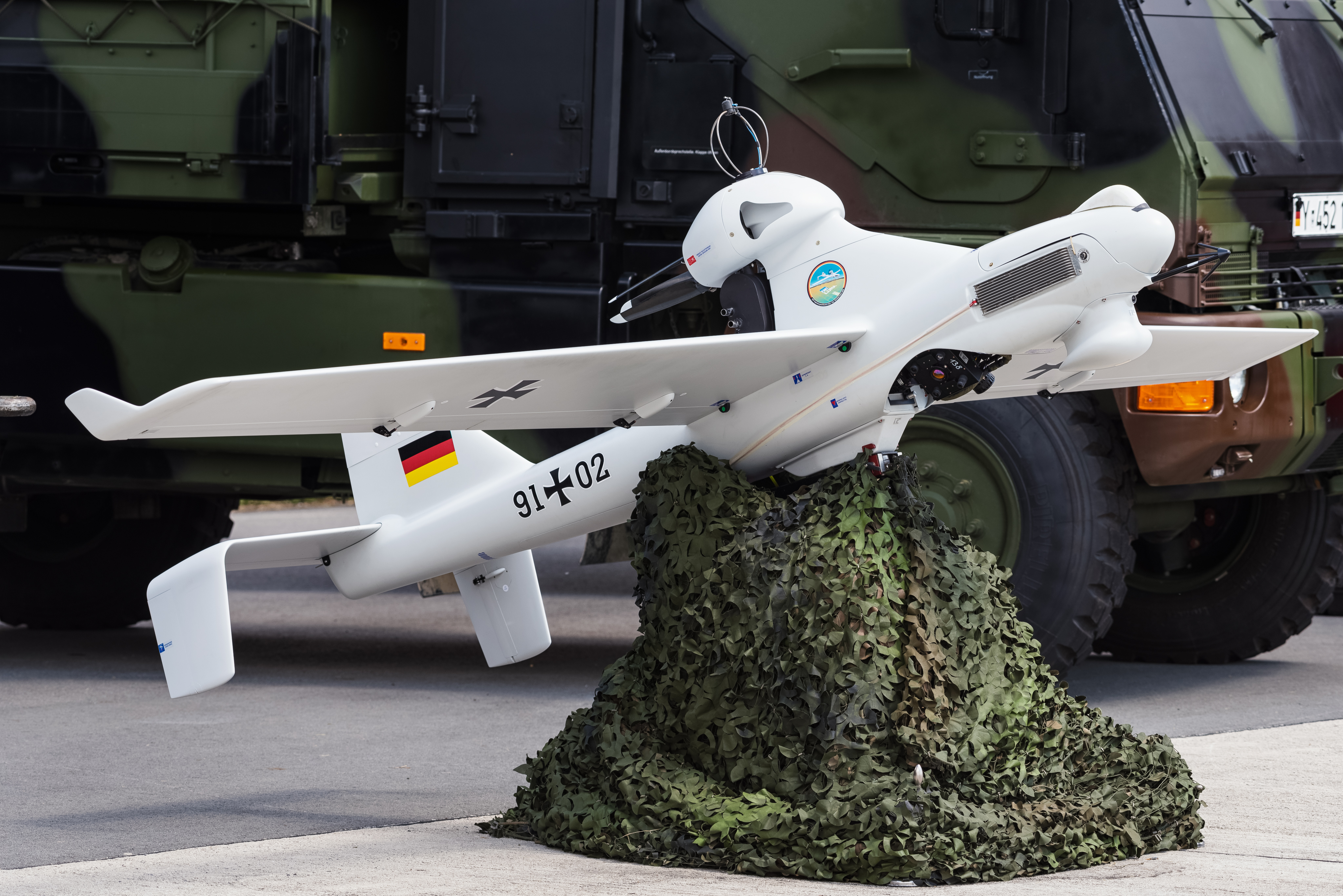
Luna X 2000 UAV for reconnaissance and ESM missions of the German Army

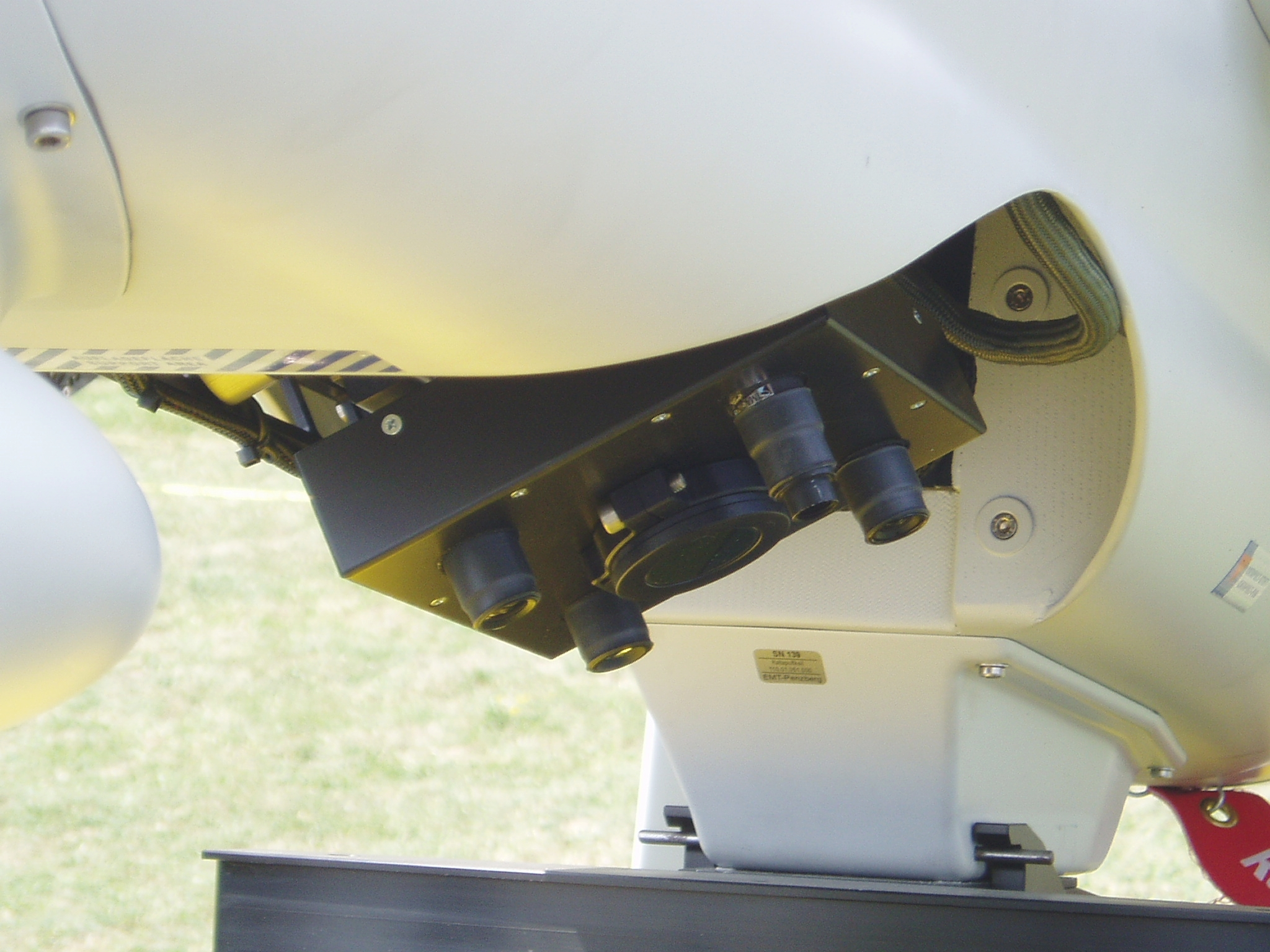
The camera of Luna

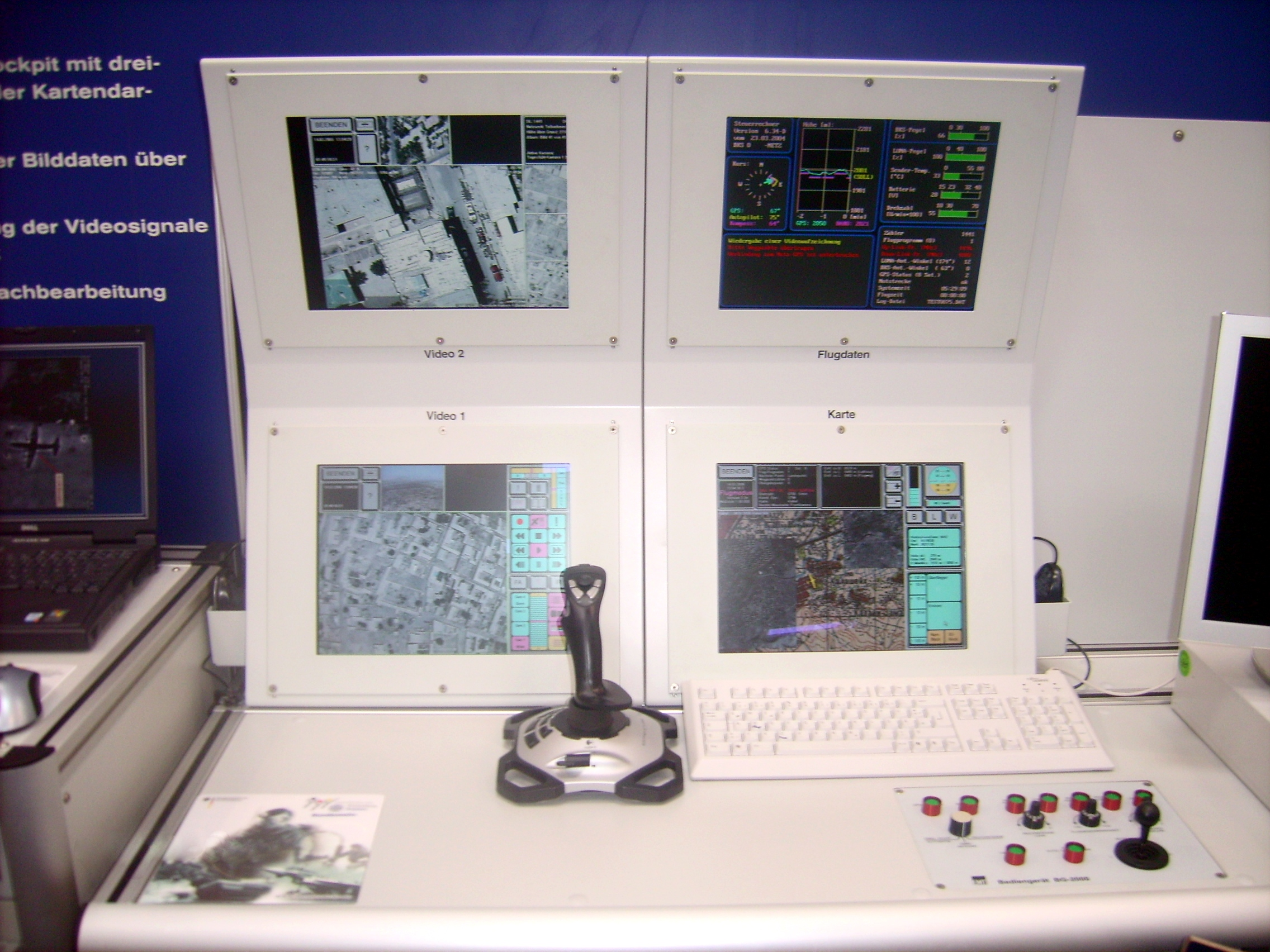
The control unit

Luna X 2000 is a German unmanned surveillance and reconnaissance aerial vehicle in service with the Bundeswehr (German Army) and produced by EMT Penzberg of Germany.

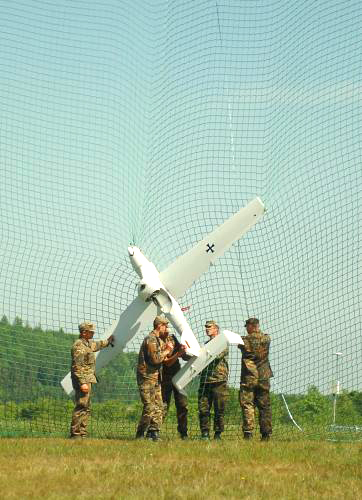
Luna recovered by soldiers of the German Army

It is intended for close reconnaissance (over the hill, up to 65 kilometres (40 mi) away), transmitting live video data (visual or infrared) or taking higher resolution still images, but it can also perform other tasks such as particle sampling, ESM/Electronic countermeasures (radio/radar jamming), depending on its payload.

The UAV is launched with a simple bungee catapult and then follows a preprogrammed course, that can be altered in flight if necessary. After its mission it automatically lands with the help of a parachute and impact dampers.

Luna X UAVs are in use by German KFOR forces since 2000 and were also used by German troops in Afghanistan.

In mid-2009 the German Army ordered another 4 systems with a total of 40 UAVs.

The Pakistan Navy signed a contract on the 27 June 2012 with EMT for purchase of LUNA UAV Systems.

Houthi fighters reportedly shot down a Luna drone operated by Saudi Arabia, where they are produced under license, in Yemen around February 12, 2019.

In 2019 the German Army began the replacement of Luna and Rheinmetall KZO with the new Luna NG, which has much increased capabilities.

In April 2023, Rheinmetall unveiled plans to develop a drone carrier based on the Luna NG that acts as a mothership to carry and deploy up to eight rotary wing loitering munitions in order to deliver them beyond ranges they would be capable of traveling themselves.

On 14 August 2023, Rheinmetall announced it will supply the Luna drone to Ukraine in 2023.

== Specifications ==
- Propulsion: two cylinder two stroke engine, driving pusher propeller
- Typical speed: 70 kilometres per hour (43 mph)
- Service ceiling: 3,500 metres (11,500 ft) AMSL
- Endurance: 6 hours (8 hours optional)
- Length: 2.36 metres (7 ft 9 in)
- Wingspan: 4.17 metres (13.7 ft)
- Take-off weight: < 40 kilograms (88 lb)
- Data Link range: > 100 kilometres (62 mi) (dependent on line of sight)
