= Mil Mi-24 =

Family of assault and attack helicopters

Mil Mi-24 / Mi-25 / Mi-35
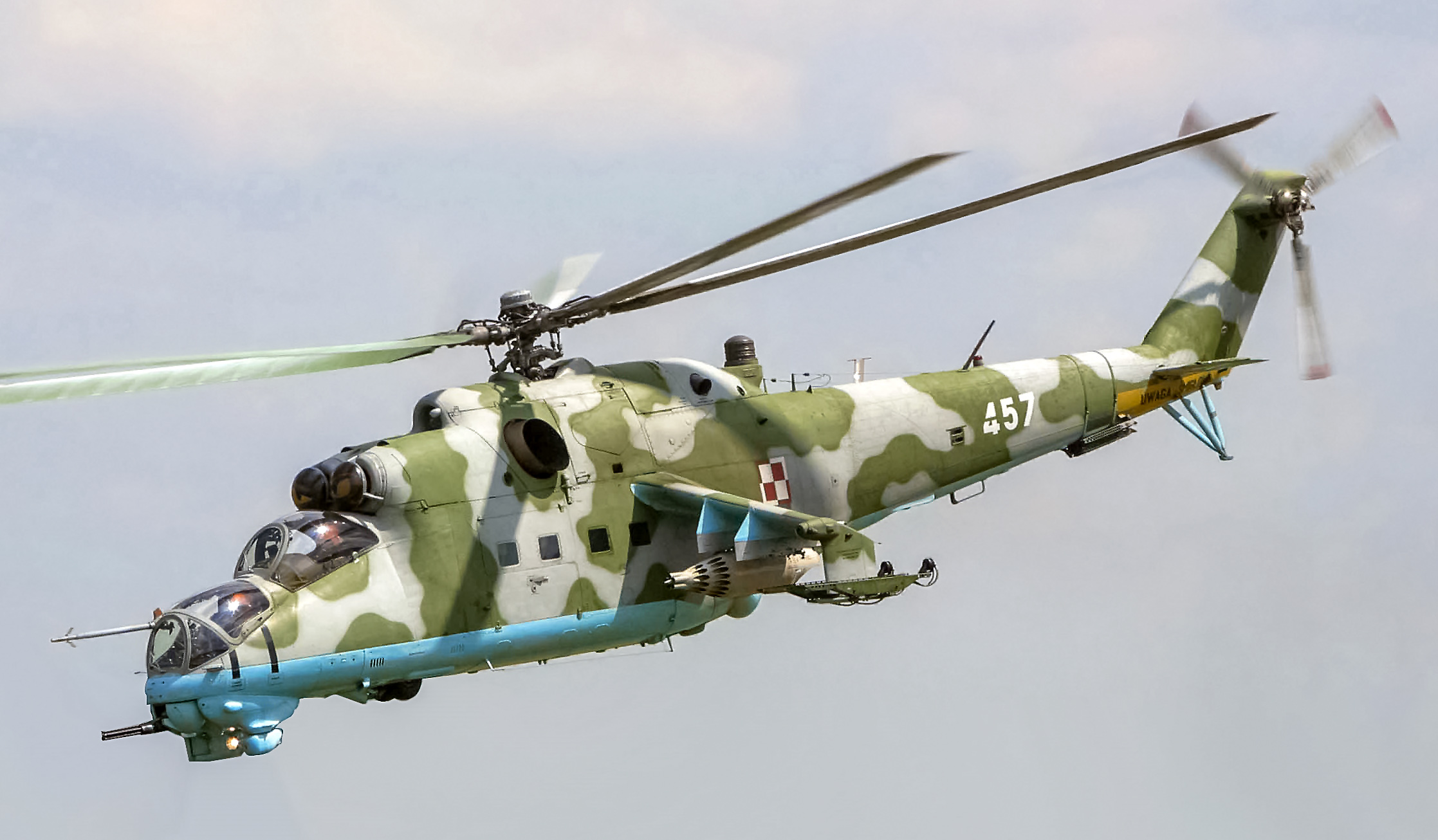
- A Mi-24V of the Polish Land Forces

General information
- Type: Attack helicopter with transport capabilities, helicopter gunship
- National origin: Soviet Union/Russia
- Manufacturer: Mil
- Status: In service
- Primary users: Russian Aerospace Forces 58 other users (see Operators section below)
- Number built: 2,648

History
- Manufactured: 1969–present
- Introduction date: 1972
- First flight: 19 September 1969
- Developed from: Mil Mi-8

The Mil Mi-24 (Russian: Миль Ми-24; NATO reporting name: Hind) is a large helicopter gunship, attack helicopter and low-capacity troop transport with room for eight passengers. It is produced by Mil Moscow Helicopter Plant and was introduced by the Soviet Air Force in 1972. As of 2026, the helicopter is used worldwide by 52 countries.

In NATO circles, the export versions, Mi-25 and Mi-35, are denoted with a letter suffix as "Hind D" and "Hind E". Soviet pilots called the Mi-24 the "flying tank" (Russian: летающий танк, romanized: letayushchiy tank), a term used historically with the famous World War II Soviet Il-2 Shturmovik armored ground attack aircraft. Other common unofficial nicknames were "Galina" (or "Galya"), "Crocodile" (Russian: Крокодил, romanized: Krokodil), due to the helicopter's camouflage scheme, and "Drinking Glass" (Russian: Стакан, romanized: Stakan), because of the flat glass plates that surround earlier Mi-24 variants' cockpits.

== Development ==
During the early 1960s, it became apparent to Soviet designer Mikhail Mil that the trend towards ever-increasing battlefield mobility would result in the creation of flying infantry fighting vehicles, which could be used to perform both fire support and infantry transport missions. The first expression of this concept was a mock-up unveiled in 1966 in the experimental department of the Ministry of Aircraft's factory number 329, where Mil was head designer. The mock-up designated V-24 was based on another project, the V-22 utility helicopter, which never flew. The V-24 had a central infantry compartment that could hold eight troops sitting back to back, and a set of small wings positioned to the top rear of the passenger cabin, capable of holding up to six missiles or rockets and a twin-barreled GSh-23L cannon fixed to the landing skid.

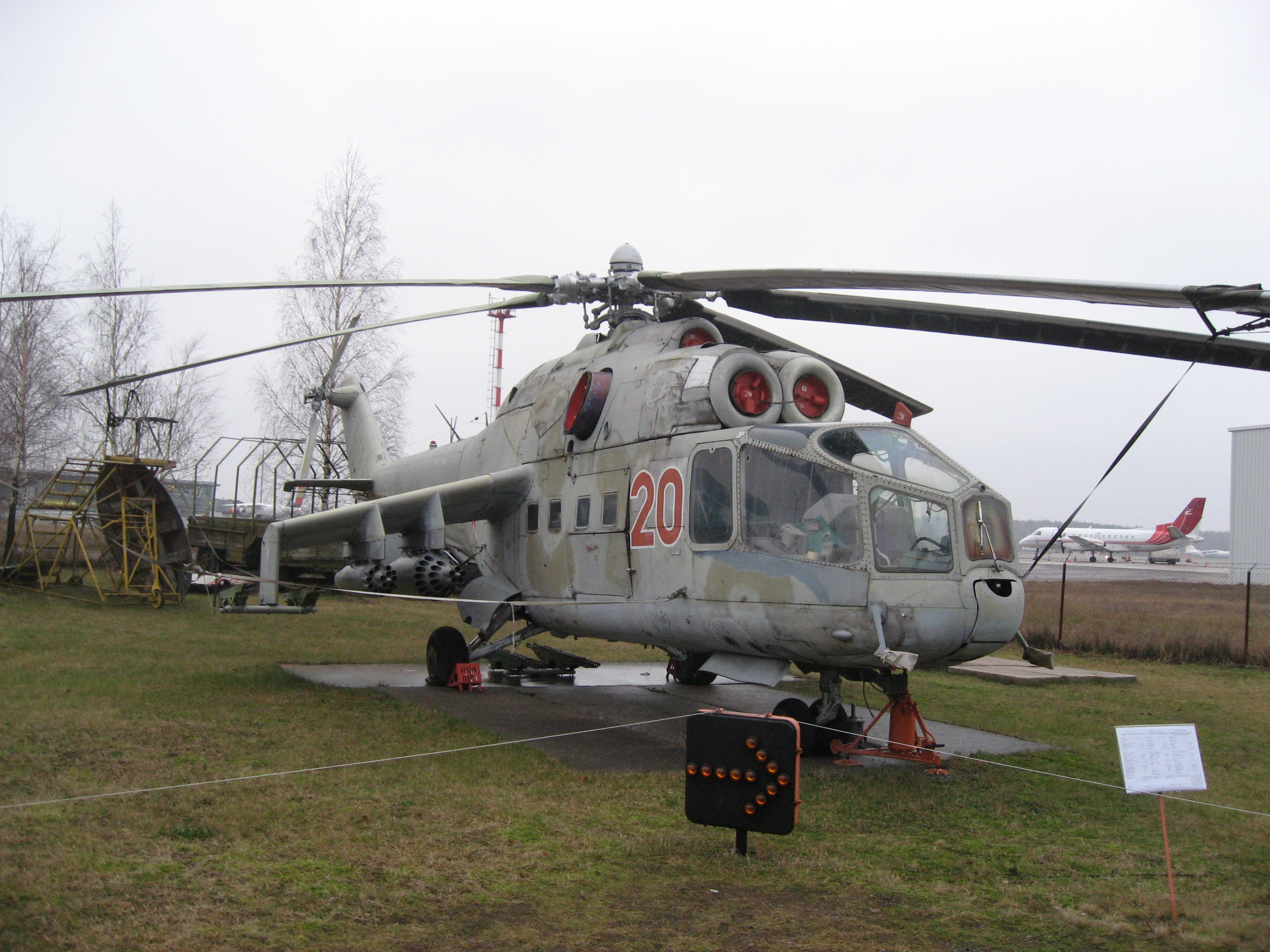
Mil Mi-24A on display at Riga Aviation Museum in Latvia

Mil proposed the design to the heads of the Soviet armed forces. While he had the support of a number of strategists, he was opposed by several more senior members of the armed forces, who believed that conventional weapons were a better use of resources. Despite the opposition, Mil managed to persuade the defence minister's first deputy, Marshal Andrey A. Grechko, to convene an expert panel to look into the matter. While the panel's opinions were mixed, supporters of the project eventually held sway and a request for design proposals for a battlefield support helicopter was issued. The development and use of gunships and attack helicopters by the US Army during the Vietnam War convinced the Soviets of the advantages of armed helicopter ground support, and fostered support for the development of the Mi-24.

Mil engineers prepared two basic designs: a 7-ton single-engine design and a 10.5-ton twin-engine design, both based on the 1,300 kW (1,700 hp) Izotov TV3-177A turboshaft. Later, three complete mock-ups were produced, along with five cockpit mock-ups to allow the pilot and weapon station operator positions to be fine-tuned.

The Kamov design bureau suggested an army version of their Ka-25 ASW helicopter as a low-cost option. This was considered but later dropped in favor of the new Mil twin-engine design. A number of changes were made at the insistence of the military, including the replacement of the 23 mm cannon with a rapid-fire heavy machine gun mounted in a chin turret, and the use of the 9K114 Shturm (AT-6 Spiral) antitank missile.

A directive was issued on 6 May 1968 to proceed with the development of the twin-engine design. Work proceeded under Mil until his death in 1970. Detailed design work began in August 1968 under the codename Yellow 24. A full-scale mock-up of the design was reviewed and approved in February 1969. Flight tests with a prototype began on 15 September 1969 with a tethered hover, and four days later the first free flight was conducted. A second prototype was built, followed by a test batch of ten helicopters.

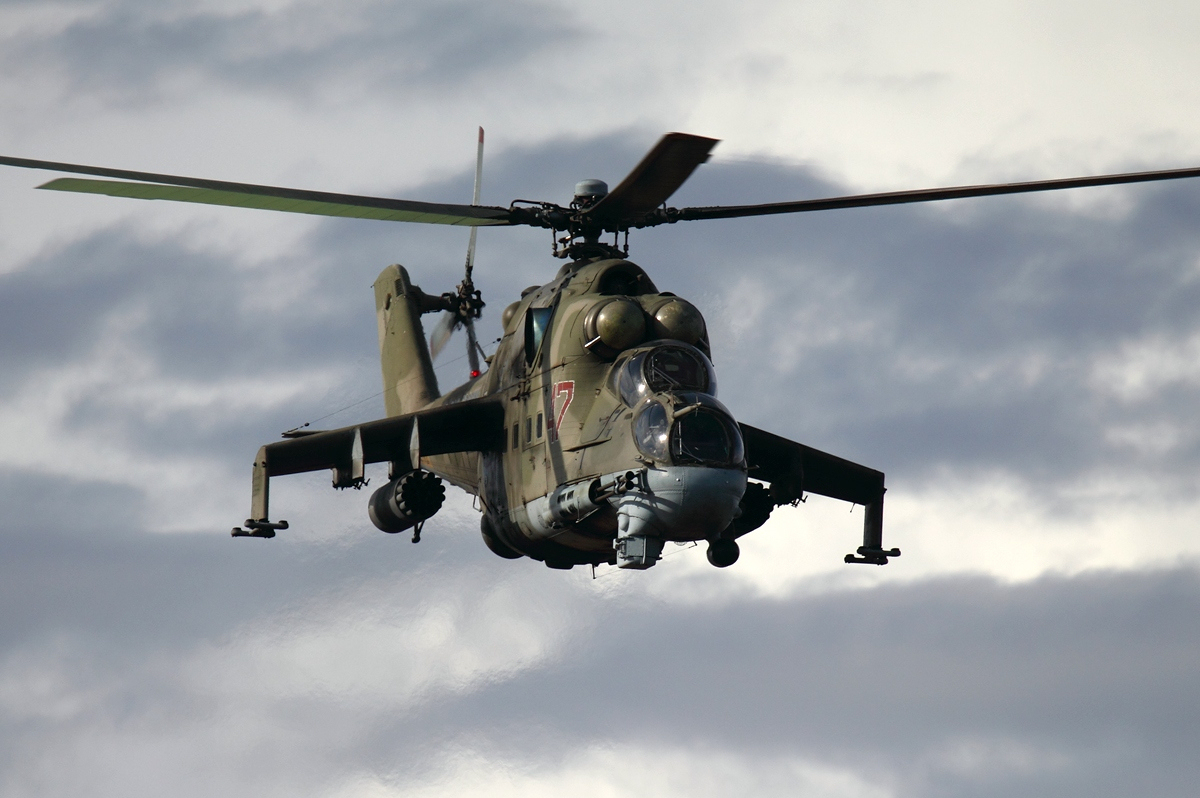
Russian Air Force Mil Mi-24P

Acceptance testing for the design began in June 1970, continuing for 18 months. Changes made in the design addressed structural strength, fatigue problems and vibration levels. Also, a 12-degree anhedral was introduced to the wings to address the aircraft's tendency to Dutch roll at speeds in excess of 200 km/h (124 mph), and the Falanga missile pylons were moved from the fuselage to the wingtips. The tail rotor was moved from the right to the left side of the tail, and the rotation direction reversed. The tail rotor now rotated up on the side towards the front of the aircraft, into the downwash of the rotor, which increased its efficiency. A number of other design changes were made until the production version Mi-24A (izdeliye 245) entered production in 1970, obtaining its initial operating capability in 1971 and was officially accepted into the state arsenal in 1972.

In 1972, following completion of the Mi-24, development began on a unique attack helicopter with transport capability. The new design had a reduced transport capability (three troops instead of eight) and was called the Mi-28, and that of the Ka-50 attack helicopter, which is smaller and more maneuverable and does not have the large cabin for carrying troops. In October 2007, the Russian Air Force announced it would replace its Mi-24 fleet with Mi-28Ns and Ka-52s by 2015. However, after the successful operation of the type in Syria it was decided to keep it in service and upgrade it with new electronics, sights, arms and night vision goggles.

== Design ==
=== Overview ===
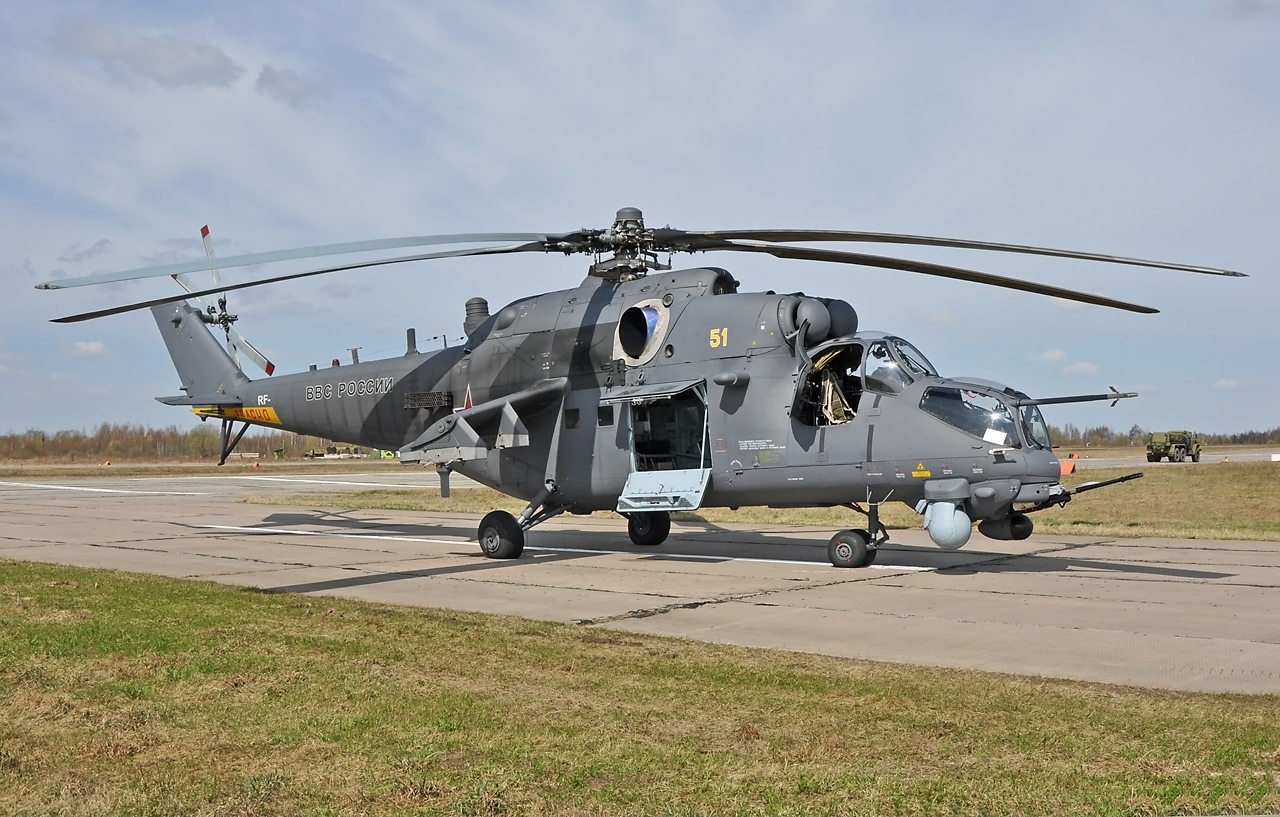
Russian Air Force Mi-35М

The core of the aircraft was derived from the Mil Mi-8 (NATO reporting name "Hip") with two top-mounted turboshaft engines driving a mid-mounted 17.3 m (57 ft) five-blade main rotor and a three-blade tail rotor. The engine configuration gave the aircraft its distinctive double air intake. Original versions have an angular greenhouse-style cockpit; Model D and later have a characteristic tandem cockpit with a "double bubble" canopy. Other airframe components came from the Mi-14 "Haze". Two mid-mounted stub wings provide weapon hardpoints, each offering three stations, in addition to providing lift. The loadout mix is mission dependent; Mi-24s can be tasked with close air support, antitank operations, or aerial combat.

The Mi-24's titanium rotor blades are resistant to 12.7 mm (.50 caliber) rounds. The cockpit is protected by ballistic-resistant windscreens and a titanium-armored tub. The cockpit and crew compartment are overpressurized to protect the crew in NBC conditions.

=== Flight characteristics ===
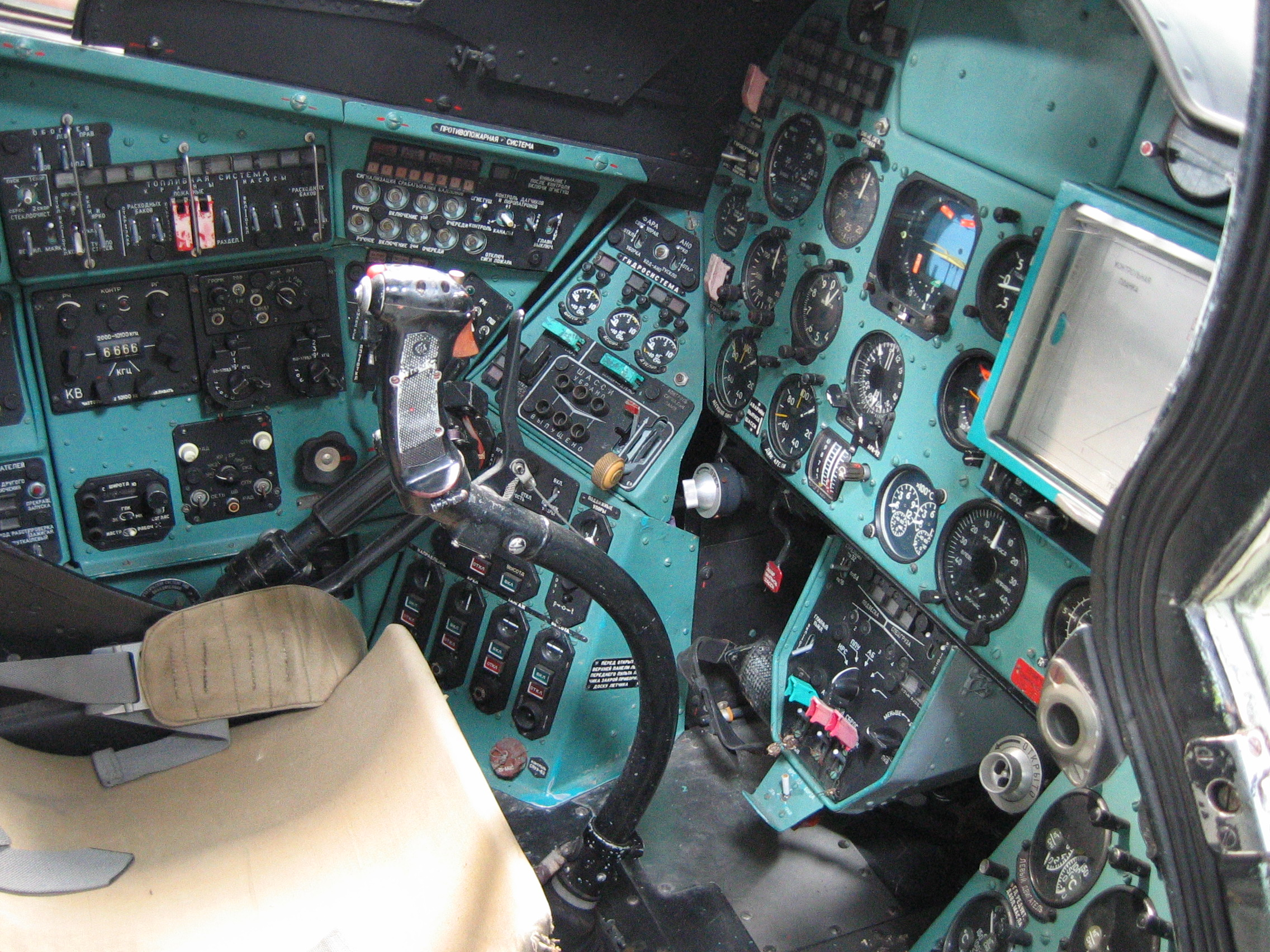
Mi-24D cockpit

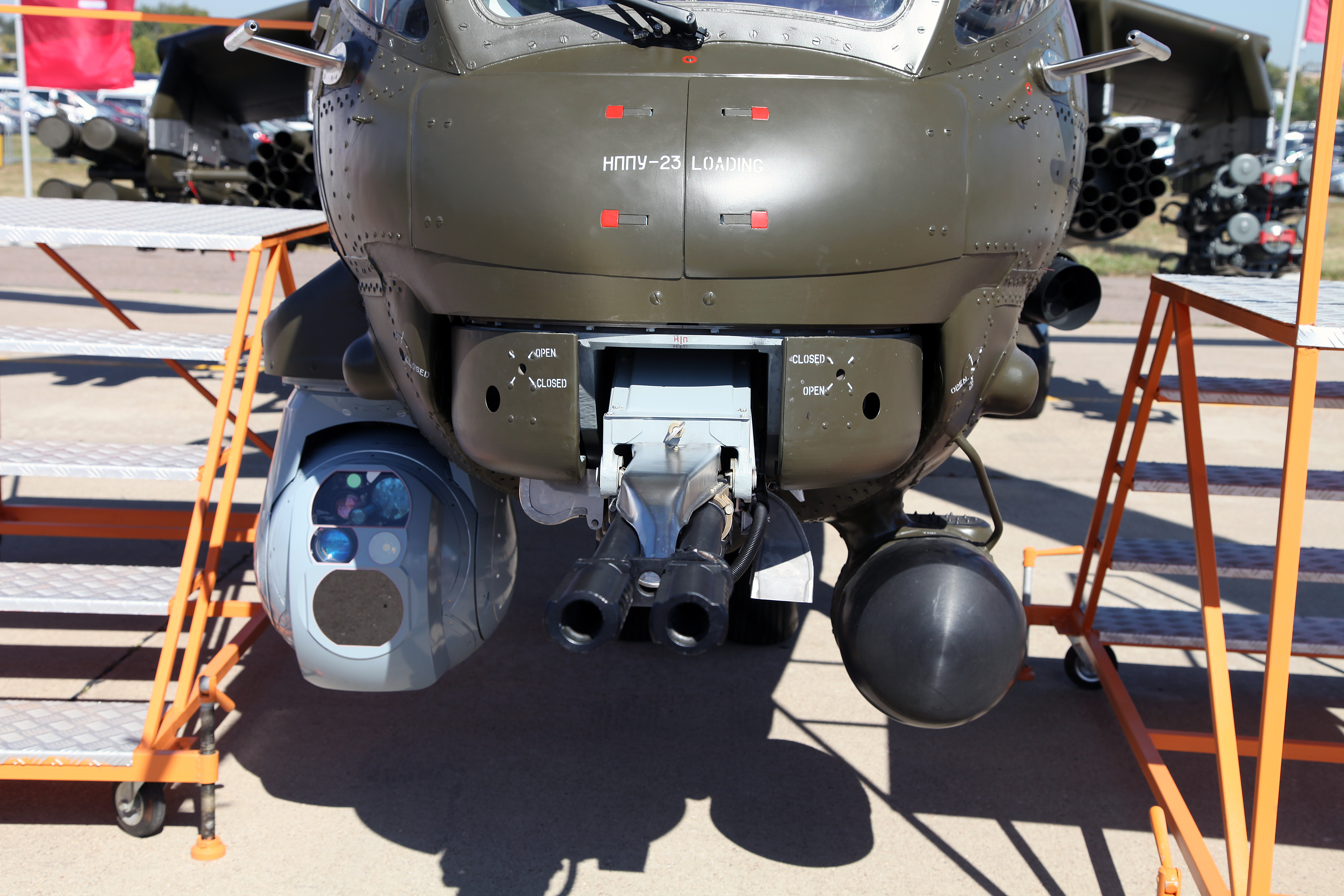
Mi-35M with the OPS-24N survey and sighting system together with the gyrostabilized OLS GOES-324

Considerable attention was given to making the Mi-24 fast. The airframe was streamlined, and fitted with retractable tricycle undercarriage landing gear to reduce drag. At high speed, the wings provide considerable lift (up to a quarter of total lift). The main rotor was tilted 2.5° to the right from the fuselage to compensate for translating tendency at a hover. The landing gear was also tilted to the left so that the rotor would still be level when the aircraft was on the ground, making the rest of the airframe tilt to the left. The tail was also asymmetrical to give a side force at speed, thus unloading the tail rotor.

A modified Mi-24B, named A-10, was used in several speed and time-to-climb world record attempts. The helicopter had been modified to reduce weight as much as possible—one measure was the removal of the stub wings. The previous official speed record was set on 13 August 1975 over a closed 1,000 km (620 mi) course of 332.65 km/h (206.70 mph); many of the female-specific records were set by the all-female crew of Galina Rastorguyeva and Lyudmila Polyanskaya. On 21 September 1978, the A-10 set the absolute speed record for helicopters with 368.4 km/h (228.9 mph) over a 15/25 km course. The record stood until 1986, when it was broken by the current official record holder, a modified British Westland Lynx.

=== Comparison to Western helicopters ===
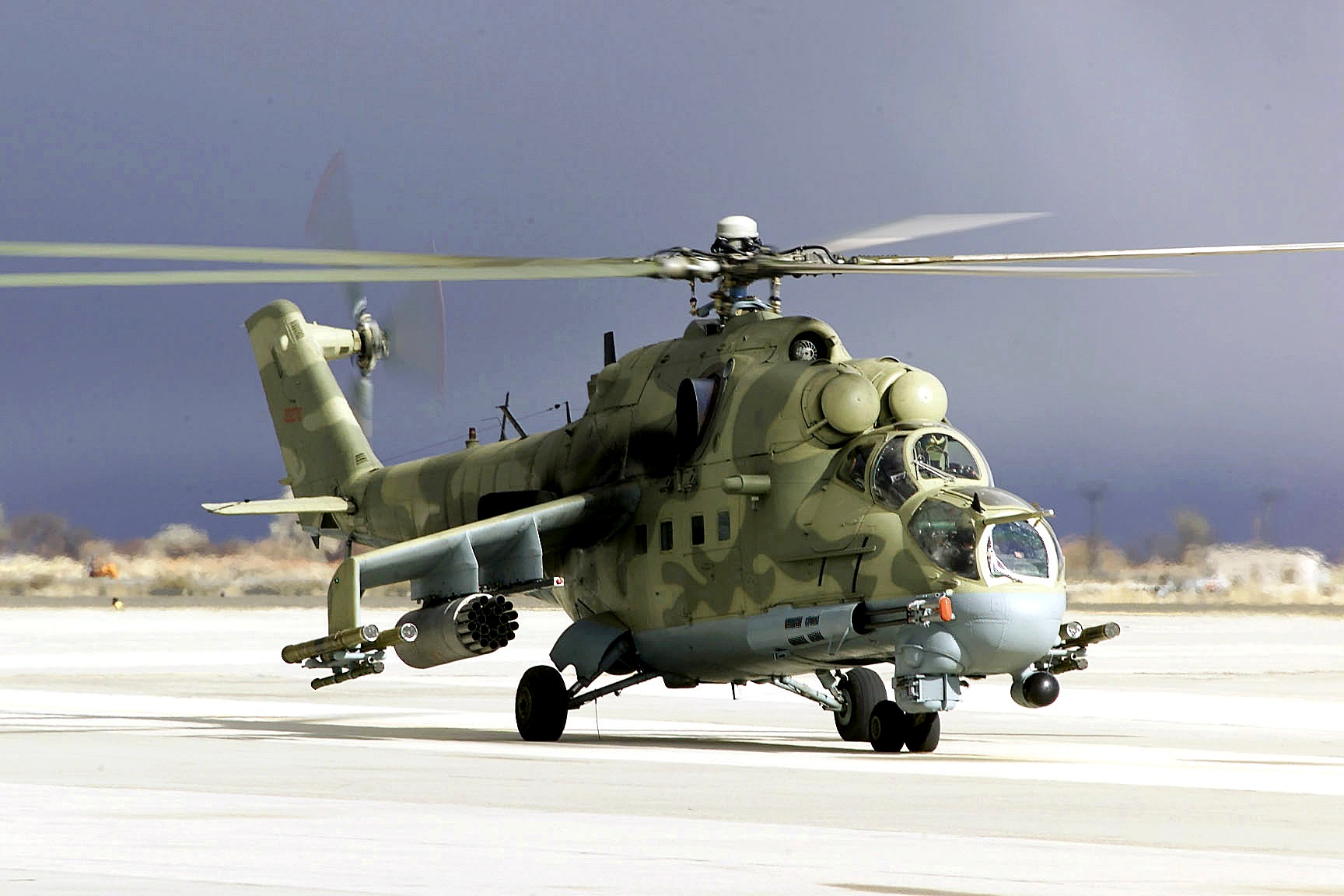
U.S. operated Mi-24P Hind-F

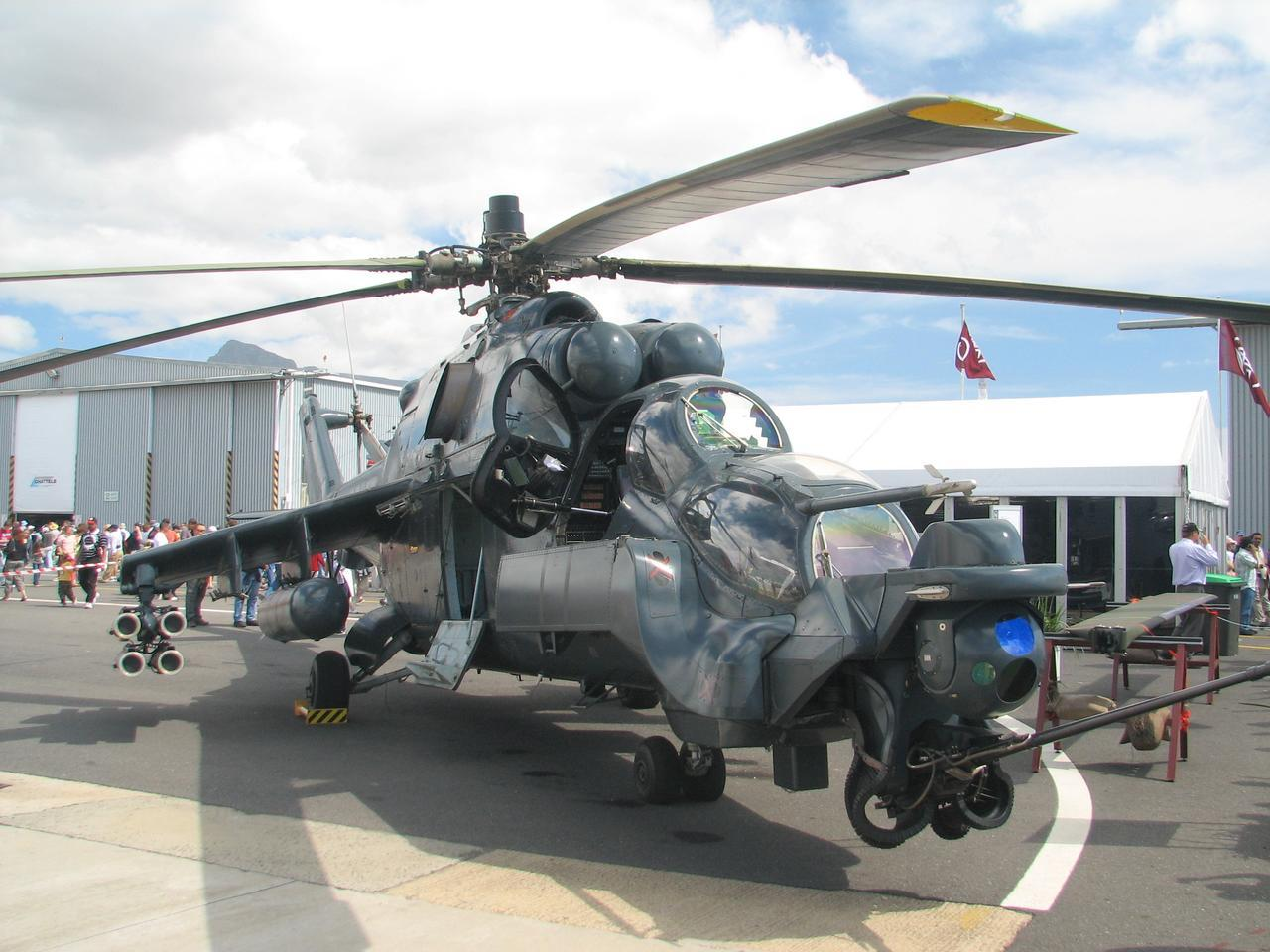
Mi-24 SuperHind, a modernized Hind by the South African firm ATE. At the Ysterplaat Airshow 2006.

As a combination of armoured gunship and troop transport, the Mi-24 has no direct NATO counterpart. While the UH-1 ("Huey") helicopters were used by the US in the Vietnam War either to ferry troops, or as gunships, they were not able to do both at the same time. Converting a UH-1 into a gunship meant stripping the entire passenger area to accommodate extra fuel and ammunition, and removing its troop transport capability. The Mi-24 was designed to do both, and this was greatly exploited by airborne units of the Soviet Army during the 1980–89 Soviet–Afghan War. The closest Western equivalent was the American Sikorsky S-67 Blackhawk, which used many of the same design principles and was also built as a high-speed, high-agility attack helicopter with limited troop transport capability using many components from the existing Sikorsky S-61. The S-67, however, was never adopted for service. Other Western equivalents are the Romanian Army's IAR 330, which is a licence-built armed version of the Aérospatiale SA 330 Puma, and the MH-60 Direct Action Penetrator, a special purpose armed variant of the Sikorsky UH-60 Black Hawk.

== Operational history ==
=== Ogaden War (1977–1978) ===
The first combat use of the Mi-24 was with the Ethiopian forces during the Ogaden War against Somalia. The helicopters formed part of a massive airlift of military equipment from the Soviet Union, after the Soviets switched sides towards the end of 1977.

The Mi-24s were flown by Soviet pilots and proved to be instrumental in the combined air and ground assault that allowed the Ethiopians to retake the Ogaden by the beginning of 1978. Cuban and East German aircrews reportedly also flew the helicopters during the war. They were used with great success in targeting Somali armor and artillery positions.

=== Chadian–Libyan conflict (1978–1987) ===
The Libyan air force used Mi-24A and Mi-25 units during their numerous interventions in Chad's civil war. The Mi-24s were first used in October 1980 in the battle of N'Djamena, where they helped the People's Armed Forces seize the capital.

In March 1987, the Armed Forces of the North, which were backed by the US and France, captured a Libyan air force base at Ouadi-Doum in Northern Chad. Among the aircraft captured during this raid were three Mi-25s. These were supplied to France, which in turn sent one to the United Kingdom and one to the US.

=== Soviet war in Afghanistan (1979–1989) ===
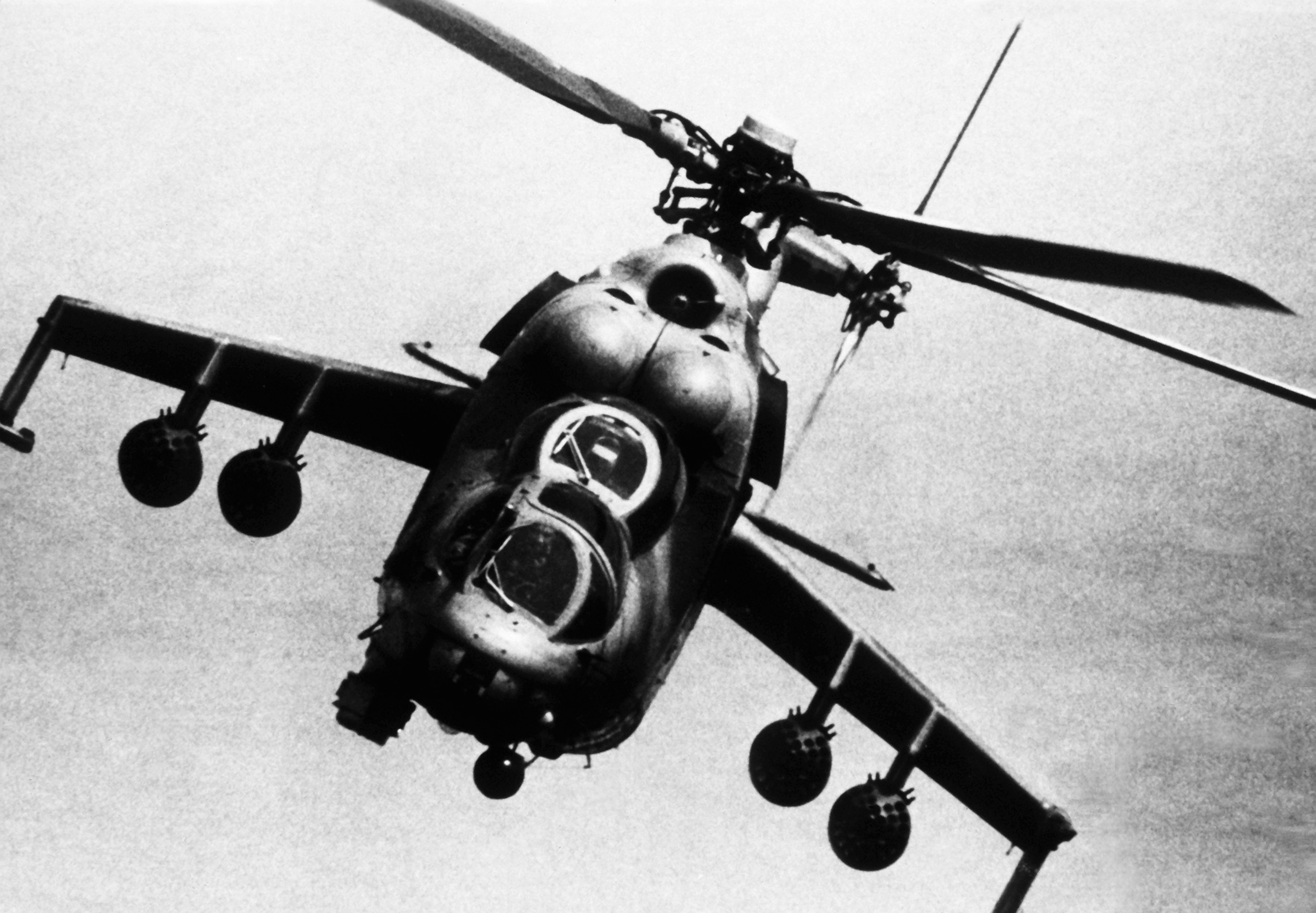
Front view of a Soviet Mi-24 HIND E ground attack helicopter

The aircraft was operated extensively during the Soviet–Afghan War, mainly for bombing Mujahideen fighters. When the U.S. supplied heat-seeking Stinger missiles to the Mujahideen, the Soviet Mi-8 and Mi-24 helicopters proved to be favorite targets of the rebels.

It is difficult to find the total number of Mi-24s used in Afghanistan. At the end of 1990, the whole Soviet Army had 1,420 Mi-24s. During the Afghan war, sources estimated the helicopter strength to be as much as 600 units, with up to 250 being Mi-24s, whereas a (formerly secret) 1987 Central Intelligence Agency (CIA) report says that the number of Mi-24s in theatre increased from 85 in 1980 to 120 in 1985.

==== First deployment and combat ====
In April 1979, Mi-24s were supplied to the Afghan government to deal with Mujahideen guerrillas. The Afghan pilots were well-trained and made effective use of their machines, but the Mujahideen were not easy targets. The first Mi-24 to be lost in action was shot down by guerrillas on 18 July 1979.

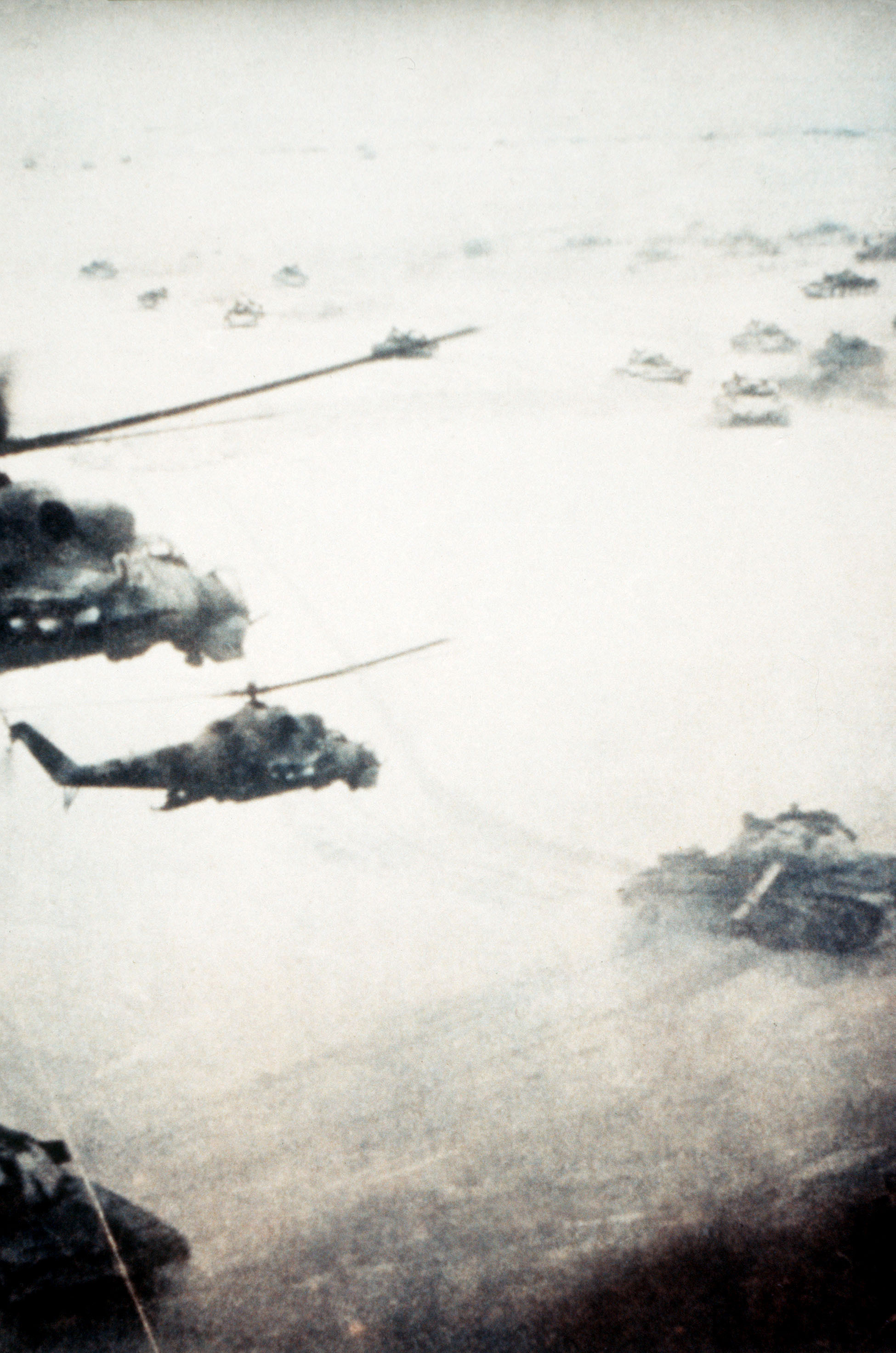
Soviet "Helicopter-tank" operation in Afghanistan

Despite facing strong resistance from Afghan rebels, the Mi-24 proved to be very destructive. The rebels called the Mi-24 "Shaitan-Arba (Satan's Chariot)". In one case, an Mi-24 pilot who was out of ammunition managed to rescue a company of infantry by maneuvering aggressively towards Mujahideen guerrillas and scaring them off. The Mi-24 was popular with ground troops, since it could stay on the battlefield and provide fire as needed, while "fast mover" strike jets could only stay for a short time before heading back to base to refuel.

The Mi-24's favoured munition was the 80-millimetre (3.1 in) S-8 rocket, the 57 mm (2.2 in) S-5 having proven too light to be effective. The 23 mm (0.91 in) gun pod was also popular. Extra rounds of rocket ammunition were often carried internally so that the crew could land and self-reload in the field. The Mi-24 could carry ten 100-kilogram (220 lb) iron bombs for attacks on camps or strongpoints, while harder targets could be dealt with a load of four 250-kilogram (550 lb) or two 500-kilogram (1,100 lb) iron bombs. Some Mi-24 crews became experts at dropping bombs precisely on targets. Fuel-air explosive bombs were also used in a few instances, though crews initially underestimated the sheer blast force of such weapons and were caught by the shock waves. The 9K114 Shturm was used infrequently, largely due to a lack of targets early in the war that required the precision and range the missile offered and a need to keep stocks of antitank missiles in Europe. After the Mujahideen got access to more advanced antiaircraft weapons later in the war the Shturm was used more often by Mi-24 units.

Combat experience quickly demonstrated the disadvantages of having an Mi-24 carrying troops. Gunship crews found the soldiers a concern and a distraction while being shot at, and preferred to fly lightly loaded anyway, especially given their operations from high ground altitudes in Afghanistan. Mi-24 troop compartment armour was often removed to reduce weight. Troops would be carried in Mi-8 helicopters while the Mi-24s provided fire support.

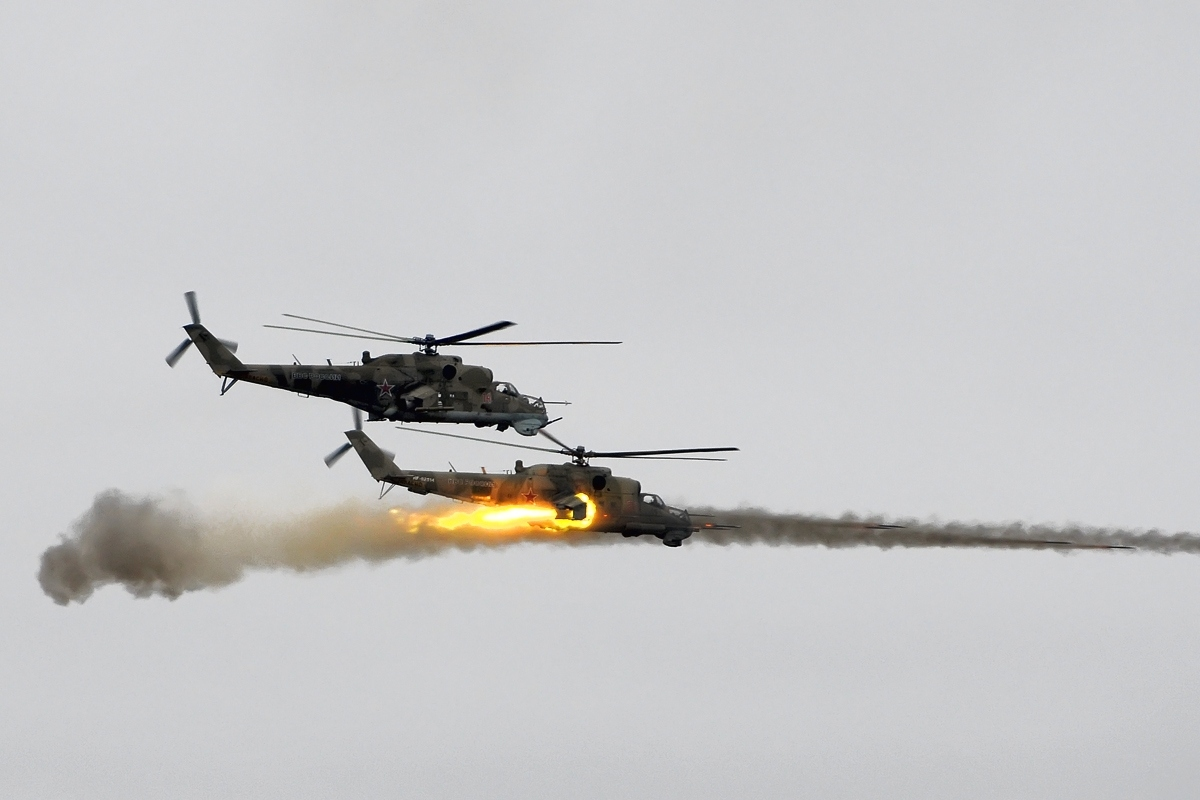
Mil Mi-24/25

It proved useful to carry a technician in the Mi-24's crew compartment to handle a light machine gun in a window port. This gave the Mi-24 some ability to "watch its back" while leaving a target area. In some cases, a light machine gun was fitted on both sides to allow the technician to move from one side to the other without having to take the machine gun with him.

This weapon configuration still left the gunship blind to the direct rear, and Mil experimented with fitting a machine gun in the back of the fuselage, accessible to the gunner through a narrow crawl-way. The experiment was highly unsuccessful, as the space was cramped, full of engine exhaust fumes, and otherwise unbearable. During a demonstration, an overweight Soviet Air Force general got stuck in the crawl-way. Operational Mi-24s were retrofitted with rear-view mirrors to help the pilot spot threats and take evasive action.

Besides protecting helicopter troop assaults and supporting ground actions, the Mi-24 also protected convoys, using rockets with flechette warheads to drive off ambushes; performed strikes on predesignated targets; and engaged in "hunter-killer" sweeps. Hunter-killer Mi-24s operated at a minimum in pairs, but were more often in groups of four or eight, to provide mutual fire support. The Mujahideen learned to move mostly at night to avoid the gunships, and in response the Soviets trained their Mi-24 crews in night-fighting, dropping parachute flares to illuminate potential targets for attack. The Mujahideen quickly caught on and scattered as quickly as possible when Soviet target designation flares were lit nearby.

==== Attrition in Afghanistan ====
The war in Afghanistan brought with it losses by attrition. The environment itself, dusty and often hot, was rough on the machines; dusty conditions led to the development of the twin PZU ('PyleZashchitnoe Ustroystvo') air intake filters. The rebels' primary air-defence weapons early in the war were heavy machine guns and antiaircraft cannons, though anything smaller than a 23 millimetre shell generally did not do much damage to an Mi-24. The cockpit glass panels were resistant to 12.7 mm (.50 in calibre) rounds.

The rebels also quickly began to use Soviet-made and US shoulder-launched, man-portable air-defense system (MANPADS) missiles such as the Strela and Redeye which had either been captured from the Soviets or their Afghan allies or were supplied from Western sources. Many of them came from stocks that the Israelis had captured during wars with Soviet backed states in the Middle East. Owing to a combination of the limited capabilities of these early types of missiles, poor training and poor material condition of the missiles, they were not particularly effective. Instead, the RPG-7, originally developed as an antitank weapon, was the first effective countermeasure to the Hind. The RPG-7, not designed for air defence, had inherent shortcomings in this role. When fired at the angles needed to hit aerial targets, the back-blast could easily wound the shooter, and the inevitable cloud of smoke and dust made it easy for gunners to spot the shooter's position.

From 1986, the CIA began supplying the Afghan rebels with newer Stinger shoulder-launched, heat-seeking SAMs. These were a marked improvement over earlier weapons. Unlike the Redeye and SA-7, which locked on to only infrared emissions, the Stinger could lock onto both infrared and ultraviolet emissions. This enabled the operator to engage an aircraft from all angles rather than just the tail and made it significantly more resistant to countermeasures like flares. In addition the Mil helicopters, particularly the Mi-24, suffered from a design flaw in the configuration of their engines that made them highly vulnerable to the Stinger. The Mi-24, along with the related Mi-8 and Mi-17 helicopters, had its engines placed in an inline configuration in an attempt to streamline the helicopter to increase speed and minimize the aircraft's overall frontal profile to incoming fire in a head on attack. However this had the effect of leaking all the exhaust gasses from the Mi-24's engines directly out the side of the aircraft and away from the helicopter's rotor wash, creating two massive sources of heat and ultraviolet radiation for the Stinger to lock onto. The inline placement of the engines was seen as so problematic in this regard that Mil designers abandoned the configuration on the planned successor to the Mi-24, the Mil Mi-28, in favour of an engine placement more akin to Western attack helicopters which vents the exhaust gasses into the helicopter's main rotor wash to dissipate heat.

Initially, the attack doctrine of the Mi-24 was to approach its target from high altitude and dive downwards. After the introduction of the Stinger, doctrine changed to "nap of the earth" flying, where they approached very low to the ground and engaged more laterally, popping up to only about 200 ft (61 m) in order to aim rockets or cannons. Countermeasure flares and missile warning systems would be installed in all Soviet Mil Mi-2, Mi-8, and Mi-24 helicopters, giving pilots a chance to evade missiles fired at them. Heat dissipation devices were also fitted to exhausts to decrease the Mi-24's heat signature. Tactical and doctrinal changes were introduced to make it harder for the enemy to deploy these weapons effectively. These reduced the Stinger threat, but did not eliminate it.

Mi-24s were also used to shield jet transports flying in and out of Kabul from Stingers. The gunships carried flares to blind the heat-seeking missiles. The crews called themselves "Mandatory Matrosovs", after a Soviet hero of World War II who threw himself across a German machine gun to let his comrades break through.

According to Russian sources, 74 helicopters were lost, including 27 shot down by Stinger and two by Redeye. In many cases, the helicopters with their armour and durable construction could withstand significant damage and able to return to base.

==== Mi-24 crews and end of Soviet involvement ====
Mi-24 crews carried AK-74 assault rifles and other hand-held weapons to give them a better chance of survival if forced down. Early in the war, Marat Tischenko, head of the Mil design bureau visited Afghanistan to see what the troops thought of his helicopters, and gunship crews put on several displays for him. They even demonstrated manoeuvres, such as barrel rolls, which design engineers considered impossible. An astounded Tischenko commented, "I thought I knew what my helicopters could do, now I'm not so sure!"

The last Soviet Mi-24 shot down was during the night of 2 February 1989, with both crewmen killed. It was also the last Soviet helicopter lost during nearly 10 years of warfare.

==== Mi-24s in Afghanistan after Soviet withdrawal ====
Two Mil Mi-35 Hind helicopters during a training sortie over southern Afghanistan, 4 October 2009. U.S. Airmen with the 438th Air Expeditionary Training Group.

Mi-24s passed on to Soviet-backed Afghan forces during the war remained in dwindling service in the grinding civil war that continued after the Soviet withdrawal.

Afghan Air Force Mi-24s in the hands of the ascendant Taliban gradually became inoperable, but a few flown by the Northern Alliance, which had Russian assistance and access to spares, remained operational up to the US invasion of Afghanistan in late 2001. In 2008, the Afghan Air Force took delivery of six refurbished Mi-35 helicopters, purchased from the Czech Republic. The Afghan pilots were trained by India and began live firing exercises in May 2009 in order to escort Mi-17 transport helicopters on operations in restive parts of the country. India would also supply four upgraded Mil-35s to the Afghan Air Force in 2015.

=== Iran–Iraq War (1980–1988) ===
The Mi-25 saw considerable use by the Iraqi Army during the long war against Iran. Its heavy armament caused severe losses to Iranian ground forces during the war. However, the Mi-25 lacked an effective antitank capability, as it was only armed with obsolete 9M17 Skorpion missiles. This led the Iraqis to develop new gunship tactics, with help from East German advisors. The Mi-25s would form "hunter-killer" teams with French-built Aérospatiale Gazelles, with the Mi-25s leading the attack and using their massive firepower to suppress Iranian air defences, and the Gazelles using their HOT missiles to engage armoured fighting vehicles. These tactics proved effective in halting Iranian offensives, such as Operation Ramadan in July 1982.

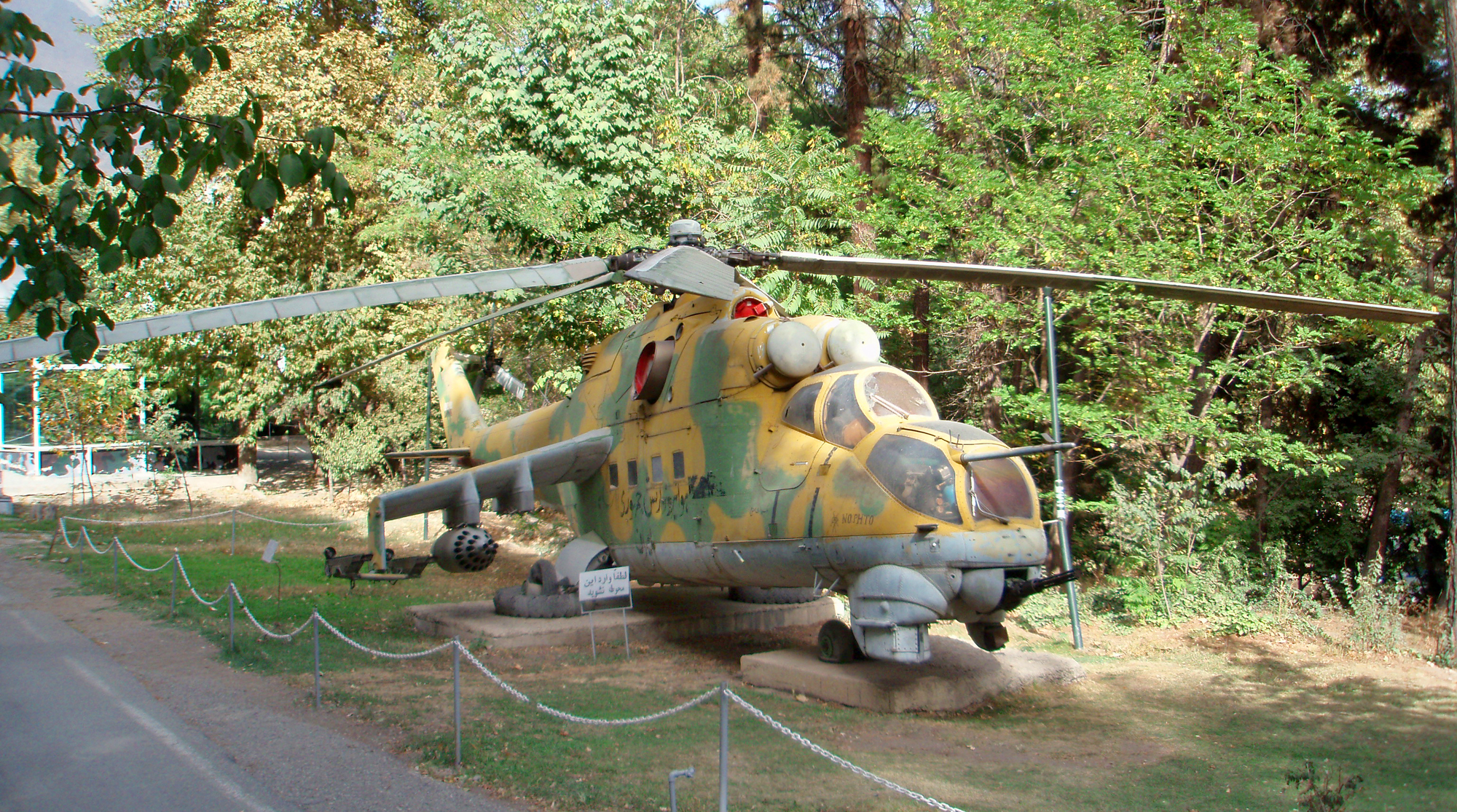
An Iraqi Mil Mi-25, brought down during the Iran–Iraq War, on display at a military museum in Tehran.

This war also saw the only confirmed air-to-air helicopter battles in history with the Iraqi Mi-25s flying against Iranian AH-1J SeaCobras (supplied by the United States before the Iranian Revolution) on several separate occasions. In November 1980, not long after Iraq's initial invasion of Iran, two Iranian SeaCobras engaged two Mi-25s with TOW wire-guided antitank missiles. One Mi-25 went down immediately, the other was badly damaged and crashed before reaching base. The Iranians repeated this accomplishment on 24 April 1981, destroying two Mi-25s without incurring losses to themselves. One Mi-25 was also downed by an IRIAF F-14A.

The Iraqis hit back, claiming the destruction of a SeaCobra on 14 September 1983 (with YaKB machine gun), then three SeaCobras on 5 February 1984 and three more on 25 February 1984 (two with Falanga missiles, one with S-5 rockets). A 1982 news article published on the Iraqi Observer claimed an Iraqi Mi-24D shot down an Iranian F-4 Phantom II using its armaments, either antitank missiles, guns or S-5 unguided rockets.

After a lull in helicopter losses, each side lost a gunship on 13 February 1986. Later, a Mi-25 claimed shooting down a SeaCobra with YaKB gun on 16 February, and a SeaCobra claimed downing a Mi-25 with rockets on 18 February. The last engagement between the two types was on 22 May 1986, when Mi-25s shot down a SeaCobra. The final claim tally was 10 SeaCobras and 6 Mi-25s destroyed. The relatively small numbers and the inevitable disputes over actual kill numbers makes it unclear if one gunship had a real technical superiority over the other. Iraqi Mi-25s also claimed 43 kills against other Iranian helicopters, such as Agusta-Bell UH-1 Hueys.

In general, the Iraqi pilots liked the Mi-25, in particular for its high speed, long range, high versatility and large weapon load, but disliked the relatively ineffectual antitank guided weapons and lack of agility.

=== Nicaraguan civil war (1980–1988) ===
Mi-25s were also used by the Nicaraguan Army during the civil war of the 1980s. Nicaragua received 12 Mi-25s (some sources claim 18) in the mid-1980s to deal with "Contra" insurgents. The Mi-25s performed ground attacks on the Contras and were also fast enough to intercept light aircraft being used by the insurgents. The U.S. Reagan Administration regarded introduction of the Mi-25s as a major escalation of tensions in Central America.

Two Mi-25s were shot down by Stingers fired by the Contras. A third Mi-25 was damaged while pursuing Contras near the Honduran border, when it was intercepted by Honduran F-86 Sabres and A-37 Dragonflies. A fourth was flown to Honduras by a defecting Sandinista pilot in December 1988.

=== Sri Lankan Civil War (1987–2009) ===
The Indian Peace Keeping Force (1987–90) in Sri Lanka used Mi-24s when an Indian Air Force detachment was deployed there in support of the Indian and Sri Lankan armed forces in their fight against various Tamil militant groups such as the Liberation Tigers of Tamil Eelam (LTTE). It is believed that Indian losses were considerably reduced by the heavy fire support from their Mi-24s. The Indians lost no Mi-24s in the operation, as the Tigers had no weapons capable of downing the gunship at the time.

Since 14 November 1995, the Mi-24 has been used by the Sri Lanka Air Force in the war against the LTTE liberation group and has proved highly effective at providing close air support for ground forces. The Sri Lanka Air Force operates a mix of Mi-24/-35P and Mi-24V/-35 versions attached to its No. 9 Attack Helicopter Squadron. They have recently been upgraded with modern Israeli FLIR and electronic warfare systems. Five were upgraded to intercept aircraft by adding radar, fully functional helmet mounted target tracking systems, and AAMs. More than five Mi-24s have been lost to LTTE MANPADS, and another two lost in attacks on air bases, with one heavily damaged but later returned to service.

=== Peruvian operations (1989–present) ===
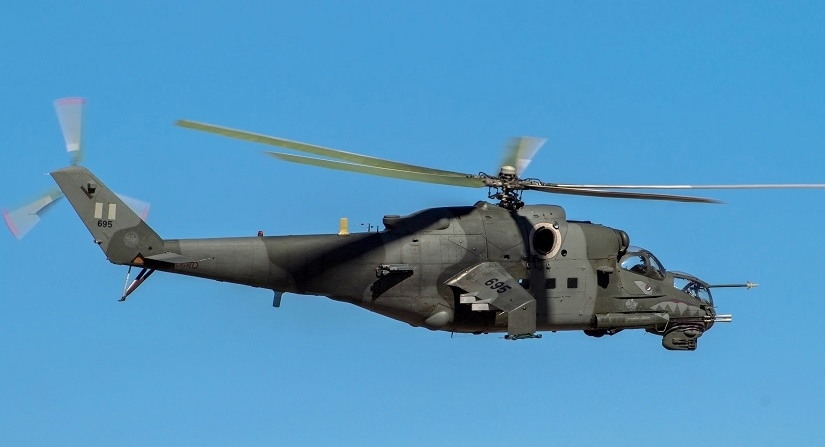
A Peruvian Mi-35P

The Peruvian Air Force received 12 Mi-25Ds and 2 Mi-25DU from the Soviets in 1983, 1984, and 1985 after ordering them in the aftermath of 1981 Paquisha conflict with Ecuador. Seven more second hand units (4 Mi-24D and 3 Mi-25D) were obtained from Nicaragua in 1992. These have been permanently based at the Vitor airbase near La Joya ever since, operated by the 2nd Air Group of the 211th Air Squadron. Their first deployment occurred in June 1989 during the war against Communist guerrillas in the Peruvian highlands, mainly against Shining Path. Despite the conflict continuing, it has decreased in scale and is now limited to the jungle areas of Valley of Rivers Apurímac, Ene and Mantaro (VRAEM).

Peru also employed Mi-25s against Ecuadorian forces during the short Cenepa conflict in early 1995. The only loss occurred on 7 February, when a FAP Mi-25 was downed after being hit in quick succession by at least two, probably three, 9K38 Igla shoulder-fired missiles during a low-altitude mission over the Cenepa valley. The three crewmen were killed.

By 2011 two Mi-35P were purchased from Russia to reinforce the 211th Air Squadron.

=== Persian Gulf War (1991) ===
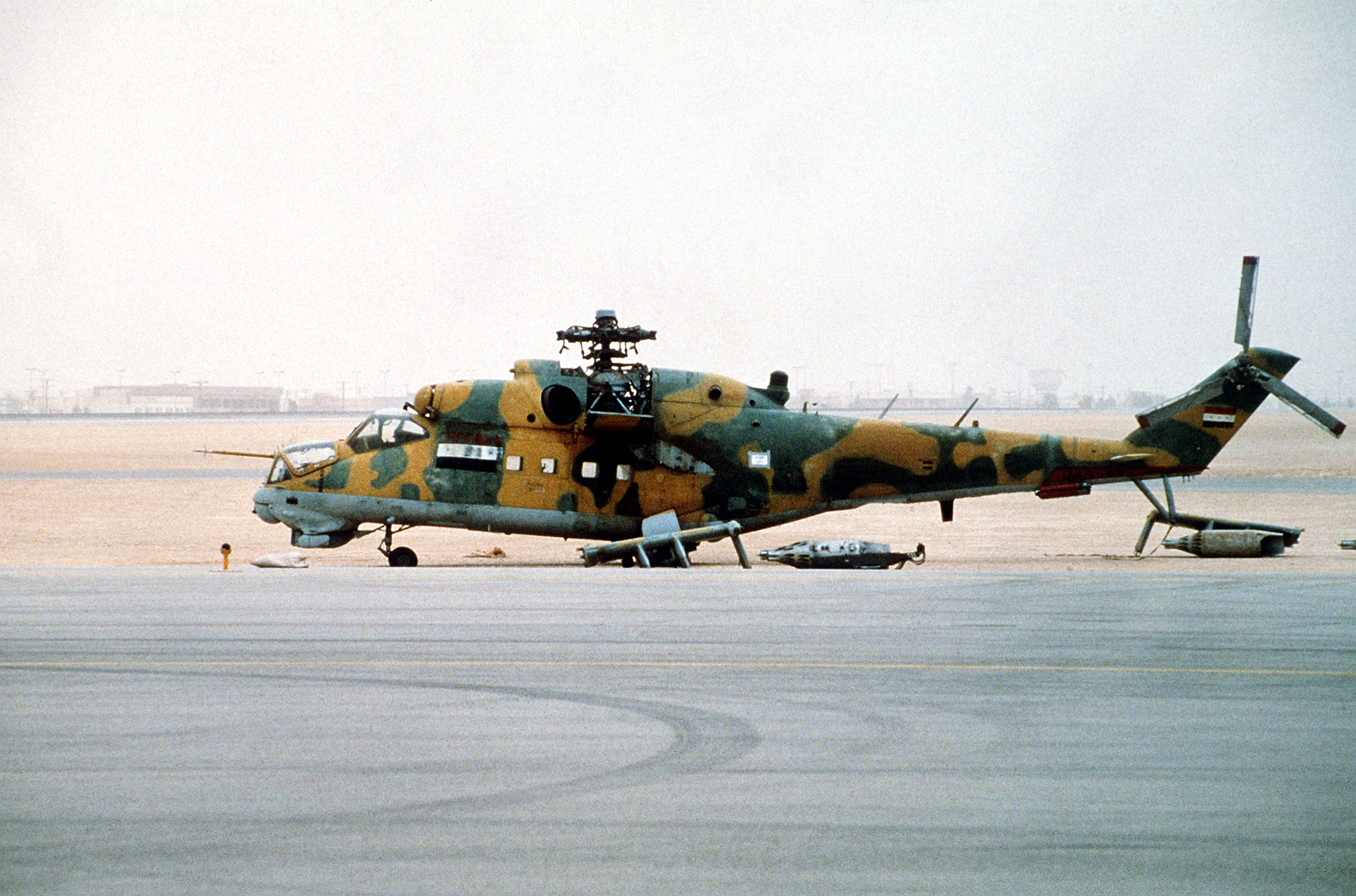
An Iraqi Mi-25 Hind-D, captured during the 1991 Persian Gulf War.

The Mi-24 was also heavily employed by the Iraqi Army during their invasion of Kuwait, although most were withdrawn by Saddam Hussein when it became apparent that they would be needed to help retain his grip on power in the aftermath of the war. In the ensuing 1991 uprisings in Iraq, these helicopters were used against dissidents as well as fleeing civilian refugees.

=== Sierra Leone Civil War (1991–2002) ===
Three Mi-24Vs owned by Sierra Leone and flown by South African military contractors, including Neall Ellis, were used against RUF rebels. In 1995, they helped drive the RUF from the capital, Freetown. Neall Ellis also piloted a Mi-24 during the British-led Operation Barras against West Side Boys. Guinea also used its Mi-24s against the RUF on both sides of the border and was alleged to have provided air support to the LURD insurgency in northern Liberia in 2001–03.

=== Croatian War of Independence (1990s) ===
Twelve Mi-24s were delivered to Croatia in 1993, and were used effectively in 1995 by the Croatian Army in Operation Storm against the Army of Krajina. The Mi-24 was used to strike deep into enemy territory and disrupt Krajina army communications. One Croatian Mi-24 crashed near the city of Drvar, Bosnia and Herzegovina due to strong winds. Both the pilot and the operator survived. The Mi-24s used by Croatia were obtained from Ukraine. One Mi-24 was modified to carry Mark 46 torpedoes. The helicopters were withdrawn from service in 2004.

=== First and Second Wars in Chechnya (1990s–2000s) ===
During the First and Second Chechen Wars, beginning in 1994 and 1999 respectively, Mi-24s were employed by the Russian armed forces.

In the first year of the Second Chechen War, 11 Mi-24s were lost by Russian forces, about half of which were lost as a result of enemy action.

=== Sudanese Civil War (1995–2005) ===
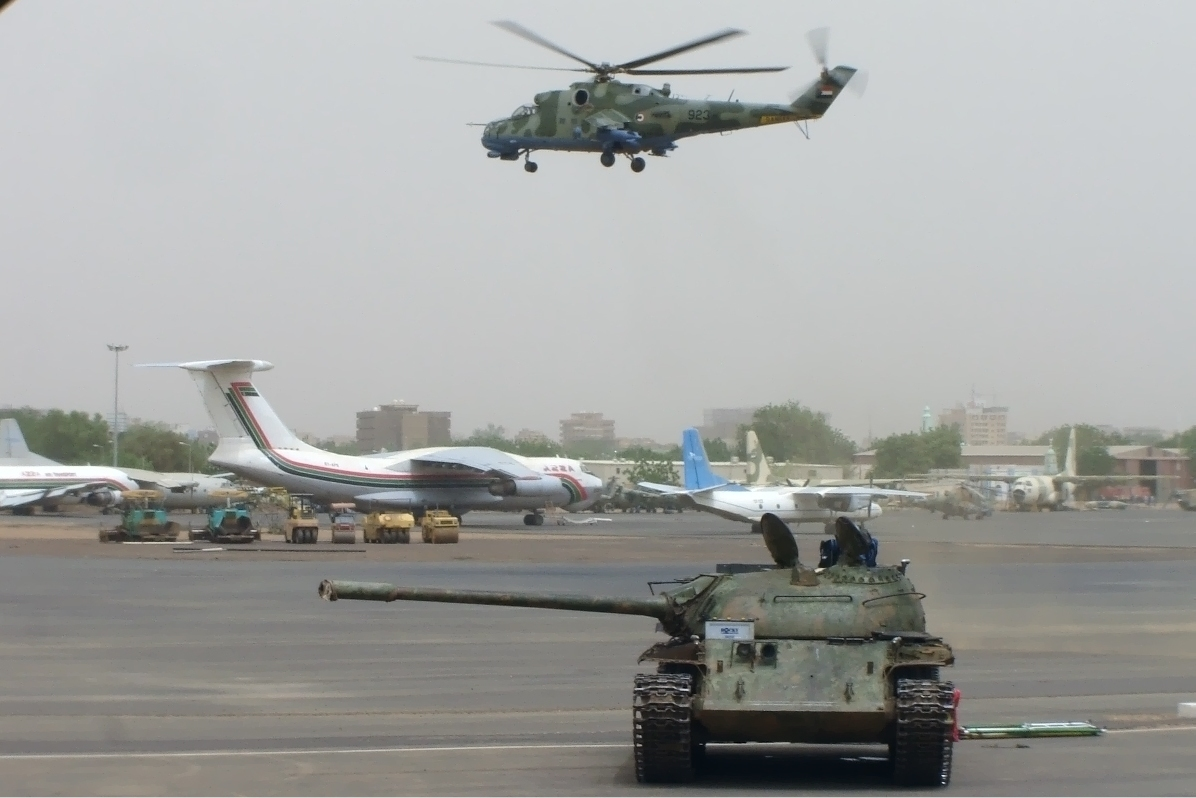
Sudanese Air Force Mil Mi-24 at Khartoum International Airport in 2006

In 1995, the Sudanese Air Force acquired six Mi-24s for use in Southern Sudan and the Nuba Mountains to engage the SPLA. At least two aircraft were lost in non-combat situations within the first year of operation. A further twelve were bought in 2001, and used extensively in the oil fields of Southern Sudan. Mi-24s were also deployed to Darfur in 2004–05.

=== First and Second Congo Wars (1996–2003) ===
Three Mi-24s were used by Mobutu's army and were later acquired by the new Air Force of the Democratic Republic of the Congo. These were supplied to Zaire in 1997 as part of a French-Serbian contract. At least one was flown by Serbian mercenaries. One hit a power line and crashed on 27 March 1997, killing the three crew and four passengers. Zimbabwean Mi-24s were also operated in coordination with the Congolese Army.

The United Nations peacekeeping mission employed Indian Air Force Mi-24/-35 helicopters to provide support during the Second Congo War. The IAF has been operating in the region since 2003.

=== Kosovo War (1998–1999) ===
Two second-hand Mi-24Vs procured from Ukraine earlier in the 1990s were used by the Yugoslav Special Operation Unit (JSO) against Kosovo Albanian rebels during the Kosovo War.

=== Insurgency in Macedonia (2001) ===
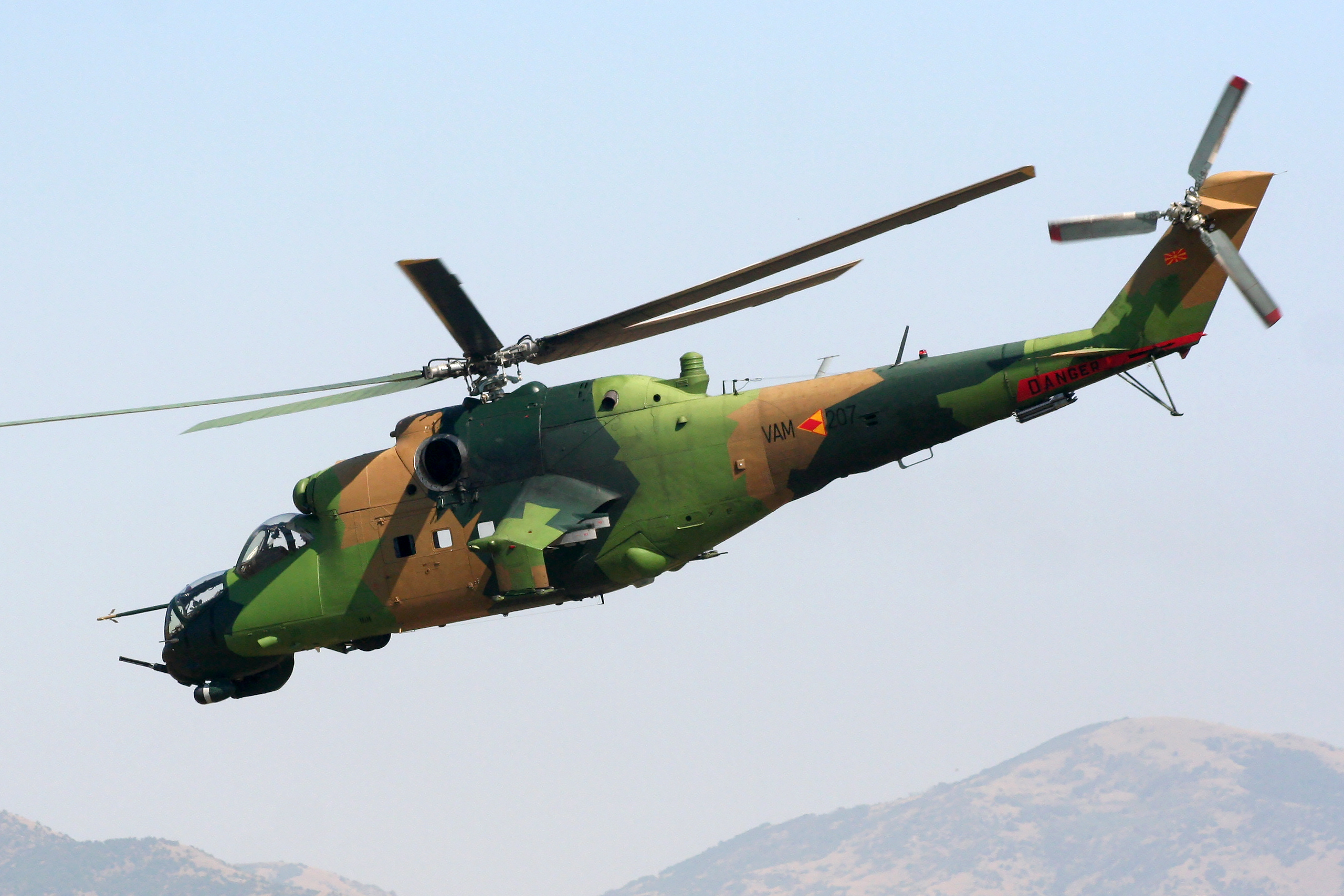
North Macedonia Mi-24V

The Macedonian military acquired used Ukrainian Mi-24Vs, which were then used frequently against Albanian insurgents during the 2001 insurgency in Macedonia (now North Macedonia). The main areas of action were in Tetovo, Radusha and Aracinovo.

=== Ivorian Civil War (2002–2004) ===
During the Ivorian Civil War, five Mil Mi-24s piloted by mercenaries were used in support of government forces. They were later destroyed by the French Army in retaliation for an air attack on a French base that killed nine soldiers.

=== War in Afghanistan (2001–2021) ===
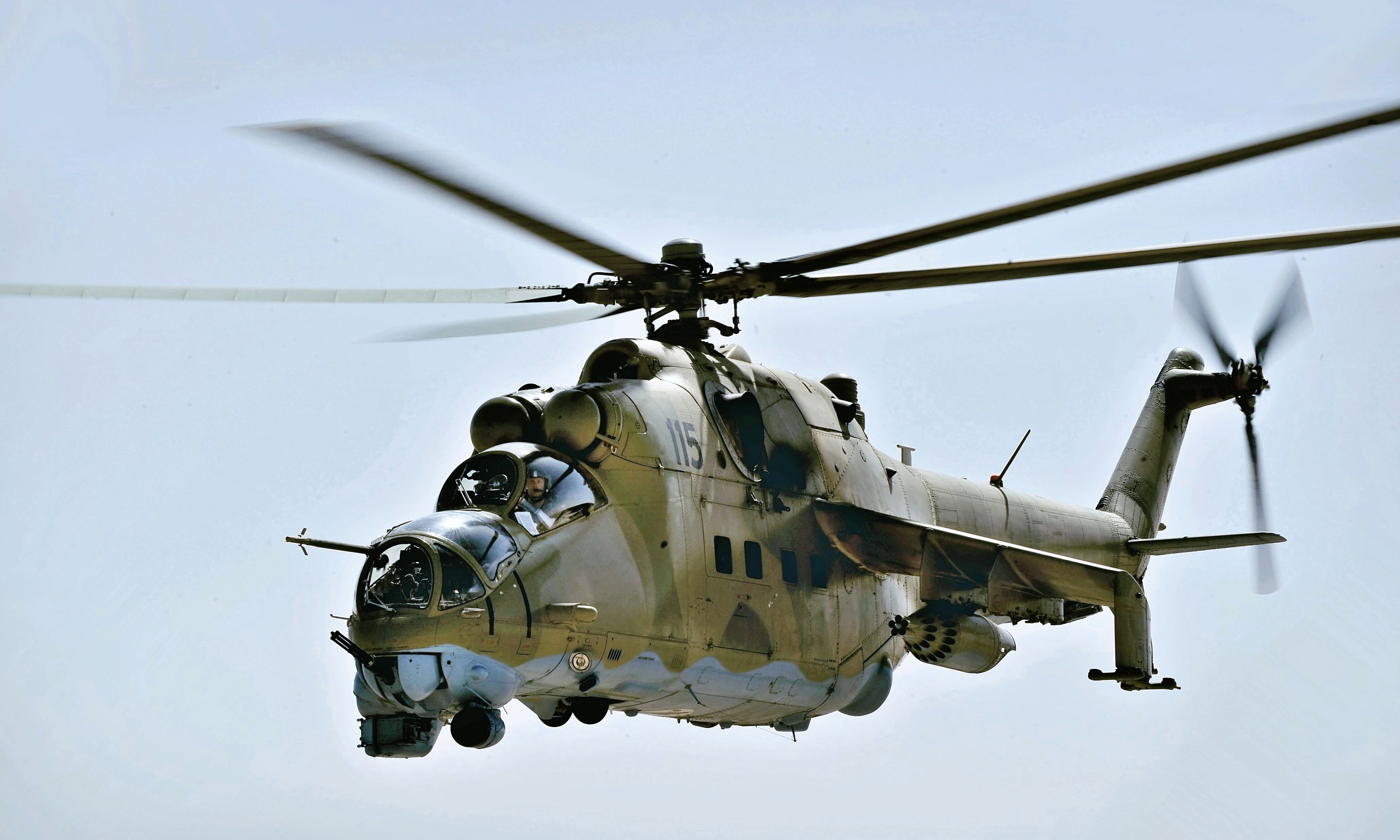
An Afghan Air Force Mi-35 over Kandahar, 2009

In 2008 and 2009, the Czech Republic donated six Mi-24s under the ANA Equipment Donation Programme. As a result, the Afghan National Army Air Corps (ANAAC) gained the ability to escort its own helicopters with heavily armed attack helicopters. ANAAC operates nine Mi-35s. Major Caleb Nimmo, a United States Air Force Pilot, was the first American to fly the Mi-35 Hind, or any Russian helicopter, in combat. On 13 September 2011, a Mi-35 of the Afghan Air Force was used to hold back an attack on ISAF and police buildings.

The Polish Helicopter Detachment contributed Mi-24s to the International Security Assistance Force (ISAF). The Polish pilots trained in Germany before deploying to Afghanistan and train with U.S. service personnel. On 26 January 2011, one Mi-24 caught on fire during take-off from its base in Ghazni. One American and four Polish soldiers evacuated unharmed.

India has also donated Mi-35s to Afghanistan. Four helicopters were to be supplied, with three already transferred in January 2016. The three Mi-35s made a big difference in the offensive against militants, according to General John Campbell, commander of US forces in Afghanistan.

=== Iraq War (2003–2011) ===
The Polish contingent in Iraq used six Mi-24Ds after December 2004. One of them crashed on 18 July 2006 in an air base in Al Diwaniyah. Polish Mi-24Ds used in Iraq were not returned to Poland due to their age, condition, low combat value of the Mi-24D variant, and high shipping costs; depending on their condition, they were transferred to the new Iraqi Army or scrapped.

=== War in Somalia (2006–2009) and Somali Civil War (2009–present) ===
The Ethiopian Air Force operated about three Mil Mi-35 and ten Mil Mi-24D helicopter gunships in the Ethiopian invasion of Somalia from 2006 to 2009. One was shot down on 30 March 2007 by Somali insurgents during the Battle of Mogadishu (March–April 2007).

In 2012, three Ugandan Air Force Mi-24s en route to Somalia to join counterinsurgency operations crashed in Kenya. In July 2025, an Mi-24 deployed to support AUSSOM and Somali National Army troops, was destroyed during a crash in Mogadishu.

=== 2008 Russo-Georgian War ===
Mil Mi-24s were used by both sides during the fighting in South Ossetia. During the war Georgian Air Force Mi-24s attacked their first targets on an early morning hour of 8 August, targeting the Ossetian presidential palace. The second target was a cement factory near Tskhinvali, where major enemy forces and ammunition were located. The last combat mission of the GAF Mi-24s was on 11 August, when a large Russian convoy, consisting of light trucks and BMP IFVs which were heading to the Georgian village of Avnevi was targeted by Mi-24s, completely destroying the convoy. The Georgian Air Force lost 2 Mi-24s on Senaki air base. They were destroyed by Russian troops on the ground. Both helicopters were in-operational. The Russian army heavily used Mi-24s in the conflict. Russian upgraded Mi-24PNs were credited for destroying 2 Georgian T-72SIM1 tanks, using guided missiles at night time, though some sources attribute those kills to Mil Mi-28. The Russian army did not lose any Mi-24s throughout the conflict, mainly because those helicopters were deployed to areas where Georgian air defence was not active, though some were damaged by small arms fire and at least one Mi-24 was lost due to technical reasons.

=== War in Chad (2008) ===
On returning to Abeche, one of the Chadian Mi-35s made a forced landing at the airport. It was claimed that it was shot down by rebels.

=== Libyan civil war (2011) ===
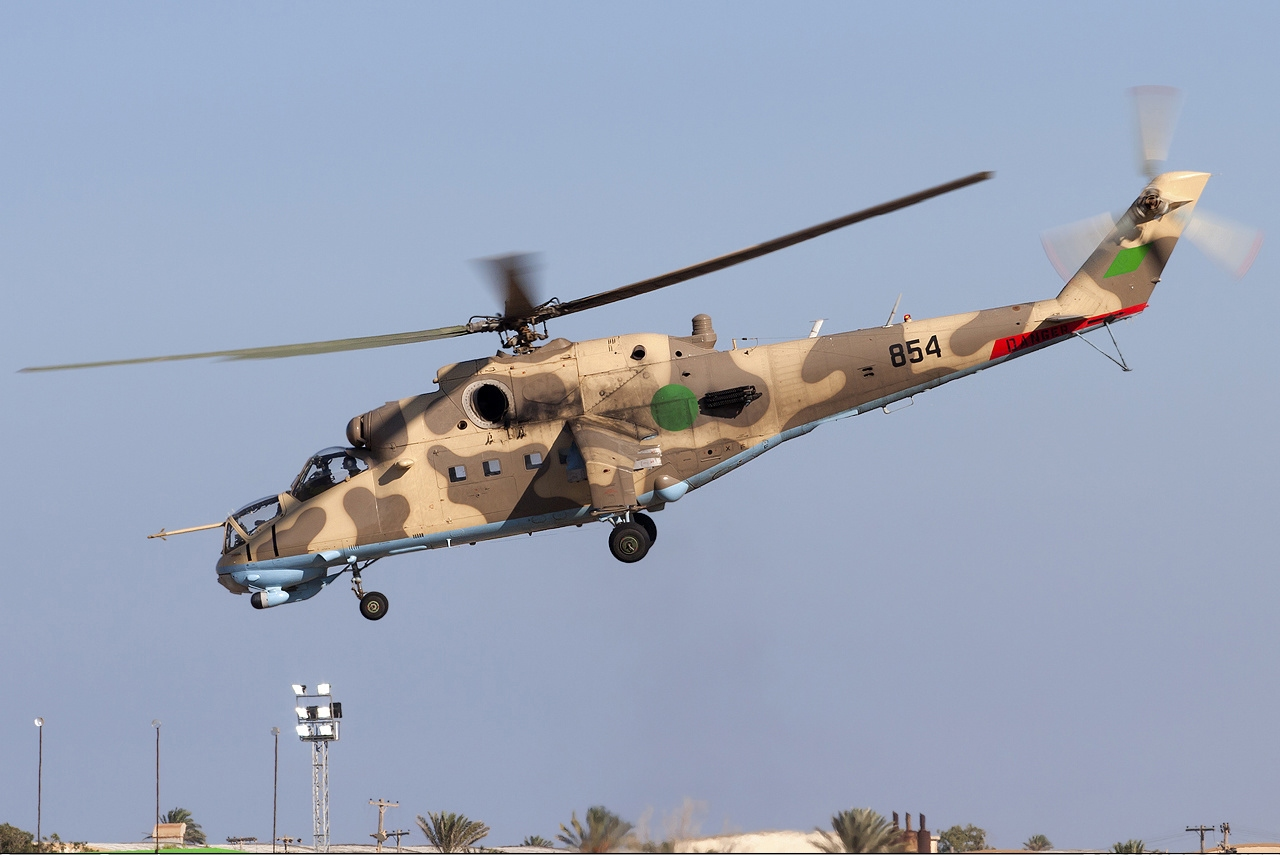
A Libyan Air Force Mil Mi-35

The Libyan Air Force Mi-24s were used by both sides to attack enemy positions during the 2011 Libyan civil war. A number were captured by the rebels, who formed the Free Libyan Air Force together with other captured air assets. During the battle for Benina airport, one Mi-35 (serial number 853), was destroyed on the ground on 23 February 2011. In the same action, serial number 854 was captured by the rebels together with an Mi-14 (serial number 1406). Two Mi-35s operating for the pro-Gaddafi Libyan Air Force were destroyed on the ground on 26 March 2011 by French aircraft enforcing the no-fly zone. One Free Libyan Air Force Mi-25D (serial number 854, captured at the beginning of the revolt) violated the no-fly-zone on 9 April 2011 to strike loyalist positions in Ajdabiya. It was shot down by Libyan ground forces during the action. The pilot, Captain Hussein Al-Warfali, died in the crash. The rebels claimed that a number of other Mi-25s were shot down.

=== 2010–2011 Ivorian crisis ===
Ukrainian army Mi-24P helicopters as part of the United Nations peacekeeping force fired four missiles at a pro-Gbagbo military camp in Ivory Coast's main city of Abidjan.

=== Syrian Civil War (2011–2024) ===
The Syrian Air Force has used Mi-24s during the ongoing Syrian Civil War, including in many of the country's major cities. Controversy has surrounded an alleged delivery of Mi-25s to the Syrian military, due to Turkey and other NATO members disallowing such arms shipments through their territory.

On 3 November 2016, a Russian Mi-35 made an emergency landing near Syria's Palmyra city, and was hit and destroyed, most likely by an unguided recoilless weapon after it touched down. The crew returned safely to the Khmeimim air base.

=== Second Kachin conflict (2011–present) ===
The Myanmar Air Force used the Mi-24 in the Kachin conflict against the Kachin Independence Army. Two Mi-35 helicopters were shot down by the Kachin Independence Army during the heavy fighting in the mountains of northern Burma in 2012 and early 2013.

On 3 May 2021, in the morning, a Myanmar Air Force Mi-35 was shot down by the Kachin Independence Army, hit by a MANPADS during air raids involving attack helicopters and fighter jets. A video emerged showing the helicopter being hit while flying over a village.

=== Post-U.S. Iraqi insurgency ===
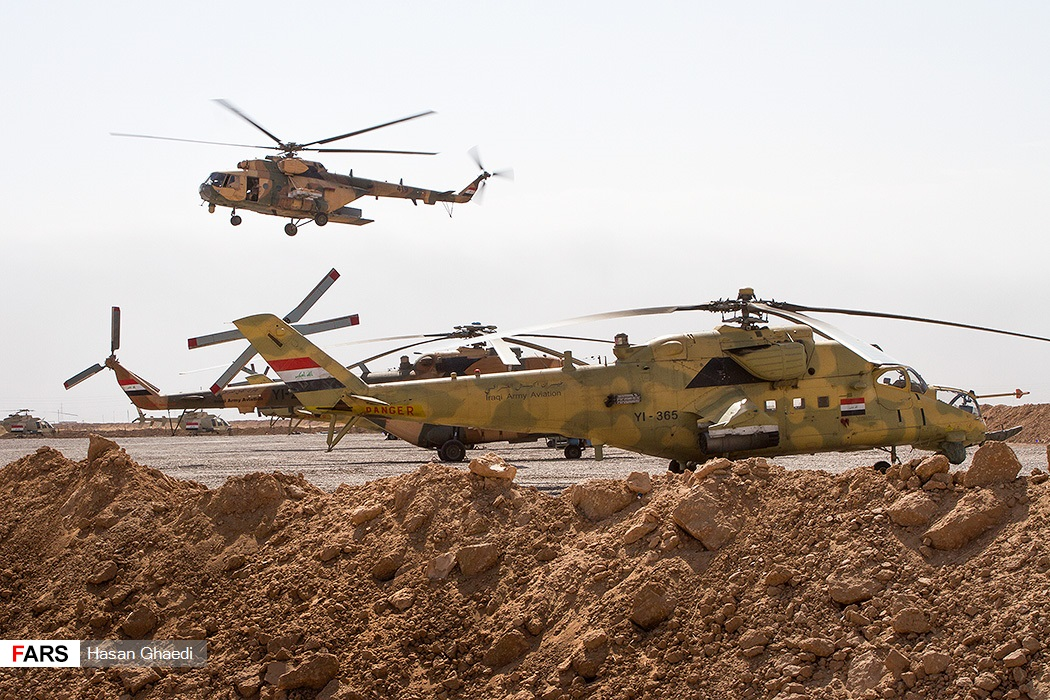
An Iraqi Mi-35M in 2017

Iraq ordered a total of 34 Mi-35Ms in 2013, as part of an arms deal with Russia that also included Mi-28 attack helicopters. The delivery of the first four was announced by then-Prime Minister Nuri al-Maliki in November 2013.

Their first deployment began in late December against camps of the al-Qaeda linked Islamic State of Iraq and the Levant (ISIL) and several Islamist militants in the al-Anbar province that had taken control of several areas of Fallujah and Ramadi. FLIR footage of the strikes has been released by the military.

On 3 October 2014, ISIL militants reportedly used a FN-6 shoulder-launched missile in Baiji to shoot down an Iraqi Army Mi-35M attack helicopter. Video footage released by ISIL militants shows at least another two Iraqi Mi-35s brought down by light antiaircraft artillery.

=== Balochistan Insurgency (2012–present) ===
In 2018, Pakistan received 4 Mi-35M Hind-E Gunships from Russia under the $153 million deal. They are now stationed at the Army Aviation Corps base at Quetta Cantonment. The gunships have since been used in several counter insurgency operations against various militant groups in the Balochistan province of Pakistan. In early 2022, a base in Nushki and a check-post in Panjgur belonging to the Frontier Corps Balochistan Paramilitary were attacked by BLA terrorists. The attack in Nushki was swiftly repulsed but the situation in Panjgaur was not good to which Mi-35 Hind and AH-1F Cobra gunships were called in for support. It provided much needed ground support and reconnaissance in the counter offensive which led to success.

=== Russian annexation of Crimea (2014) ===
During the annexation of Crimea by the Russian Federation, Russia deployed 13 Mi-24s to support their infantry as they advanced through the region. However these aircraft saw no combat during their deployment.

=== War in Donbas (2014-2022) ===
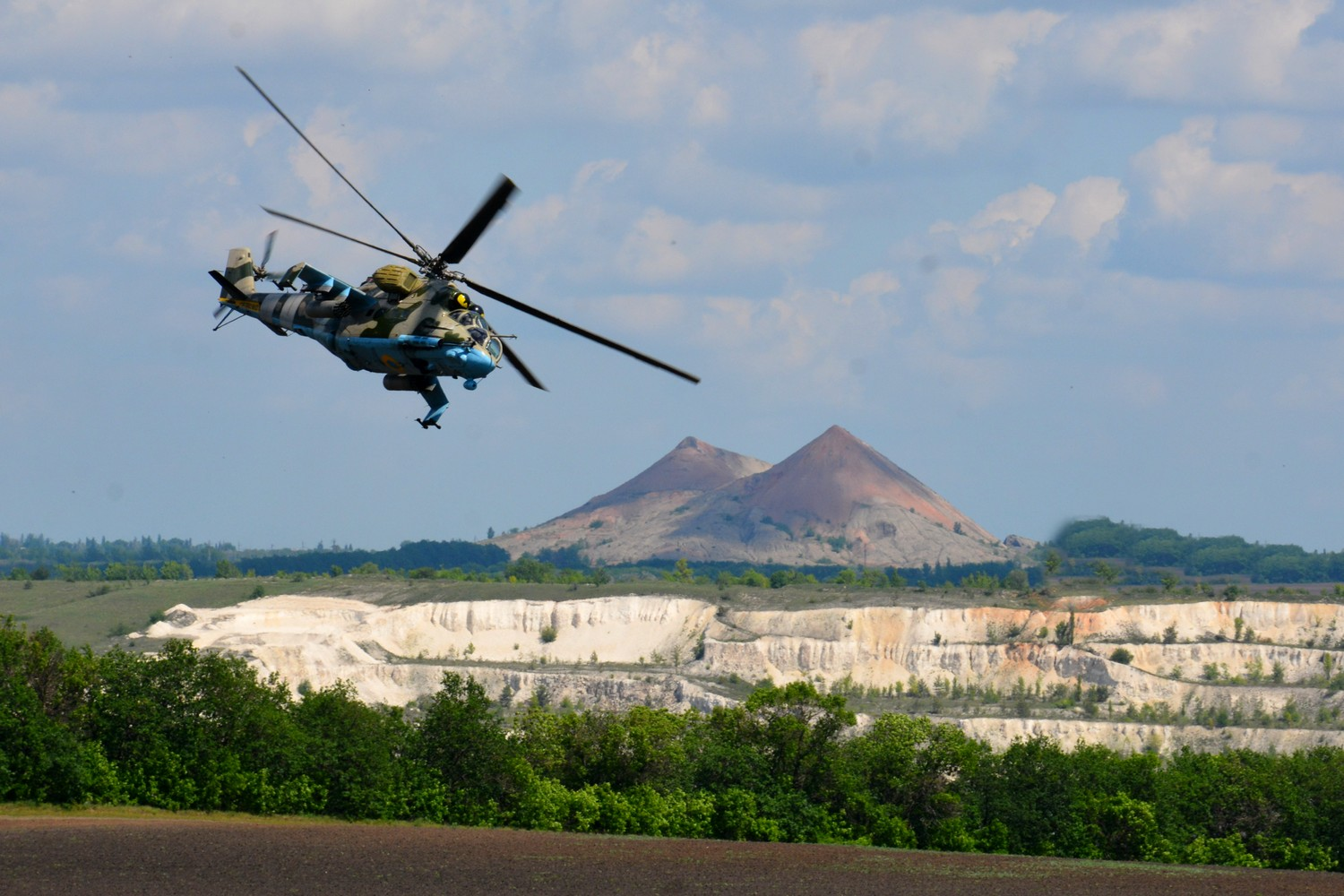
Ukrainian Mil Mi-24 during training at the time of the war in Donbas

During the Siege of Sloviansk, on 2 May 2014, two Ukrainian Mi-24s were shot down by pro-Russian insurgents. The Ukrainian armed forces claim that they were downed by MANPADS while on patrol close to Sloviansk. The Ukrainian government confirmed that both aircraft were shot down, along with an Mi-8 damaged by small arms fire. Initial reports mentioned two dead and others wounded; later, five crew members were confirmed dead and one taken prisoner until being released on 5 May.

On 5 May 2014, another Ukrainian Mi-24 was forced to make an emergency landing after being hit by machine gun fire while on patrol close to Sloviansk. The Ukrainian forces recovered the two pilots and destroyed the helicopter with a rocket strike by an Su-25 aircraft to prevent its capture by pro-Russian insurgents.

Ukrainian Su-25s, with MiG-29 fighters providing top cover, supported Mi-24s during the battle for Donetsk Airport.

On 13 October 2018, a Ukrainian Mi-24 shot down an Orlan-10 UAV using cannon fire near Lysychansk.

=== Chadian offensive against Boko Haram (2015) ===
Chadian Mi-24s were used during the 2015 West African offensive against Boko Haram.

=== Azerbaijan-Karabakh (2014–2016, 2020) ===
On 12 November 2014, Azerbaijani forces shot down an Armenian forces Mi-24 from a formation of two which were flying along the disputed border, close to the frontline between Azerbaijani and Armenian troops in the disputed Karabakh territory. The helicopter was hit by an Igla-S shoulder-launched missile fired by Azerbaijani soldiers while flying at low altitude and crashed, killing all three on board.

On 2 April 2016, during a clash between Azerbaijani and Armenian forces, an Azerbaijani Mi-24 helicopter was shot down by "Nagorno-Karabakh" forces. The downing was confirmed by the Azerbaijani defence ministry.

On 9 November 2020, during the Nagorno-Karabakh war a Russian Mi-24 was shot down by Azerbaijani forces with a MANPADS. The Azerbaijan Foreign Ministry stated that the downing was an accident. Two crew members were killed and one sustained moderate injuries. The Russian defence ministry confirmed the downing in a press release the same day.

=== Russian invasion of Ukraine (2022–present) ===
During the 2022 Russian invasion of Ukraine, both Ukraine and Russia have used Mi-24 helicopters. On 1 March 2022, Ukrainian forces shot down a Russian Mi-35M helicopter with MANPADS, in the Kyiv Reservoir (see also Battle of Kyiv). On 5 May 2022, the helicopter was retrieved by Ukrainian engineers in Vyshgorod. Two Russian Mi-35 were shot down by a MANPADS on 5 March 2022. On 6 March, one Mi-24P with registration number RF-94966 was shot down by Ukrainian MANPADS in Kyiv Oblast. On 8 March 2022 one Ukrainian Mil Mi-24 from the Ukrainian 16th Army Aviation Brigade was lost over Brovary, Kyiv. Pilots Col. Oleksandr Maryniak and Cptn. Ivan Bezzub were killed. On 17 March a Russian Mi-35M was reported destroyed by Ukrainian Ministry of Defence, unknown location. On 1 April 2022, two Ukrainian Mi-24s reportedly entered Russia and attacked an oil storage facility in Belgorod.

In May 2022, the Czech Republic donated Mi-24 helicopters to Ukraine. In July 2023, it was reported that Poland secretly donated at least a dozen Mi-24s to Ukraine. In late 2023, Russia tried to buy the deactivated Mi-35 from the Brazilian Air Force, but the Brazilian government denied the sale.

In early 2025, the Nigerian Air Force offered to sell its Mi-24 helicopters to Ukraine. Despite early interest, the offer was denied due to their poor condition.

As of 27 May 2025, claimed losses compiled by Oryx blog are listed as following: 4 Mi-24P, 4 Mi-24V/P/35M, 10 Mi-35M for the Russian side, and 2 Mi-24P and 7 Mi-24 of unknown variant for the Ukrainian side.

== Operators ==
Operators: Current Former

Afghanistan

- Afghan Air Force - 4 Mi-24s as of 2025

Algeria

- Algerian Air Force - 30 Mi-24 SuperHind MkIII as of 2024

Angola

- Angolan Air Force - 14 Mi-24 as of 2025

Armenia

- Armenian Air Force - 20 Mi-35 as of 2025, 5 of which are in service with the Nagorno-Karabakh Defence Army Air Force

Azerbaijan

- Azerbaijani Air Forces - 16 Mi-24s as of 2025

Belarus

- Belarus Air Force - 25 Mi-35s as of 2024

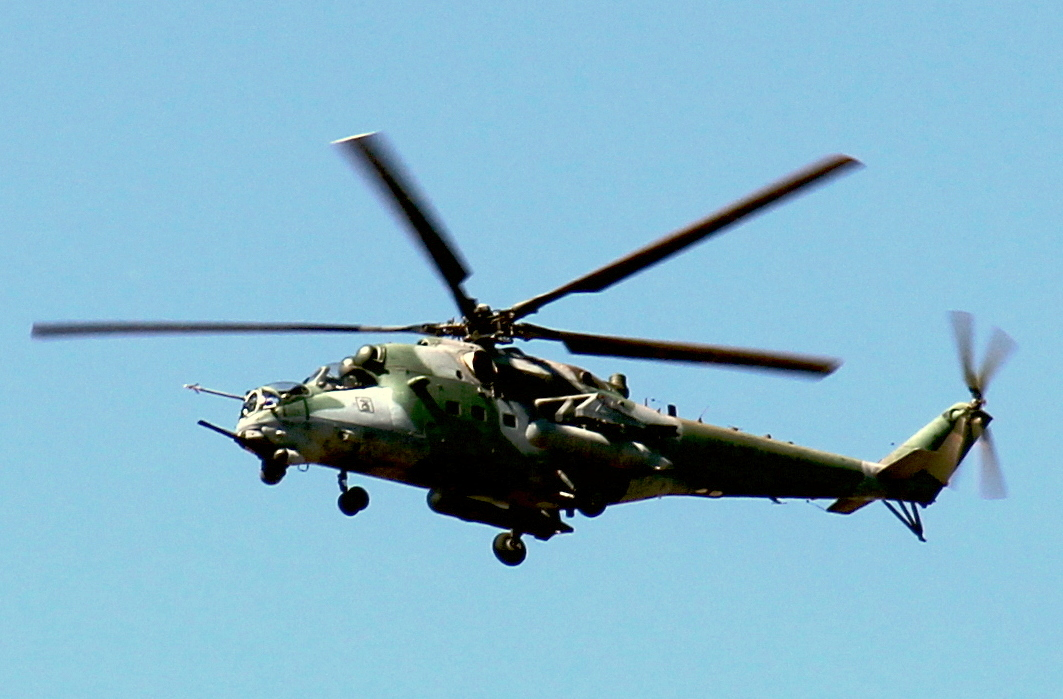
Brazilian Air Force Mi-35M

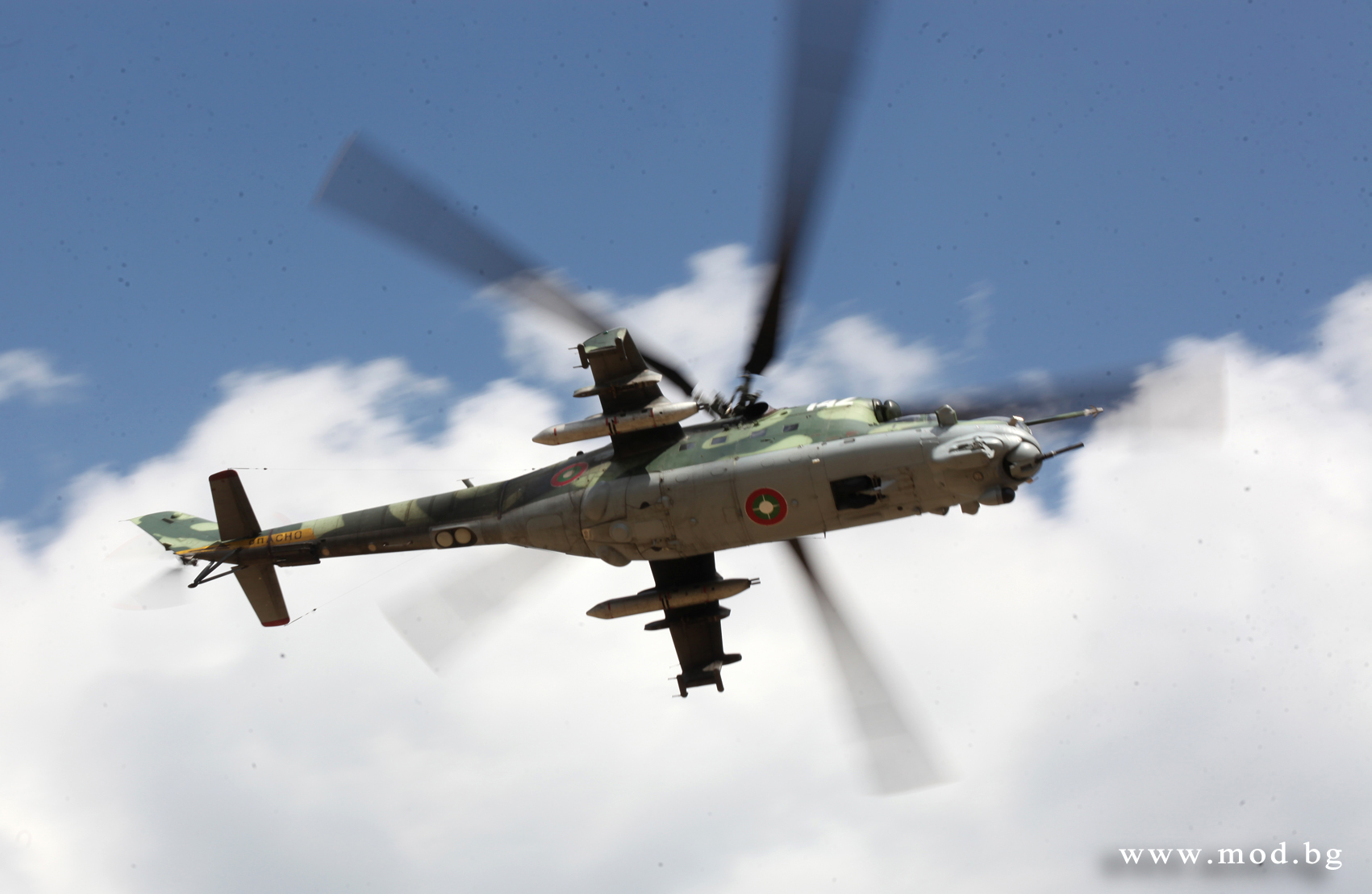
A Bulgarian Air Force Mi-24 in flight

Bulgaria

- Bulgarian Air Force - 4 Mi-24s as of 2025

Burkina Faso

- Burkina Faso Air Force - 2 Mi-24s as of 2023

Burundi

- National Defence Force (Burundi)- 2 Mi-35s as of 2012

Chad

- Chadian Air Force - 3 Mi-35 as of 2024

Congo, Republic of the

- Congolese Air Force - 1 Mi-35 as of 2024

Democratic Republic of the Congo

- Congolese Democratic Air Force - 8 Mi-35s as of 2024

Cuba

- Cuban Air Force - 4 Mi-35 as of 2024

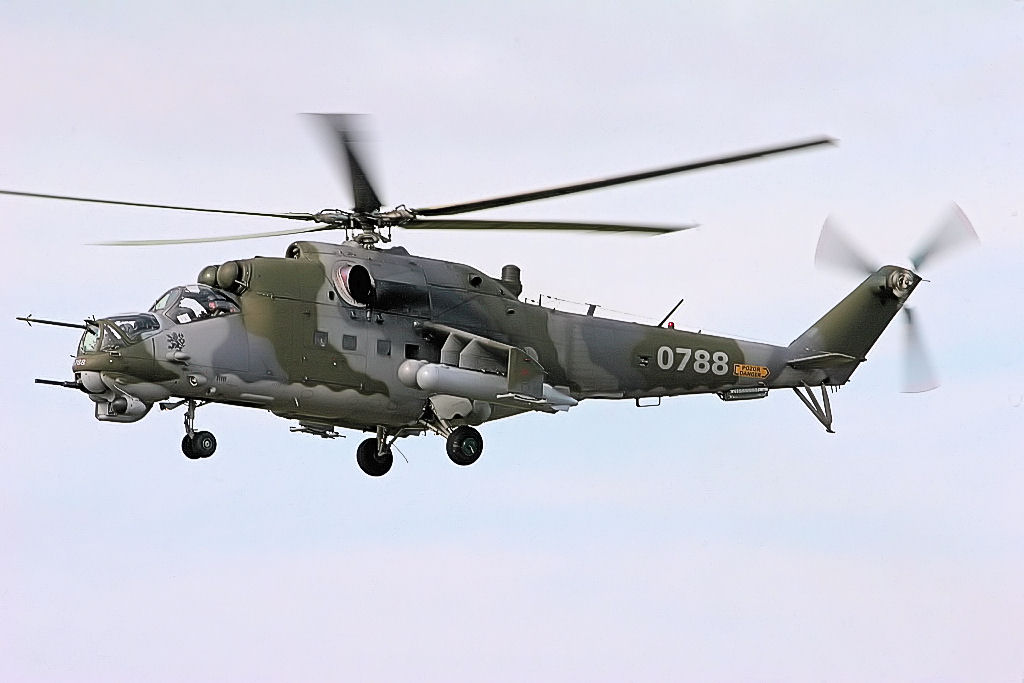
A Czech Air Force Mi-24

Djibouti

- Djibouti Air Force - 2 Mi-35 as of 2024

Egypt

- Egyptian Air Force - 8 Mi-24 as of 2025

Eritrea

- Eritrean Air Force - 6 Mi-35 as of 2024

Ethiopia

- Ethiopian Air Force - 6 Mi-35 as of 2024

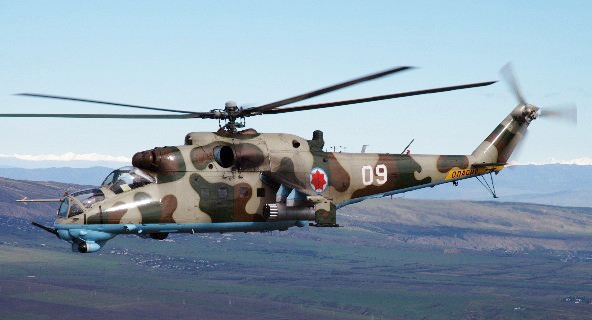
Georgian Air Force Mi-24

Georgia

- Georgian Air Force - 9 Mi-24 as of 2024

Guinea

- Guinean Air Force - 3 Mi-25 as of 2024

India

- Indian Air Force - 15 Mi-25/35 as of 2023

Indonesia

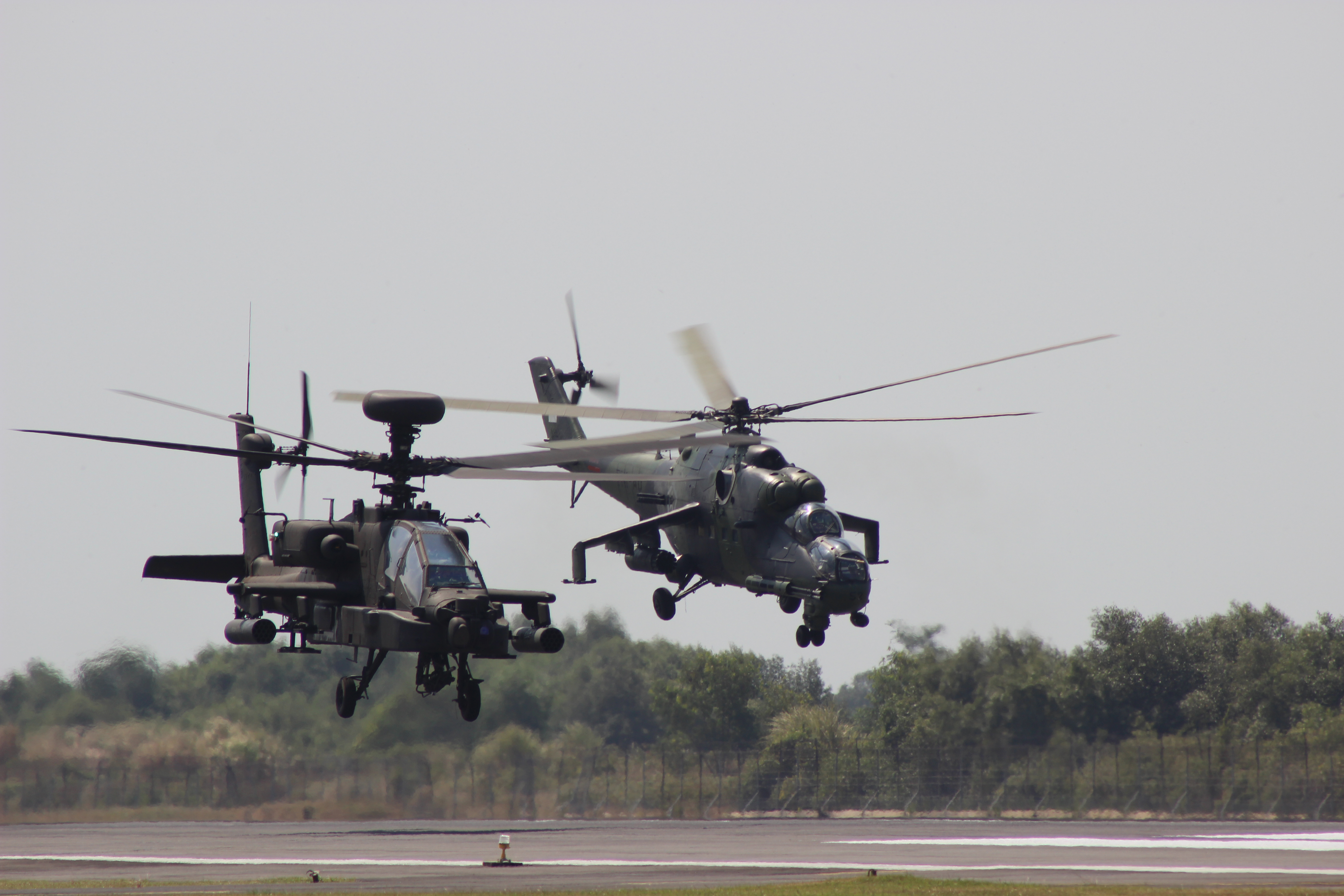
A U.S. Army AH-64 Apache and a Mi-35P from Indonesian Army

- Indonesian Army - 7 Mi-35 as of 2025. Received two Mi-35M in September 2026.

Iraq

- Iraqi Army Aviation - 22 Mi-35 as of 2025

Kazakhstan

- Military of Kazakhstan - 12 as of 2025, with 4 on order

Kyrgyzstan

- Kyrgyz Air Force - 2 Mi-24V as of 2025

Libya

- Libyan Air Force 7 Mi-24 as of 2025

Mali

- Air Force of Mali - 8 as of 2025

Mozambique

- Mozambique Air Force - 2 Mi-25 as of 2025

Myanmar

- Myanmar Air Force - 9 Mi-24 as of 2025

Namibia

- Namibian Air Force - 2 Mi-35 as of 2023

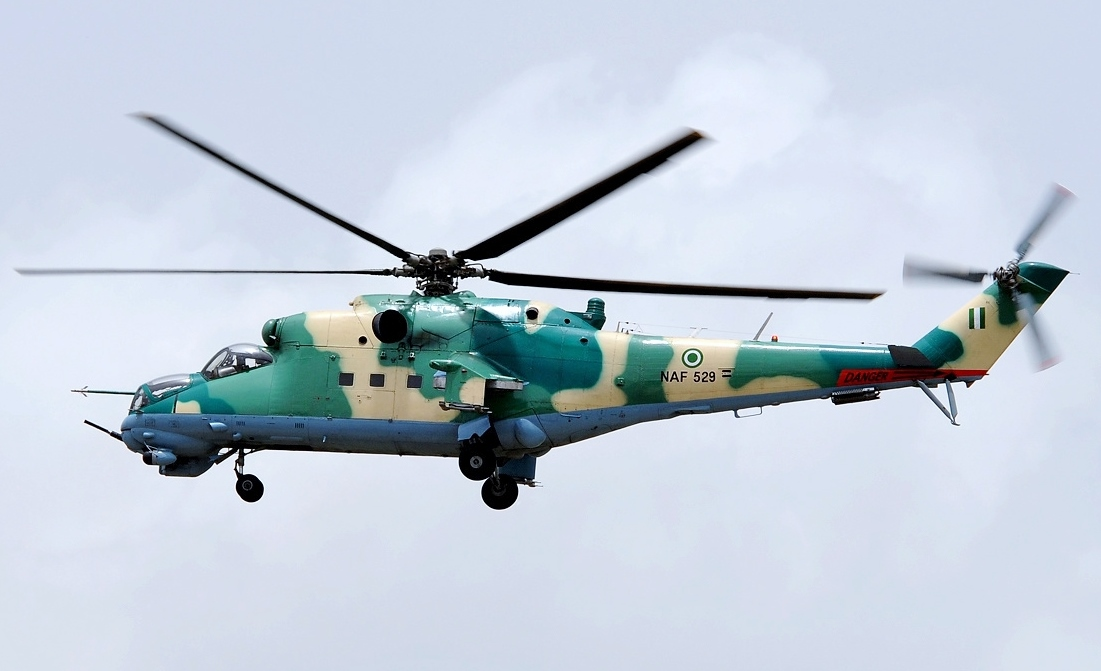
Nigerian Air Force Mil Mi-24V

Niger

- Air Force of Niger - 1 Mi-35 as of 2024 Received 2 Mi-24 SuperHind MkIII from Algeria in 2026

Nigeria

- Nigerian Air Force - 15 as of 2025, with 18 Mi-35 on order

Pakistan

- Pakistan Army - 4 as of 2025

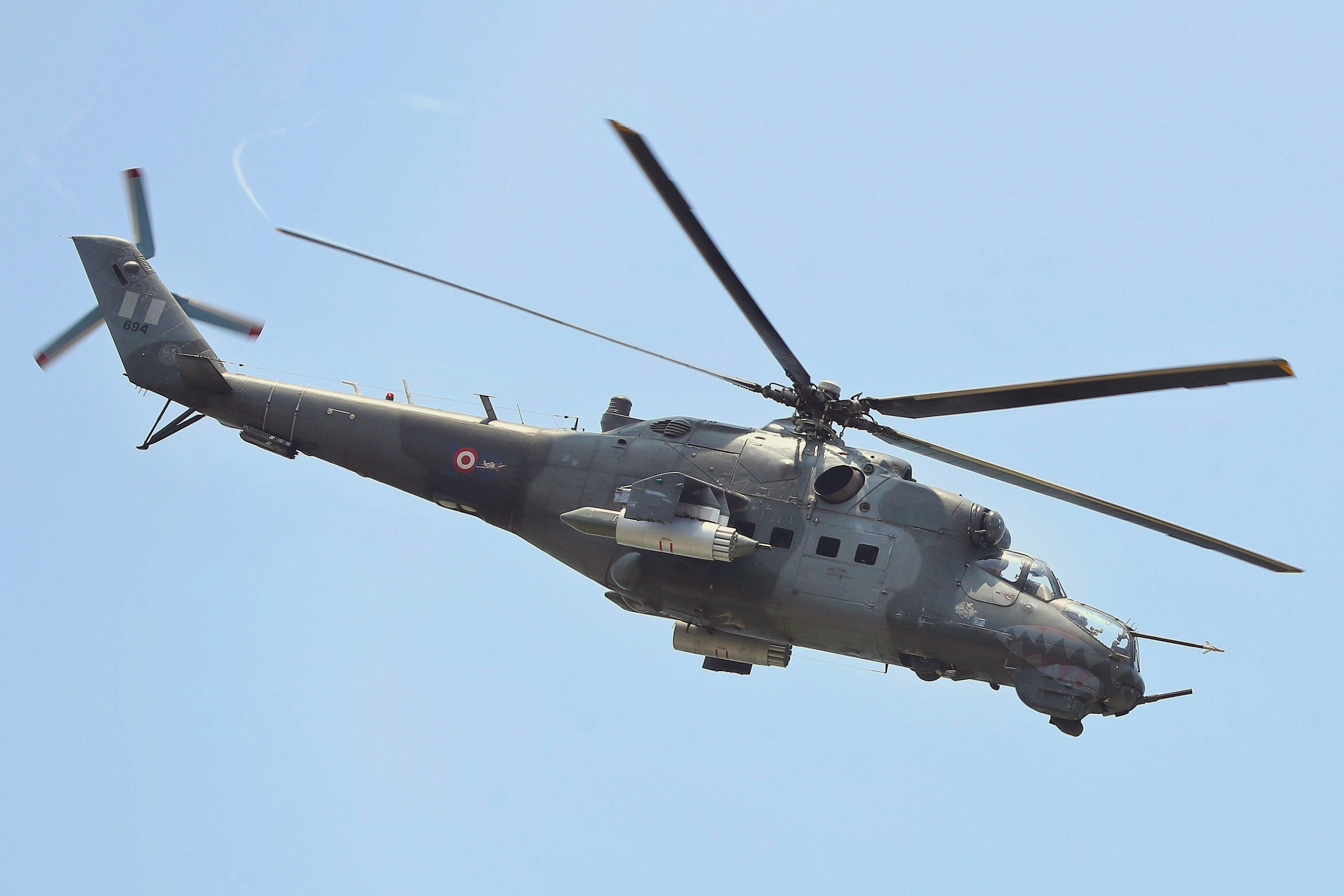
Peruvian Air Force Mi-25D

Peru

- Peruvian Air Force - 16 Mi-35 as of 2024

Poland

- Polish Land Forces - 16 Mi-24D/V as of 2025

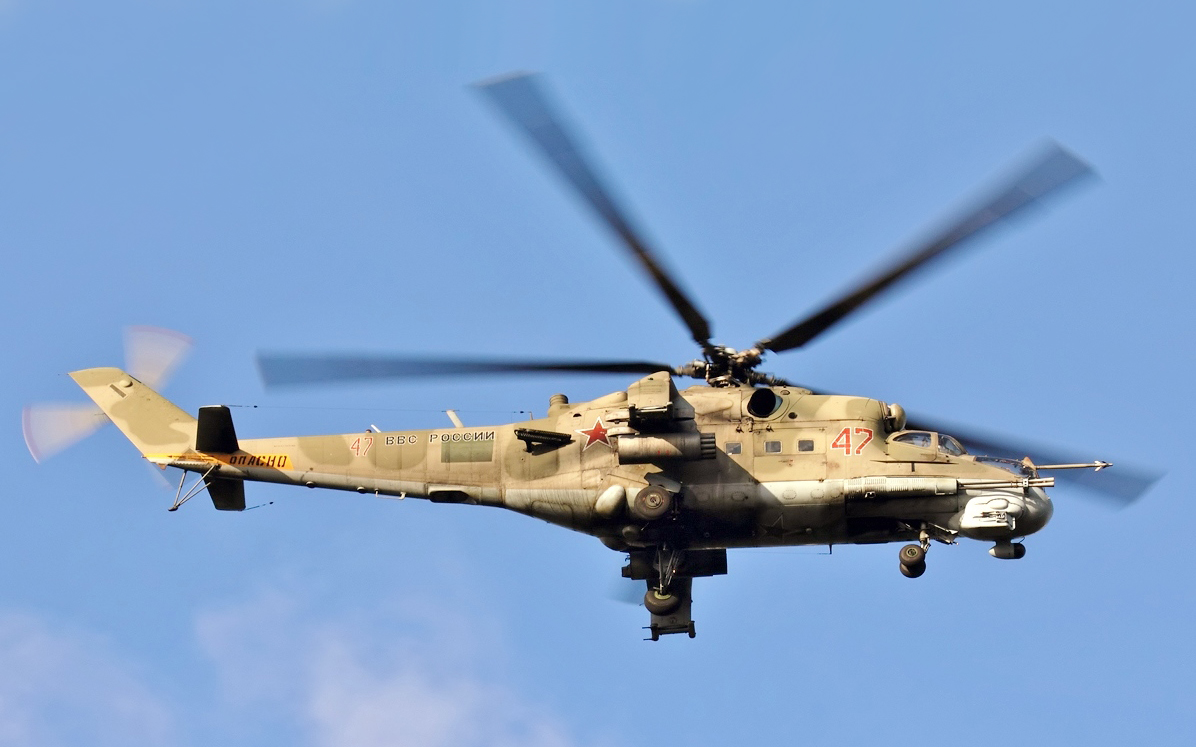
A Russian Air Force Mil Mi-35P

Russia

- Russian Aerospace Forces - 96 Mi-24D/V/P, 56 Mi-35P
- Russian Naval Aviation - 8 Mi-24P
- Border Service of Russia

Rwanda

- Rwandan Air Force - 5 Mi-35 as of 2024

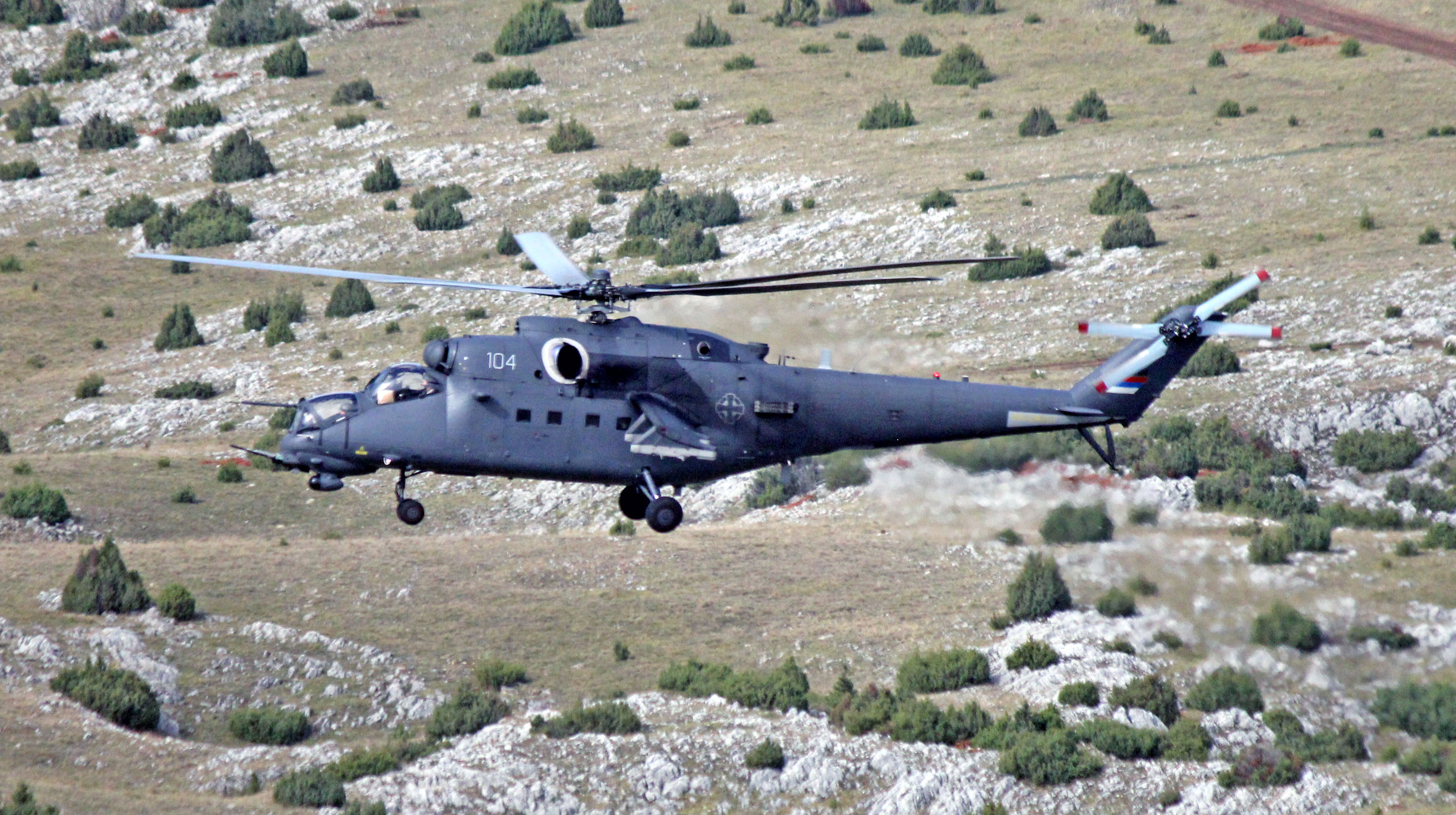
Serbian Mil Mi-35M during Sadejstvo 2020 military exercise

Serbia

- Serbian Air Force 4 Mi-35M, 11 Mi-35P

Senegal

- Senegalese Air Force - 3 Mi-35 as of 2023

Sri Lanka

- Sri Lanka Air Force - 9 Mi-35V as of 2023

Sudan

- Sudanese Air Force - 35 Mi-35 as of 2023

Tajikistan

- Tajik Air Force - 6 Mi-25 as of 2022

Turkmenistan

- Turkmen Air Force 10 Mi-24 as of 2025

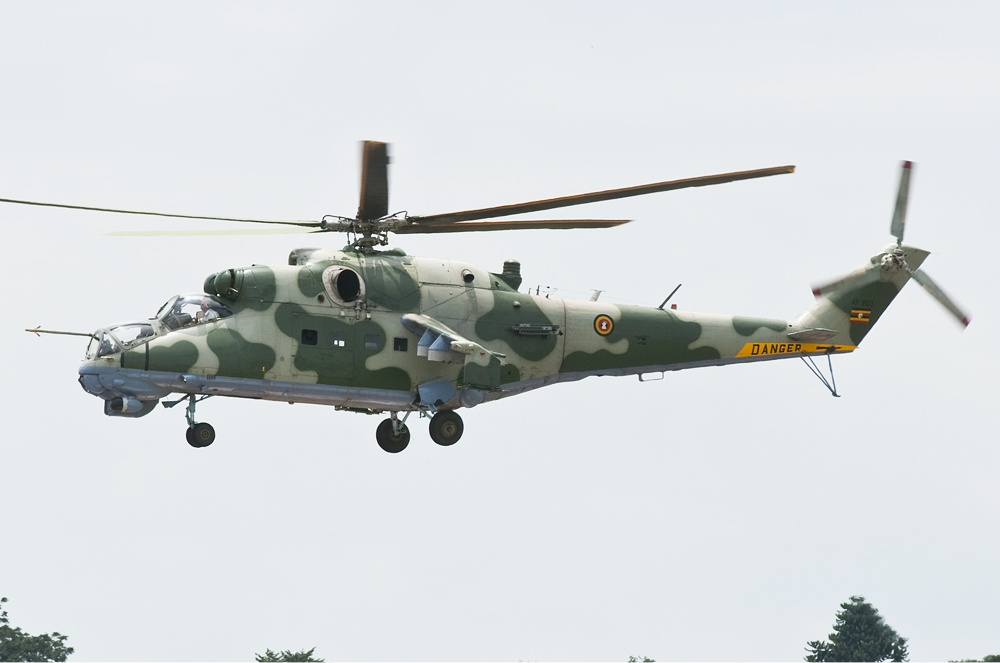
Uganda People's Defence Force Air Wing Mil Mi-24V

Uganda

- Ugandan Air Force - 6 Mi-35 as of 2024

Ukraine

- Ukrainian Ground Forces - 39 Mi-24 as of 2025

United States

- United States Air Force - (used for aggressor training)

Uzbekistan

- Uzbekistan Air and Air Defence Forces - 33 Mi-35

Venezuela

- Army of Venezuela - 9 Mi-35

Yemen

- Yemen Air Force - 14 Mi-35 as of 2024

Zimbabwe

- Air Force of Zimbabwe - 6 Mi-35 as of 2024

=== Former operators ===
Armenia

- Artsakh Defence Army

Brazil

- Brazilian Air Force

Croatia

- Croatian Air Force

Cyprus

- Cypriot National Guard – 11 helicopters sold to Serbia in November 2023

Czech Republic

- Czech Air Force – Retired and transferred to Ukraine in August 2023.

Czechoslovakia

- Czechoslovak Air Force

Equatorial Guinea

- Armed Forces of Equatorial Guinea

East Germany

- East German Air Force – transferred to Germany on reunification

Germany

- German Army – inherited from East Germany in 1990, retired 1993.

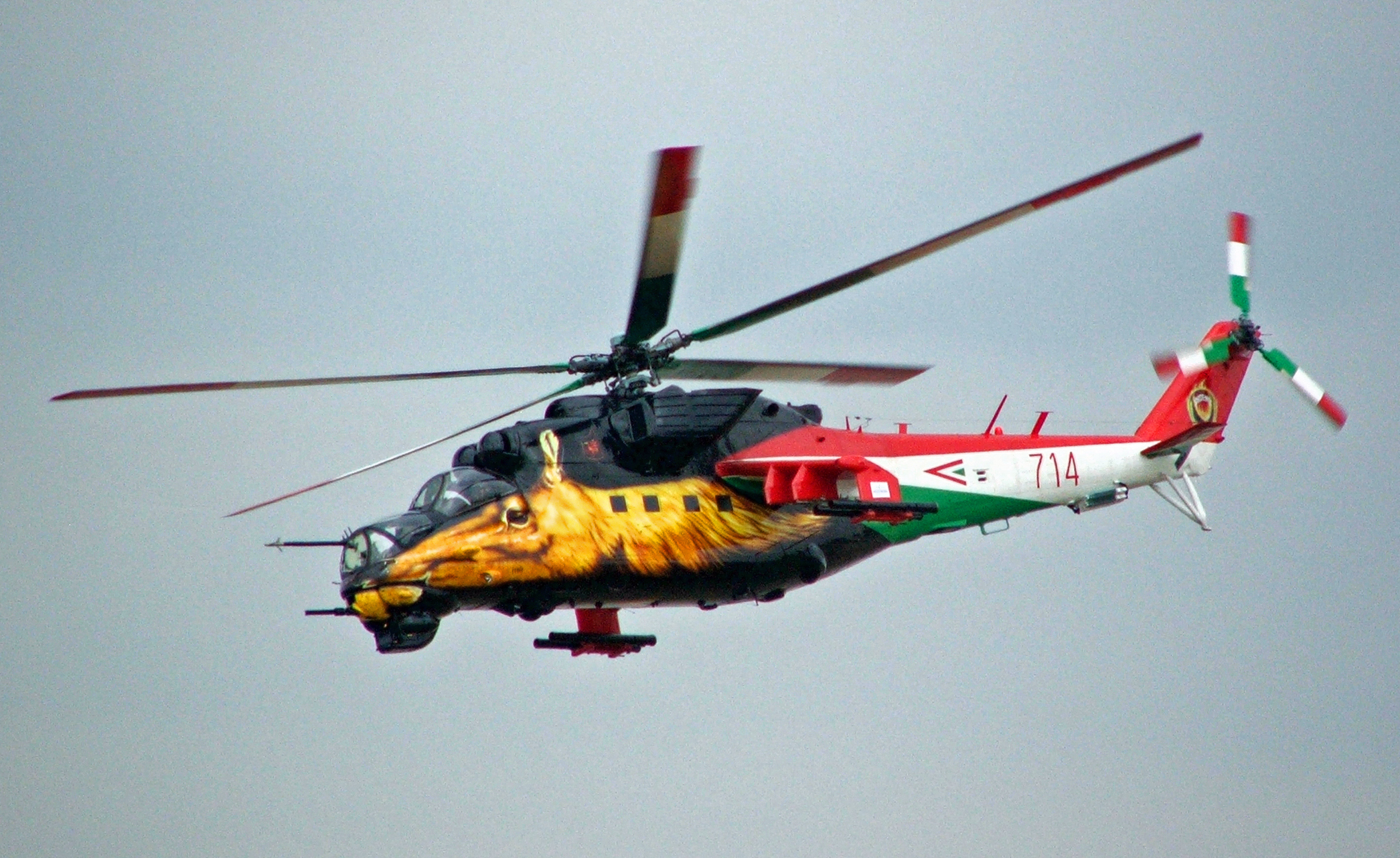
Hungarian Mi-24

Hungary

- Hungarian Air Force – 6 Mi-24V and 2 Mi-24P as of 2025. Retired in 2026.

Kampuchea

- Kampuchean People's Revolutionary Air Force

Mongolia

- Mongolian Air Force - Retired in 2024.

Nicaragua

- Fuerza Aérea Sandinista

North Macedonia

- Air Force of North Macedonia - donated to Ukraine in 2023

Slovakia

- Slovak Air Force

South Yemen

- People's Democratic Republic of Yemen Air Force

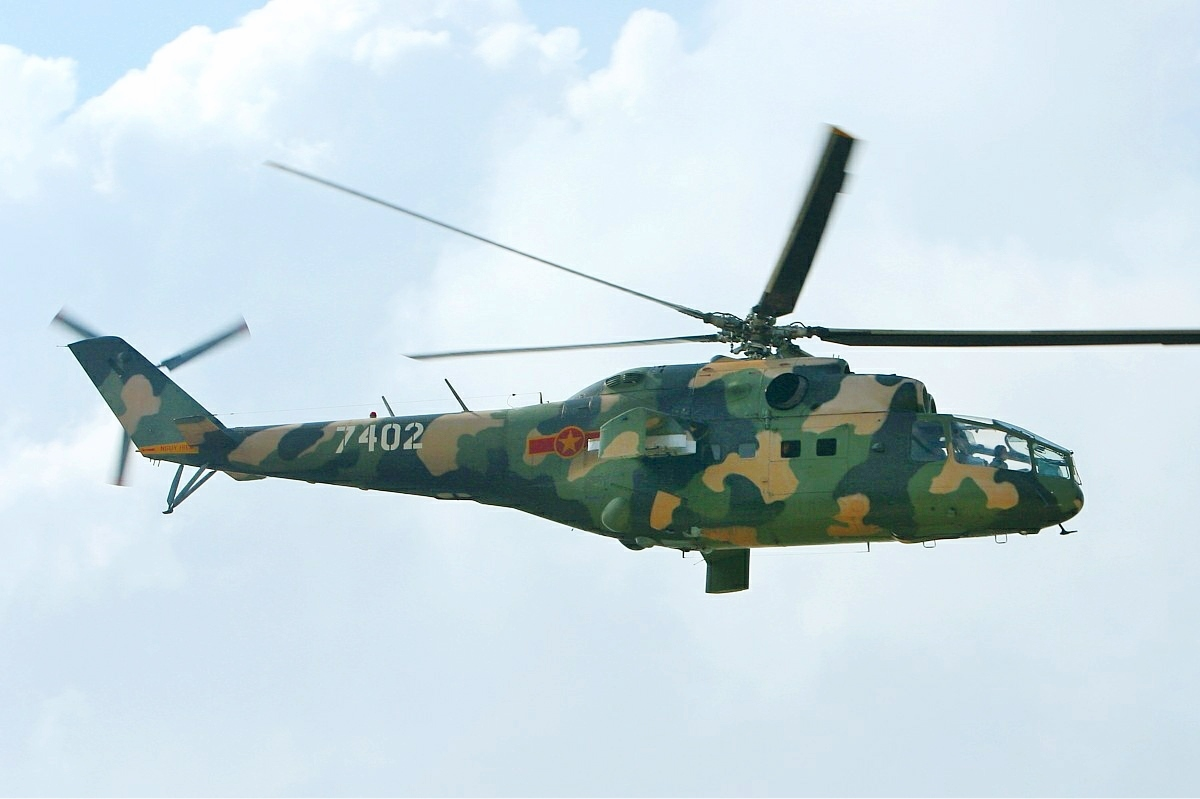
Vietnam People's Air Force Mi-24A

Soviet Union

- Soviet Air Force – transferred to successor states

Syria

- Syrian Arab Air Force - 27 Mi-25 as of 2023, but none reported in late 2025.

Yugoslavia

- Special Operations Unit

Transnistria

- Transnistria Air Force

Vietnam

- Vietnam People's Air Force

=== Possible operators ===
North Korea

- Korean People's Army Air and Anti-Air Force - possibly 20 Mi-35s as of 2024 May have none with claims traceable to an error by the Congressional Research Service.

== Aircraft on display ==
Mi-24 helicopters can be seen in the following museums:

Russia	Central Air Force Museum, Monino – Mi-24A, Mi-25
Belgium	Royal Museum of the Armed Forces and Military History, Brussel – Mi-24
Brazil	Museu Aeroespacial, Rio de Janeiro – Mi-35M
Bulgaria	Plovdiv Airport, Aviation Museum – Mi-24 National Museum of Military History, Bulgaria – Mi-24 d/b
Czech Republic	Prague Aviation Museum, Kbely – Mi-24D tactical number 0220
China	Chinese Aviation Museum, Beijing – Mi-24
Denmark	Panzermuseum East, Slagelse – East-German Mi-24P Hind-F from 1989 (construction nr.: 340339). Assigned NVA s/n 464, later German Army s/n 96+49.
Ethiopia	Martyrs Memorial Monument, Bahir Dar - Mi-24A
Germany	Luftwaffenmuseum der Bundeswehr, Berlin – Mi-24D, Mi-24P; Technik Museum Speyer
Hungary	Museum of Hungarian Aviation, Szolnok; Kertészet, Szajol – Mi-24D tactical number 577
Iran	Sa'ad Abad Museum in Tehran
Latvia	Riga Aviation Museum, Riga – Mi-24A tactical number 20
Nicaragua	Airforce Base Augusto C. Sandino International Airport, Managua, Mi-25 tactical number 361
Pakistan	Army Museum Lahore
Poland	Polish Army Museum, Warsaw – Mi-24D tactical number 013; Polish Air Force Museum, Dęblin – Mi-24D tactical number 016; Polish Aviation Museum, Kraków – Mi-24D
South Africa	South African Air Force Museum, Swartkops Air Force Base – One Mi-24A of the Algerian Air Force on display.
Slovakia	Military History Museum, Piešťany – Mi-24D tactical number 0100
Sri Lanka	Sri Lanka Air Force Museum, Ratmalana; SLAF Hingurakgoda; Defence Headquarters Complex, Akuregoda, Sri Jayawardenapura Kotte
Ukraine	Museum of the Great Patriotic War, Kyiv – Mi-24B; Ukraine State Aviation Museum, Kyiv – Mi-24A, Mi-24D, Mi-24P, Mi-24V
United Kingdom	The Helicopter Museum, Weston-super-Mare, Somerset – Mi-24D "96+26".; Midland Air Museum, Coventry Airport – Mi-24D "Red 6" on loan from BAE SYSTEMS.
United States	Southern Museum of Flight, Birmingham, Alabama; Pima Air and Space Museum, Tucson, Arizona; Russell Military Museum, Zion, Illinois – Mi-24D "110"; Threat Training Facility, Nellis Air Force Base, North Las Vegas, Nevada - Ex-Iraqi Air Force Mi-25 Hind-D sn3140
Vietnam	Vietnam People's Air Force Museum, Hanoi – Mi-24A; Vietnam People's Air Force Museum, Ho Chi Minh City – Mi-24A

== Specifications (Mi-24) ==
Orthographic projection of the Mil Mi-24.

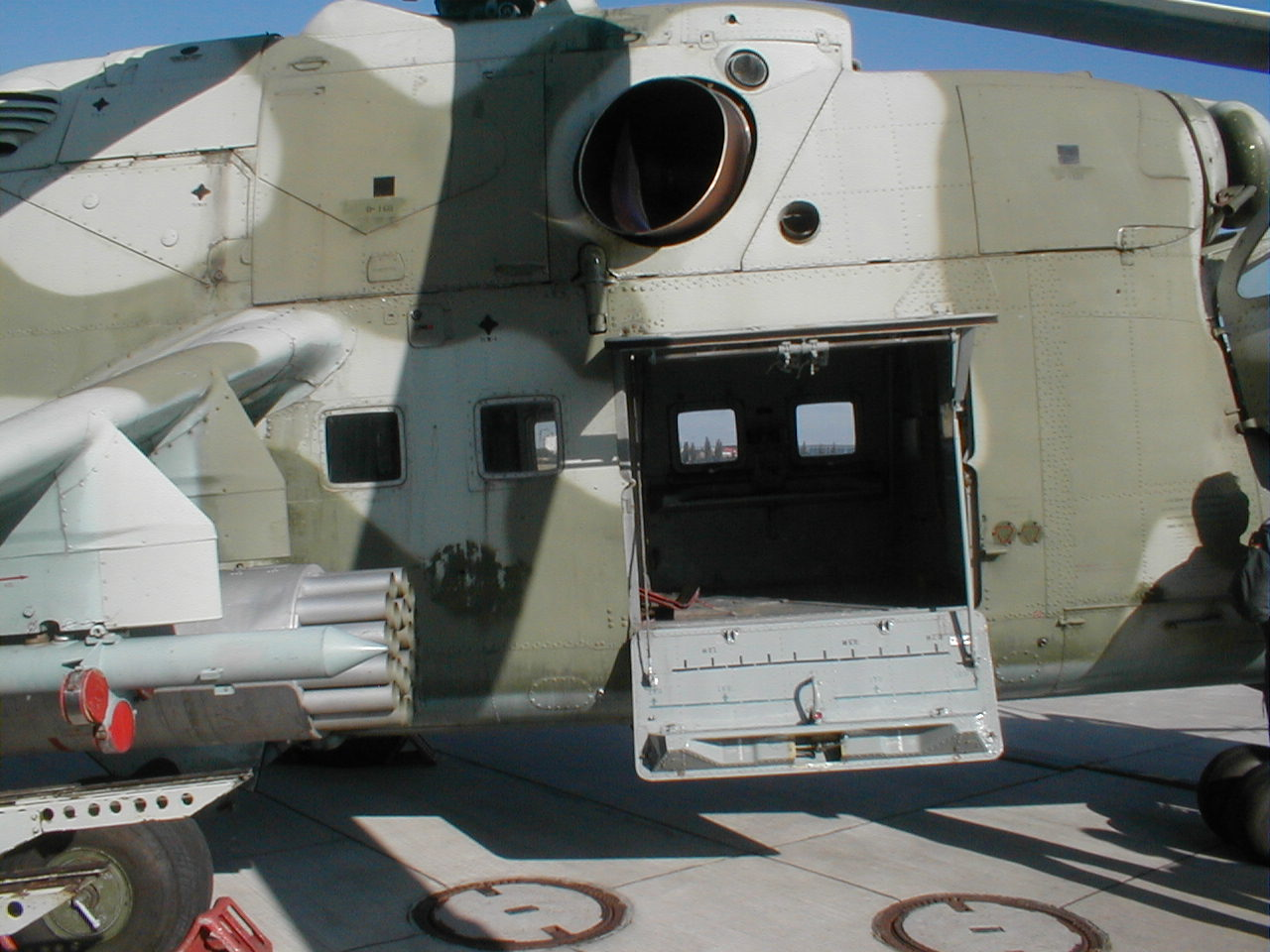
Cabin door to the rear troop-utility compartment

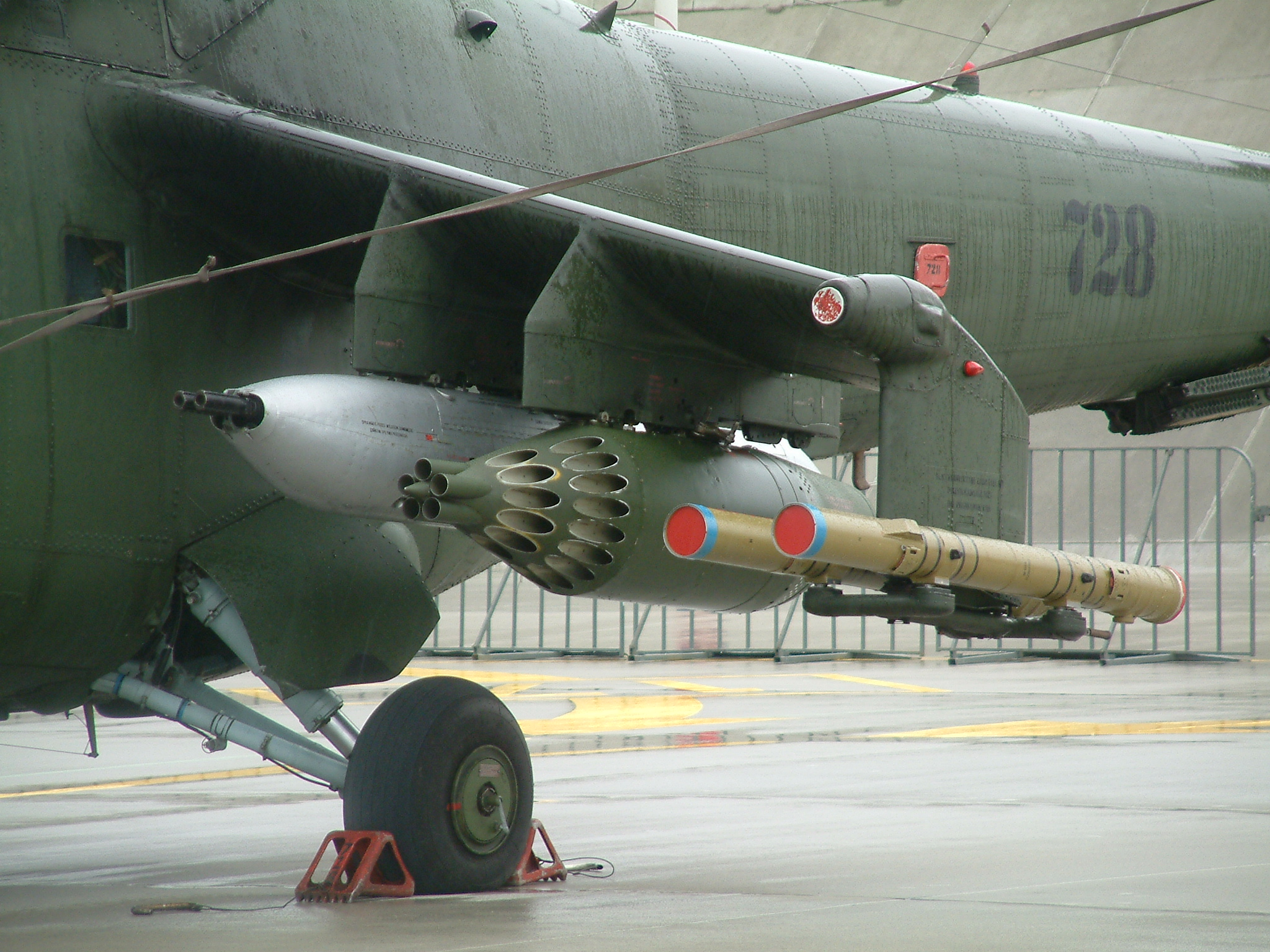
Possible armament configuration on Mi-24W

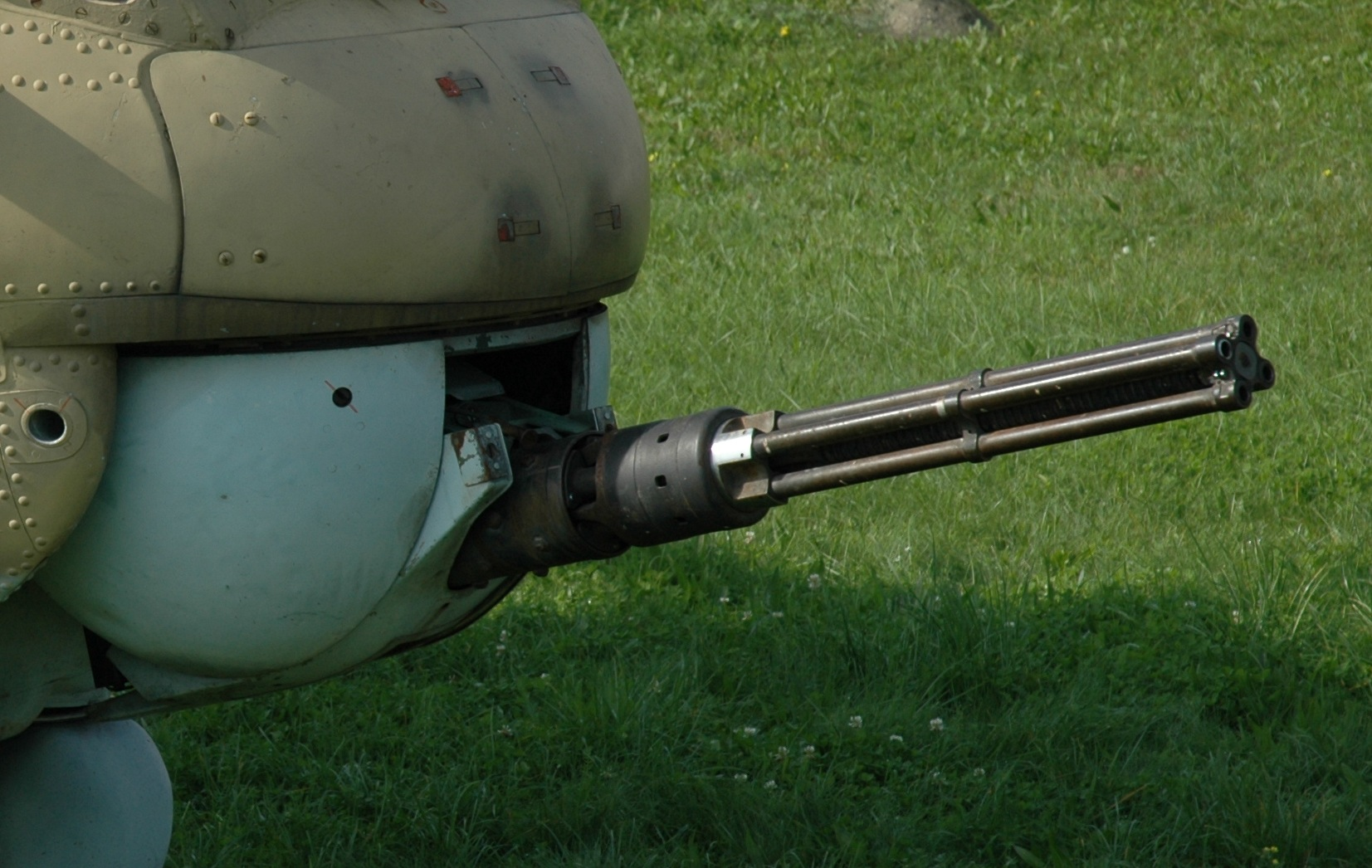
Yakushev-Borzov YakB-12.7 machine gun

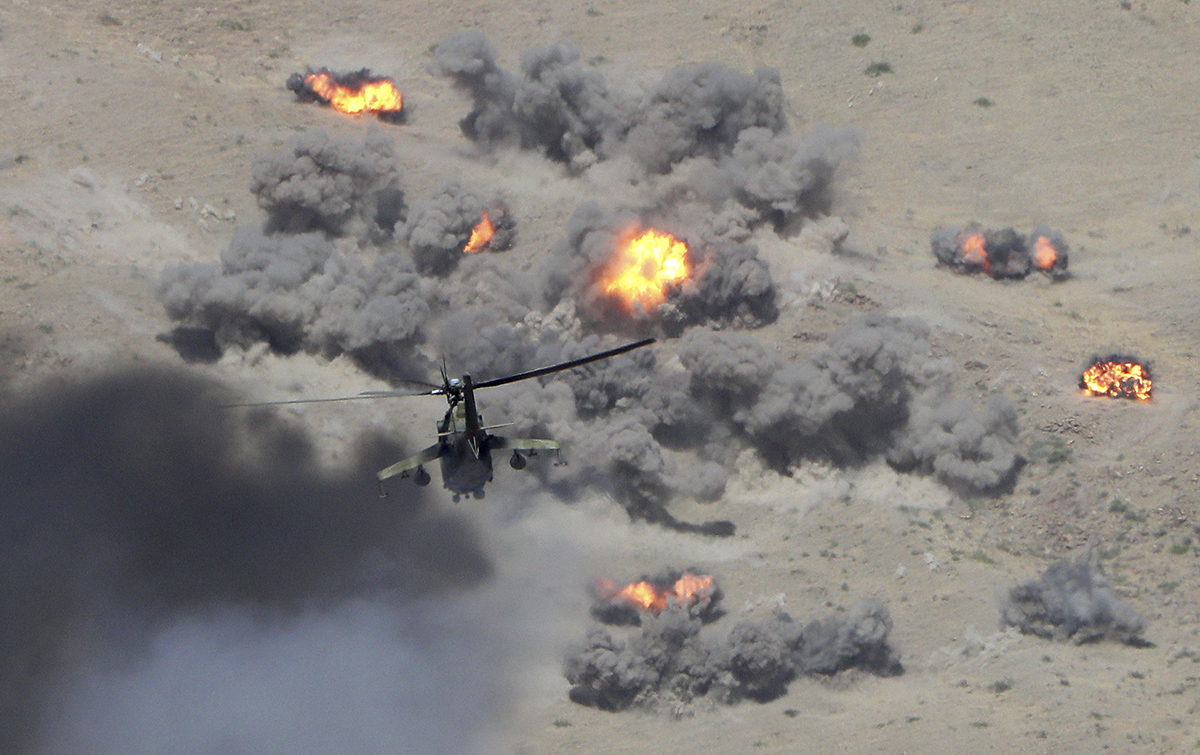
Mi-24 during "Centre 2019" exercise

Data from OE Data Integration Network

General characteristics

- Crew: 2 pilots, 1 weapons system officer and 1 technician (optional)
- Capacity: 8 troops / 4 stretchers / 2,400 kg (5,291 lb) cargo on an external sling
- Length: 17.5 m (57 ft 5 in) fuselage only

19.79 m (65 ft) including rotors

- Wingspan: 6.5 m (21 ft 4 in) stub wings
- Height: 6.5 m (21 ft 4 in)
- Empty weight: 8,500 kg (18,739 lb)
- Max takeoff weight: 12,000 kg (26,455 lb)
- Powerplant: 2 × Isotov TV3-117 turboshaft engines, 1,600 kW (2,200 shp) each
- Main rotor diameter: 17.2 m (56 ft 5 in)
- Main rotor area: 227 m^{2} (2,440 sq ft)

Performance

- Maximum speed: 320 km/h (200 mph, 170 kn)
- Cruise speed: 270 km/h (170 mph, 150 kn)
- Range: 450 km (280 mi, 240 nmi)
- Service ceiling: 5,750 m (18,860 ft)
- Rate of climb: 15 m/s (3,000 ft/min)

Armament

Internal guns
- flexible 12.7 mm Yakushev-Borzov Yak-B Heavy machine gun. (Original variant)
- flexible twin-barrel GSh-23L autocannon on the Mi-24VP, Mi-24VM and Mi-35M with 450 rounds. (Most variants)
- fixed twin-barrel GSh-30K autocannon on the Mi-24P. (Hind-F)
- PKB passenger compartment window mounted machine guns
External stores
- Total payload claimed is up to 2,400 kg of external stores from Mi-24P.
- Inner hardpoints can carry 500 kg.
- Outer hardpoints can carry 250 kg
- Wing-tip pylons can only carry the 9M17 Phalanga (in the Mi-24A-D), the 9K114 Shturm complex (in the Mi-24V-F) per each side.
Bomb load
- Bombs within weight range, up to 500 kg
- MBD multiple ejector racks
- KGMU2V submunition/mine dispenser pods
First-generation armament (standard production Mi-24D)
- GUV-8700 gunpod (with a 12.7 mm Yak-B + 2 × 7.62 mm GShG-7.62 mm combination or one 30 mm AGS-17)
- UB-16 S-5 rocket launchers
- UB-32 S-5 rocket launchers
- S-24 240 mm rocket
- 9M17 Fleyta (a pair on each wingtip pylon)
Second-generation armament (Mi-24V, Mi-24P and most upgraded Mi-24D)
- UPK-23-250 gunpod carrying the GSh-23L
- B-8V20 a lightweight long tubed helicopter version of the S-8 rocket launcher
- 9K114 Shturm in pairs on the outer and wingtip pylons
Anti-air missiles
- R-60, R-60M Infrared missiles
Both can be carried as either one or two per pylon.

== In popular culture ==
The Mi-24 has appeared in several films and has been a common feature in many video games.

== See also ==
Related development

- Mil Mi-8
- Mil Mi-14
- Mil Mi-28
- Mil Mi-36
- Mil Mi-40

Aircraft of comparable role, configuration, and era

- IAR 330 SOCAT
- Atlas XTP-1 Beta
- Mah Marineon
- Sikorsky AH-60L/S-70 Battlehawk
- Sikorsky S-67 Blackhawk
