= UnifiedPOS =

UnifiedPOS or UPOS is an international vendor and retailer driven Open Standard's initiative. Under the National Retail Federation, Association of Retail Technology Standards (NRF-ARTS), its aim is to provide vendor-neutral software application interfaces (APIs) for numerous (as of 2011, thirty-six) point of sale (POS) peripherals (POS printer, cash drawer, magnetic stripe reader, bar code scanner, line displays, etc.).

The goal is to allow retailers freedom of choice in the selection of POS peripheral devices by the creation, utilization, and promotion of standardized connectivity. UnifiedPOS is an abstraction standard that contains appendices which provide specific platform implementation information for Microsoft .NET and Java.

Developed by a team of joint retailer and industry technical experts following published policies and procedures, UnifiedPOS provides a consistent and exact framework for programming point of sale devices that is platform-independent and vendor-neutral.

Recent efforts (2010-2011) by the UnifiedPOS committee include provisions for local and remote POS peripheral support through a supplemental Web Services for point of service (WS-POS 1.1) standard. In addition, an increasing focus on using XML language commands to control the POS devices can be seen in the XML-POS Appendix in UnifiedPOS Version 1.13 standard.

== Management ==
The UnifiedPOS standard is managed by Association for Retail Technology Standards (ARTS) through two committees. The ARTS board is composed of international retailers and vendors from all industry segments. The principal responsibilities of this committee are to ensure that the standards it manages continues to expand in accordance with retailer requirements. The committee will specify changes to the standards and approve new devices. Membership in NRF-ARTS is required to participate in the administrative committee. Membership in NRF-ARTS is not required to download and use the UnifiedPOS standards.

The technical committee, composed of both vendors and retailers, modifies the UnifiedPOS specification based on guidance of the Administrative Committee. The technical committee provides support by resolving implementation issues or issues arising from the standard.

OPOS and JavaPOS implementation groups modify or enhance their actual program implementations to conform to the UnifiedPOS specification. The UnifiedPOS technical committee periodically audits the specific implementations to ensure the various groups conform to the UnifiedPOS specification.

In 2003, a .NET implementation was proposed, to the technical committee and subsequently accepted into the standard. This implementation is known as POS for .NET. . Microsoft has been criticized for not keeping up with the current revisions (1.13) to the UPOS standard. POS for .NET version 1.12 is not compatible with the current .NET Framework 4.0. However, On December 13, 2013, Microsoft released POS for .NET 1.14 CTP via Microsoft Connect. POS for .NET 1.14 is intended to conform to UPOS 1.14. The public release of POS for .NET is expected in Spring 2014.

In 2011 effort is underway to create an updated UnifiedPOS 2.0 standard which will add many enhanced features and functions to support newer programming paradigms and remote XML POS peripheral installation scenarios.

Since 2017, the Object Management Group has assumed responsibility for the UnifiedPos standard.

== Practical application of the UPOS standard ==
Although UPOS claims support for 36 device types, in practice most retailers will not be able to take advantage of many of these devices. For example, there are few, if any, UPOS service objects that support biometric or RFID types. Instead, most device manufacturers for these devices have created their own proprietary device drivers.

== See also ==
- National Retail Federation
- Point of sale
- Point-of-sale malware
