= Standard Interchange Language =

The Standard Interchange Language is a data interchange language standard developed by the Food Distribution Retails Systems Group for the interchange of information between software programs. It is a subset of SQL (Structured Query Language) and acts as an interface standard for transferring data between proprietary store systems like Direct Store Delivery and Point of sale. It was introduced in 1989 in the United States.
