= Coin dispenser =

Device that changes or dispenses coins

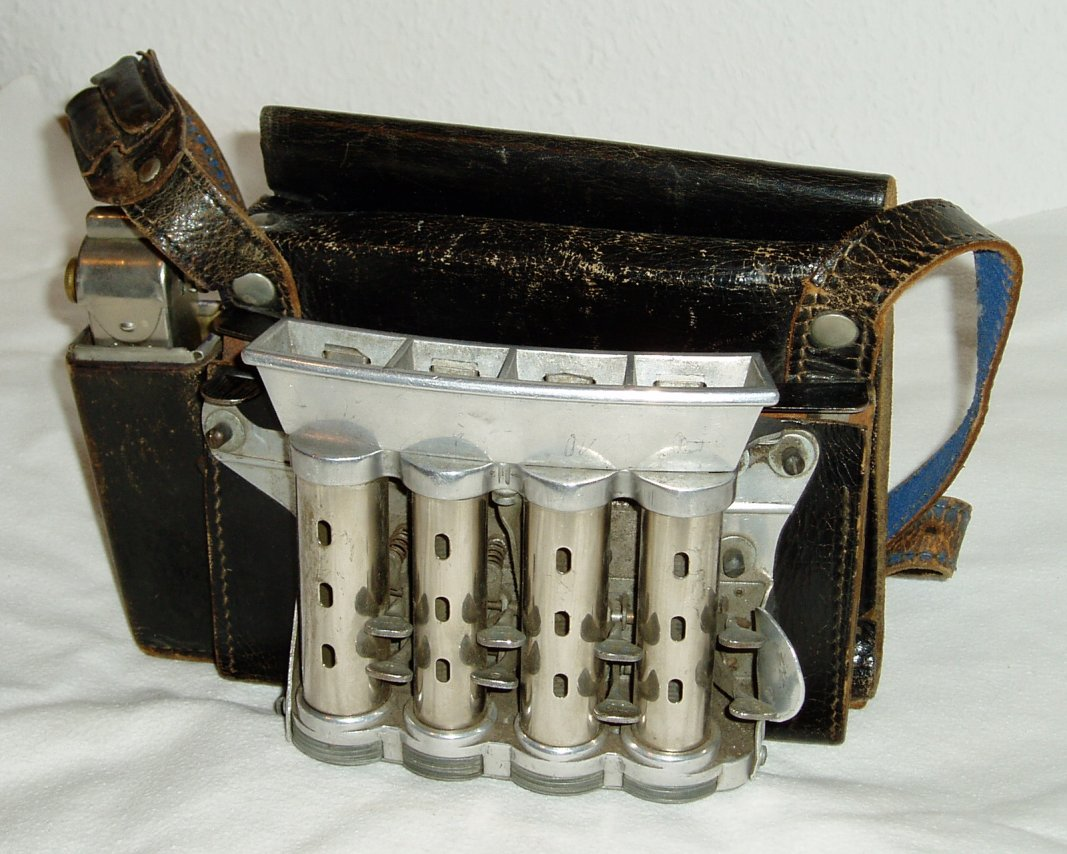
A coin dispenser

A coin dispenser (or coin changer or money changer) is a device that changes or dispenses coins. It can take various forms. One type is a portable coin dispenser, invented by Jacques L. Galef, often worn on a belt, used by conductors and other professions for manual fare collection. It dispenses a single coin when a lever is depressed.

Another type is a fixed coin dispenser that dispenses several coins at once, such as four quarters or five nickels, for making change at a venue for coin-operated devices, such as a penny arcade, pinball parlour, or Automat. It is typically mounted in a staffed booth or counter.

A third type, sometimes called a "change maker" or "automatic cashier", has an array of 100 or more buttons that dispense exact amounts of change from 1¢ to $1.00. These are typically found at teller windows in banks and sometimes in retail establishments. This type of change maker may also operate electromechanically under control of a cash register, automatically giving correct change for a customer's purchase.
