= Association for Retail Technology Standards =

The Association for Retail Technology Standards (ARTS) was an international standards organization dedicated to reducing the costs of technology through standards.

The Association for Retail Technology Standards (ARTS) was incorporated in 1993, after being founded in 1991 as a share group for retail CIOs. In 1998, ARTS was acquired by the National Retail Federation (NRF). In 2017, Object Management Group (OMG) and NRF agreed to manage and develop the retail standards as partners. It is now referred to as the Retail Domain Task Force (RDTF). OMG, a not-for-profit consortium, also owns entities such as UnifiedPOS.

== History ==
Since 1993, ARTS has been delivering application standards exclusively to the retail industry. ARTS has four standards

The Standard Relational Data Model, UnifiedPOS, ARTS XML and the Standard RFPs. It is a division of the National Retail Federation. These standards enable the rapid implementation of technology within the retail industry by developing standards to ease integration of software applications and hardware devices. ARTS offers testing services to verify that applications accurately incorporate these standards.

Hundreds of leading retailers and vendors worldwide contribute in shaping the ARTS Data Model. The ARTS Data Model is known as the information standard in the retail industry and provides a comprehensive design document containing all data elements and definitions required to support retail applications.

UnifiedPOS is a platform-neutral specification for connecting POS peripherals such as printers, scanners, and scales to the POS terminal, allowing retailers freedom of choice in the selection of hardware integration.

ARTS XML (formerly IXRetail) builds on the ARTS Data Model to develop standard XML schemas and message sets to ease application-to-application integration within a retail enterprise. There are currently 11 schemas available.

Standard RFPs (Requests for Proposal) were developed to help retailers choose the right applications for their specific business requirements. There are currently seven standardized template RFPs available for download.

Membership is open to all members of the international technology community, retailers from all industry segments, application developers and hardware companies. Membership requires a small fee, which is waived to those already members of the National Retail Federation, and an agreement to adhere to policies and standards regarding the licensing of any ARTS property.
