= Cash register =

Device to register and calculate retail sales

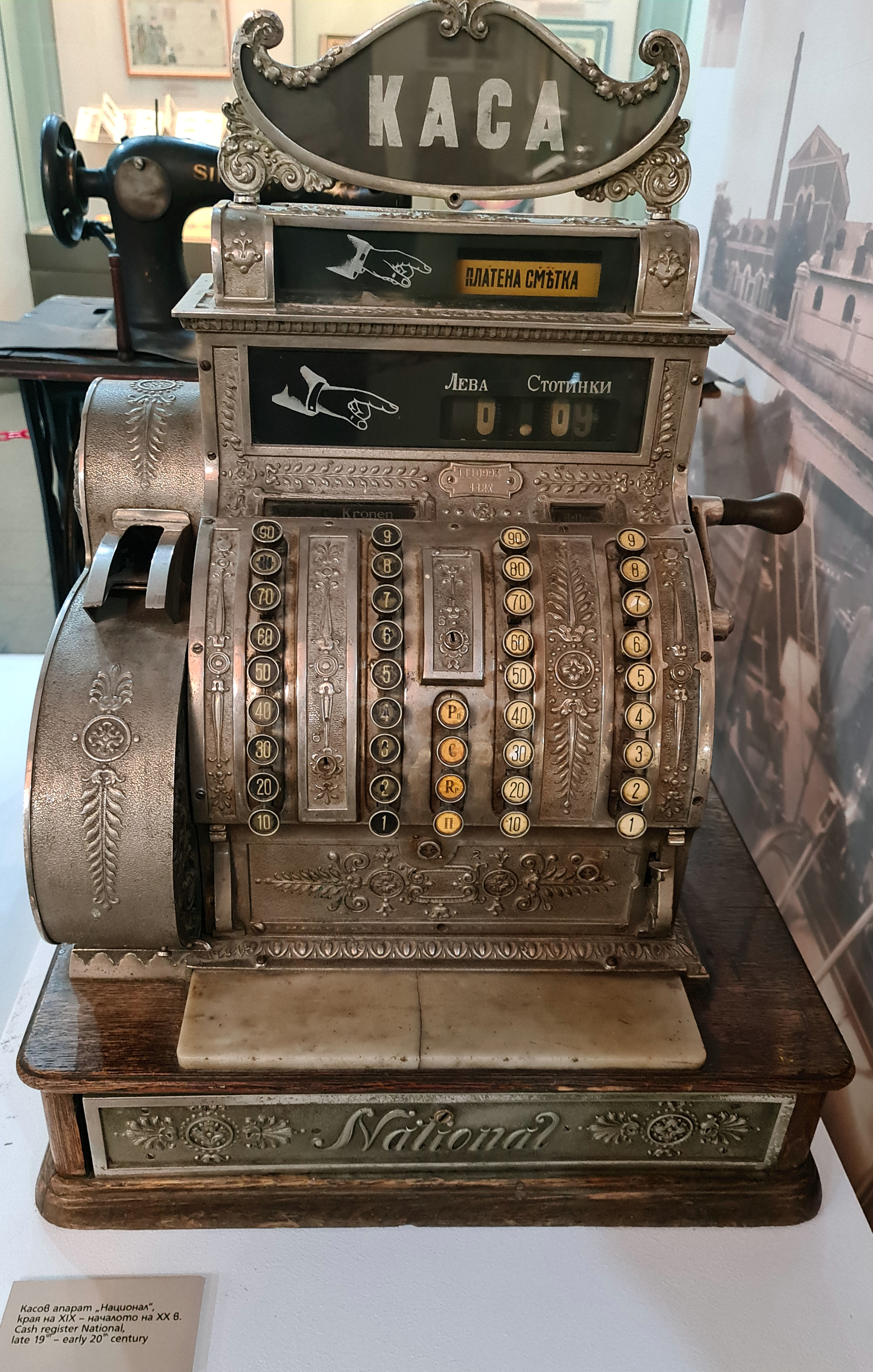
National cash register from the end of the 19th century, National History Museum, Sofia

A cash register, sometimes called a till or automated money handling system, is a mechanical or electronic device for registering and calculating transactions at a point of sale. It is usually attached to a drawer for storing cash and other valuables. A modern cash register is usually attached to a printer that can print out receipts for record-keeping purposes.

== History ==
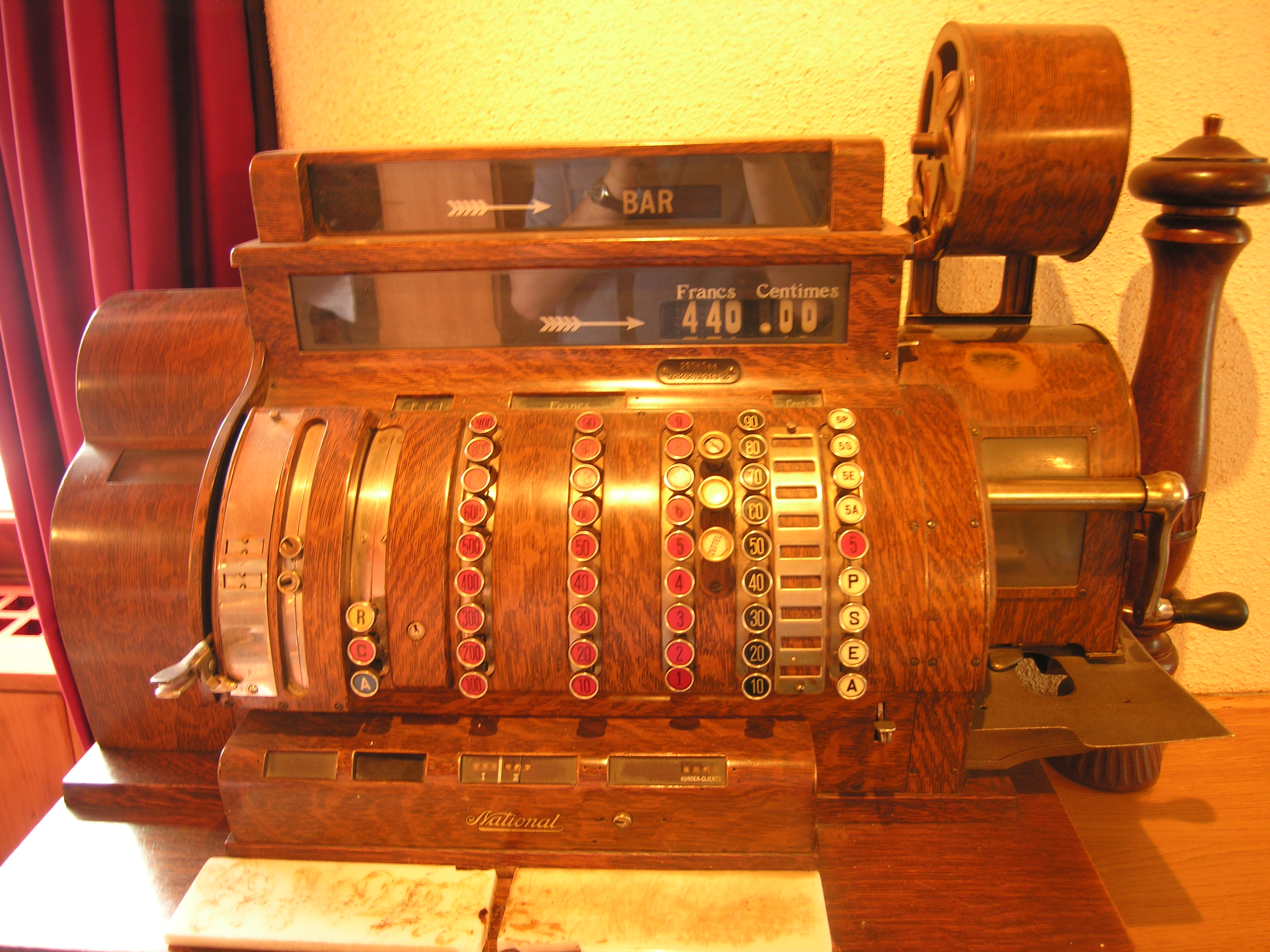
Antique crank-operated cash register, with display showing money in French francs and centimes

An early mechanical cash register was invented by James Ritty and John Birch following the American Civil War. James was the owner of a saloon in Dayton, Ohio, US, and believed his employees were embezzling by pocketing cash from customers or from the store's cash box. His solution was a machine that would record each sales transaction, producing a total at the close of the business day that could be compared to the amount of money in the till and the amount left over from the previous day, to determine if any was missing.

After being inspired by a machine on a steamship that counted the number of revolutions made by the propeller, and with the help of his brother John, James Ritty invented and patented his first machine, the Ritty Model I (also known as the Ritty Dial) in 1879.He then went on to produce additional models, including the "Incorruptible Cashier".

Early registers were entirely mechanical, and did not print receipts. The employee was required to ring up every transaction on the register, and when the total key was pushed, the drawer opened and a bell would ring, confirming to the customer that the sale was properly rung up. Those original machines were nothing but simple adding machines. For example, the Rittys' patent application filed in 1879 for their "improved cash register" describes the device as follows: "The machine consists, essentially, of an inclosed case or frame provided with an index dial and indicator operated by a system of levers or keys and connected with a series of co-operating disks marked with numbers on their peripheries, a row of which numbers are disclosed by a transverse opening or openings in the case to show at a glance the sum-total of cash receipts."

Since the registration is done with the process of returning change, according to Bill Bryson odd pricing came about because by charging odd amounts like 49 and 99 cents (or 45 and 95 cents when nickels are more used than pennies), the cashier very probably had to open the till for the penny change and thus announce the sale.

Shortly after the patent, Ritty became overwhelmed with the responsibilities of running two businesses, so he sold all of his interests in the cash register business to Jacob H. Eckert of Cincinnati, a china and glassware salesman, who formed the National Manufacturing Company. In 1884 Eckert sold the company to John H. Patterson, who renamed the company the National Cash Register Company and improved the cash register by adding a paper roll to record sales transactions, thereby creating the journal for internal bookkeeping purposes, and the receipt for external bookkeeping purposes. The original purpose of the receipt was enhanced fraud protection. The business owner could read the receipts to ensure that cashiers charged customers the correct amount for each transaction and did not embezzle the cash drawer. It also prevents a customer from defrauding the business by falsely claiming receipt of a lesser amount of change or a transaction that never happened in the first place.

In 1906, while working at the National Cash Register company, inventor Charles F. Kettering designed a cash register with an electric motor.

A leading designer, builder, manufacturer, seller and exporter of cash registers from the 1950s until the 1970s was London-based (and later Brighton-based) Gross Cash Registers Ltd., founded by brothers Sam and Henry Gross. Their cash registers were particularly popular around the time of decimalisation in Britain in early 1971, Henry having designed one of the few known models of cash register which could switch currencies from £sd to £p so that retailers could easily change from one to the other on or after Decimal Day. Sweda also had decimal-ready registers where the retailer used a special key on Decimal Day for the conversion.

== In current use ==
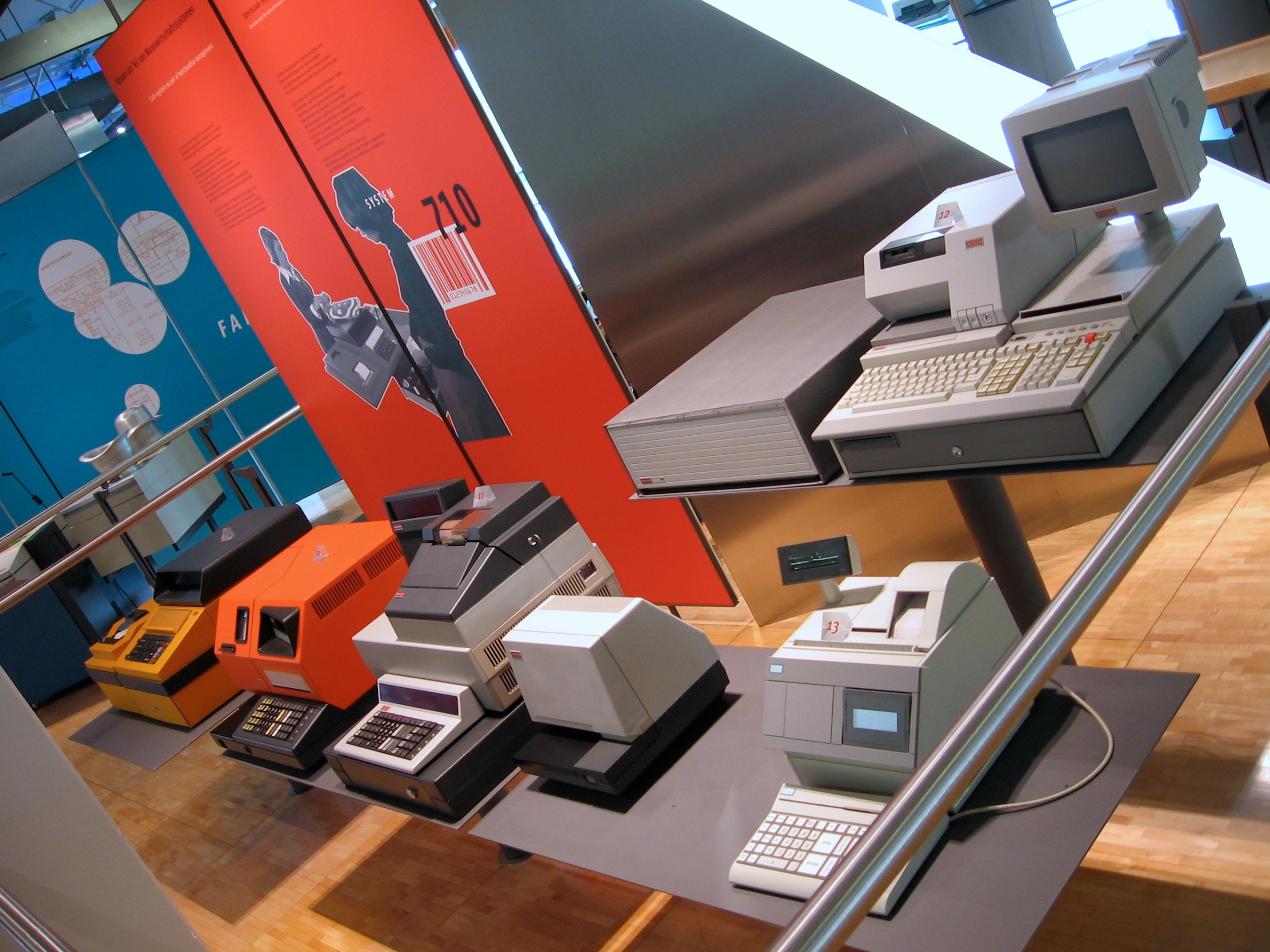
Various types of modern cash registers

In some jurisdictions the law also requires customers to collect the receipt and keep it at least for a short while after leaving the shop, to check that the shop records sales, so that it cannot evade sales taxes.

Often cash registers are attached to scales, barcode scanners, checkstands, and debit card or credit card terminals. Increasingly, dedicated cash registers are being replaced with general purpose computers with POS software.

Today, point of sale systems scan the barcode (usually EAN or UPC) for each item, retrieve the price from a database, calculate deductions for items on sale (or, in British retail terminology, "special offer", "multibuy" or "buy one, get one free"), calculate the sales tax or VAT, calculate differential rates for preferred customers, actualize inventory, time and date stamp the transaction, record the transaction in detail including each item purchased, record the method of payment, keep totals for each product or type of product sold as well as total sales for specified periods, and do other tasks as well. These POS terminals will often also identify the cashier on the receipt, and carry additional information or offers.

Currently, many cash registers are individual computers. They may be running in-house software or general purpose software. Many of the newer ones have touch screens. They may be connected to computerized point of sale networks using any type of protocol. Such systems may be accessed remotely for the purpose of obtaining records or troubleshooting. Many businesses also use tablet computers as cash registers, utilizing the sale system as downloadable app-software.

=== Cash drawer ===
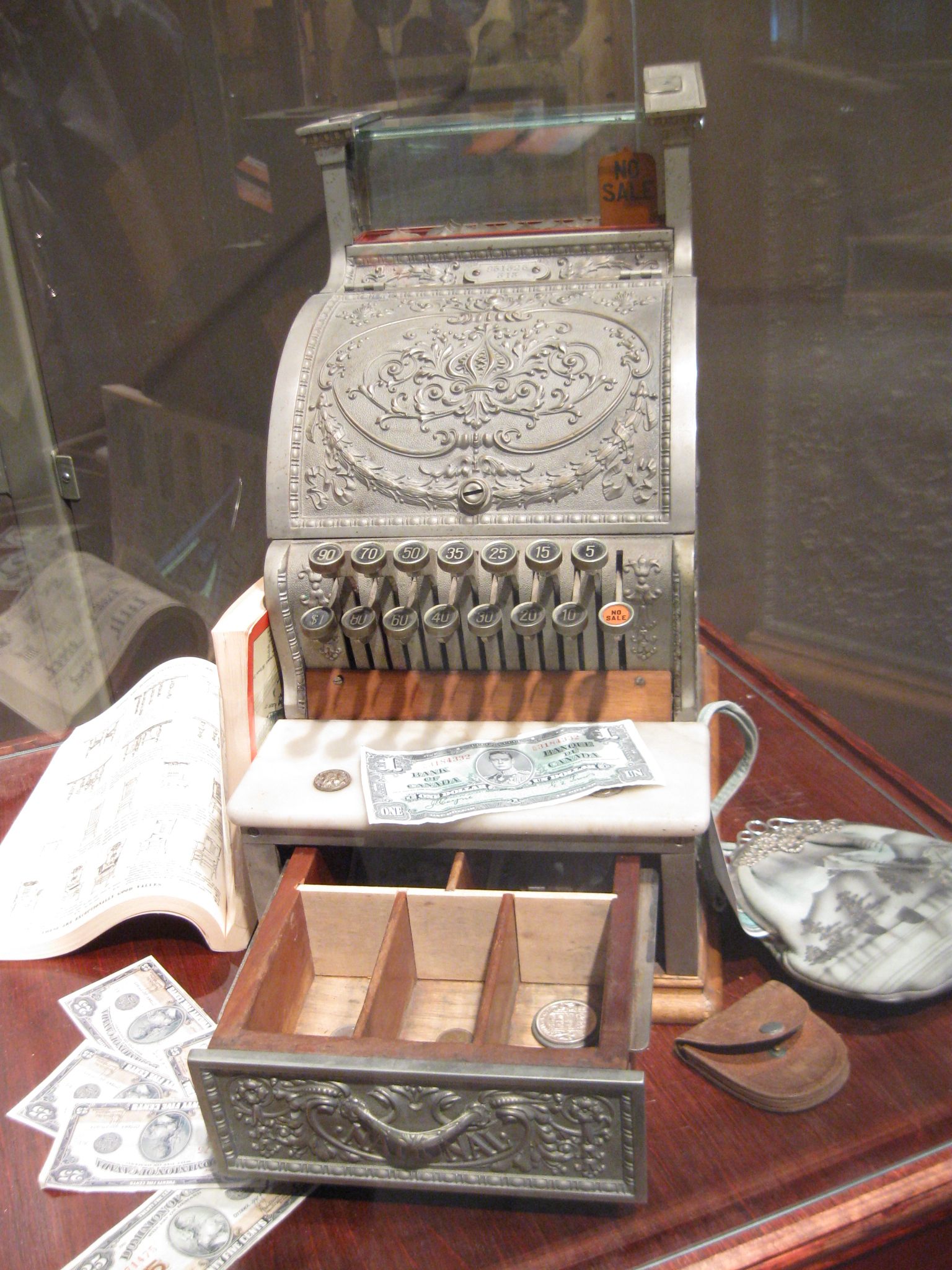
Old Canadian general store shopping register model, City of Surrey Museum, British Columbia, Canada

A cash drawer is usually a compartment underneath a cash register in which the cash from transactions is kept. The drawer typically contains a removable till. The till is usually a plastic or wooden tray divided into compartments used to store each denomination of bank notes and coins separately in order to make counting easier. The removable till allows money to be removed from the sales floor to a more secure location for counting and creating bank deposits. Some modern cash drawers are individual units separate from the rest of the cash register.

A cash drawer is usually of strong construction and may be integral with the register or a separate piece that the register sits atop. It slides in and out of its lockable box and is secured by a spring-loaded catch. When a transaction that involves cash is completed, the register sends an electrical impulse to a solenoid to release the catch and open the drawer. Cash drawers that are integral to a stand-alone register often have a manual release catch underneath to open the drawer in the event of a power failure. More advanced cash drawers have eliminated the manual release in favor of a cylinder lock, requiring a key to manually open the drawer. The cylinder lock usually has several positions: locked, unlocked, online (will open if an impulse is given), and release. The release position is an intermittent position with a spring to push the cylinder back to the unlocked position. In the "locked" position, the drawer will remain latched even when an electric impulse is sent to the solenoid.

Some cash drawers are designed to store notes upright & facing forward, instead of the traditional flat and front to back position. This allows more varieties of notes to be stored. Some cash drawers are flip top in design, where they flip open instead of sliding out like an ordinary drawer, resembling a cashbox instead.

A cash register's drawer can only be opened by an instruction from the cash register except when using special keys, generally held by the owner and some employees (e.g. manager). This reduces the amount of contact most employees have with cash and other valuables. It also reduces risks of an employee taking money from the drawer without a record and the owner's consent, such as when a customer does not expressly ask for a receipt but still has to be given change (cash is more easily checked against recorded sales than inventory). Cash registers include a key labeled "No Sale", abbreviated "NS" on many modern electronic cash registers. Its function is to open the drawer, printing a receipt stating "No Sale" and recording in the register log that the register was opened. Some cash registers require a numeric password or physical key to be used when attempting to open the till.

=== Management functions ===
An often used non-sale function is the aforementioned "no sale". In case of needing to correct change given to the customer, or to make change from a neighboring register, this function will open the cash drawer of the register. Where non-management staff are given access, management can scrutinize the count of "no sales" in the log to look for suspicious patterns. Generally requiring a management key, besides programming prices into the register, are the report functions. An X-report will read the current sales figures from memory and produce a paper printout. A Z-report will act like an "X" report, except that counters will be reset to zero.

=== Manual input ===
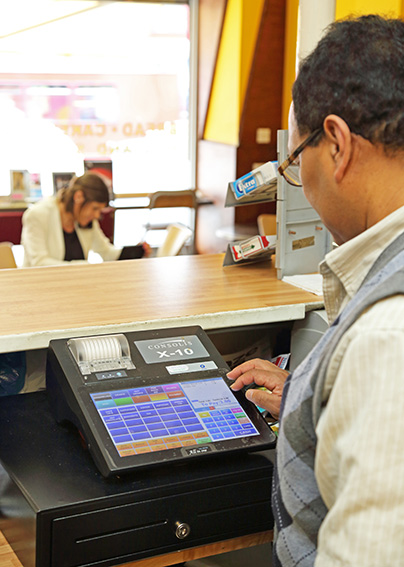
Modern cash register with touchscreen interface

Registers will typically feature a numerical pad, QWERTY or custom keyboard, touch screen interface, or a combination of these input methods for the cashier to enter products and fees by hand and access information necessary to complete the sale. For older registers as well as at restaurants and other establishments that do not sell barcoded items, the manual input may be the only method of interacting with the register. While customization was previously limited to larger chains that could afford to have physical keyboards custom-built for their needs, the customization of register inputs is now more widespread with the use of touch screens that can display a variety of point of sale software.

=== Scanner ===
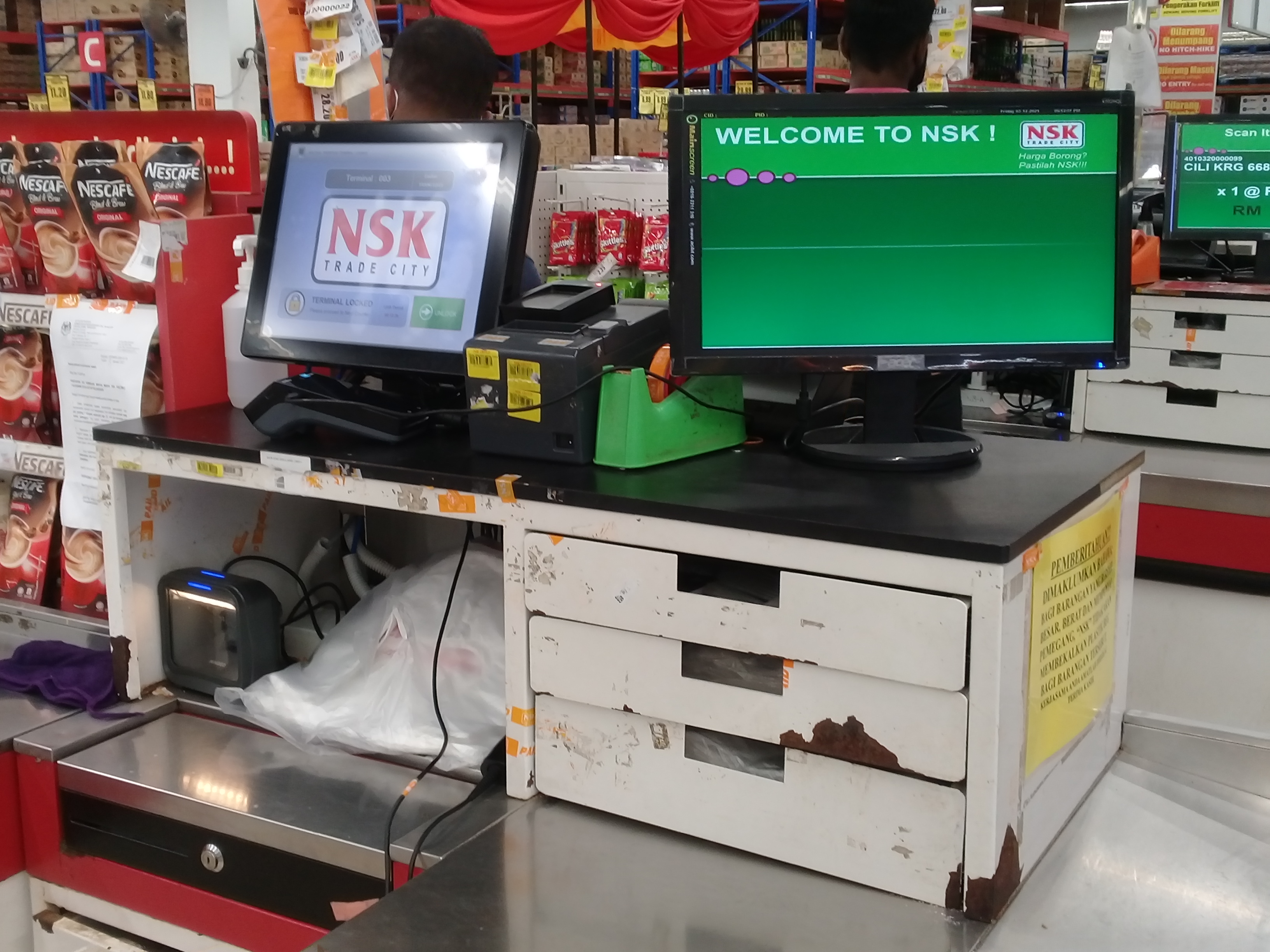
Modern point-of-sale system with stationary barcode scanner below the monitor, installed at NSK Trade City branch in Kota Damansara, Malaysia

Modern cash registers may be connected to a handheld or stationary barcode reader so that a customer's purchases can be more rapidly scanned than would be possible by keying numbers into the register by hand. The use of scanners should also help prevent errors that result from manually entering the product's barcode or pricing. At grocers, the register's scanner may be combined with a scale for measuring product that is sold by weight.

=== Receipt printer ===
Cashiers are often required to provide a receipt to the customer after a purchase has been made. Registers typically use thermal printers to print receipts, although older dot matrix printers are still in use at some retailers. Alternatively, retailers can forgo issuing paper receipts in some jurisdictions by instead asking the customer for an email to which their receipt can be sent. The receipts of larger retailers tend to include unique barcodes or other information identifying the transaction so that the receipt can be scanned to facilitate returns or other customer services.

=== Security deactivation ===
In stores that use electronic article surveillance, a pad or other surface will be attached to the register that deactivates security devices embedded in or attached to the items being purchased. This will prevent a customer's purchase from setting off security alarms at the store's exit.

=== Remote peripherals ===
In settings like a restaurant, remote pheripherals are sometimes used to speed up processing of orders. These include printers or screens in the kitchen to show staff the incoming orders. Waiters often use mobile devices like phones or tablets connected to a central cash register to takes orders and can use small, mobile bluetooth printers to print receipts directly at the table.

== Self-service cash register ==
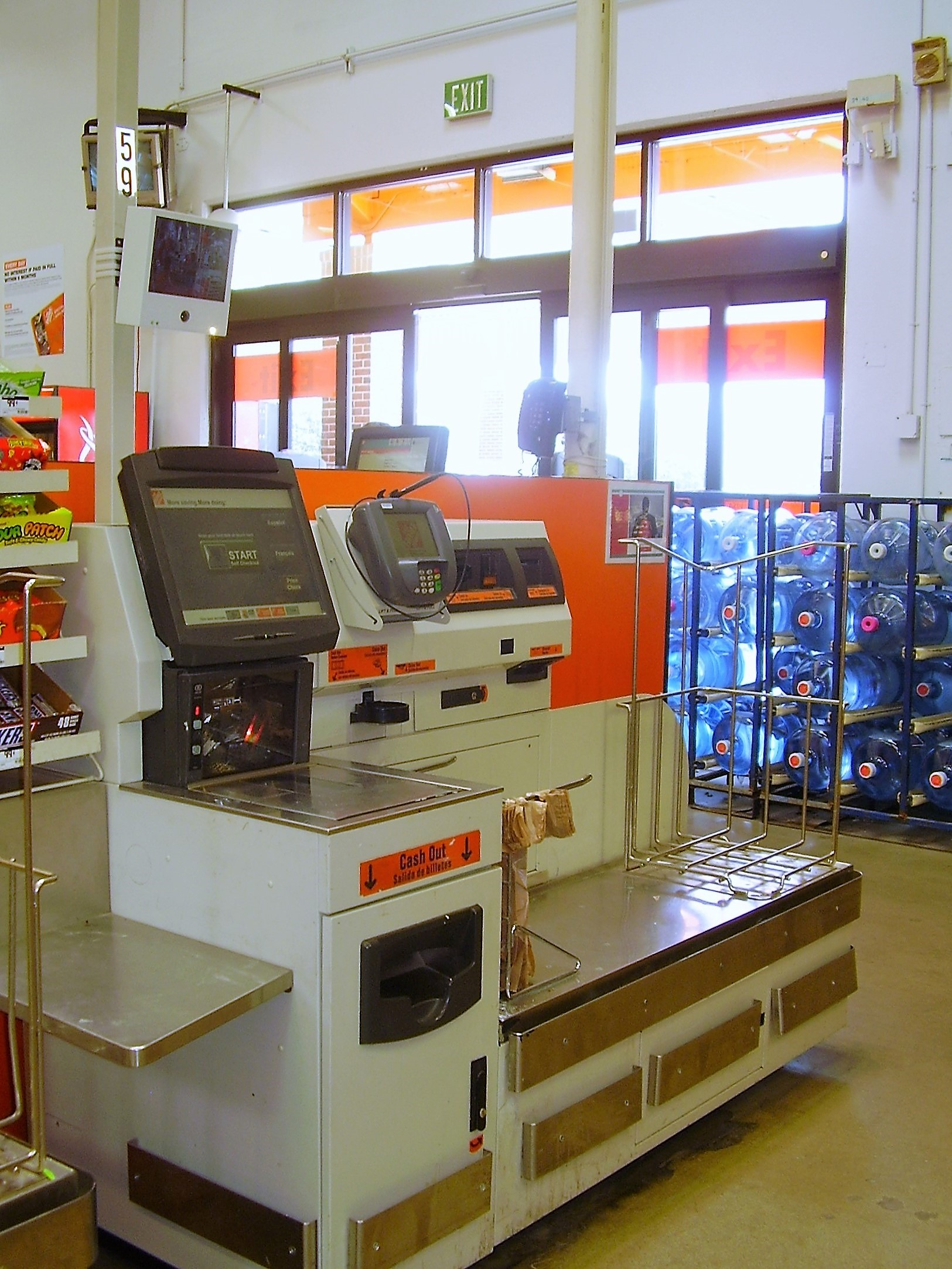
Self-checkout machine at a Home Depot store, Pin Oak, Houston, Texas

Some corporations and supermarkets have introduced self-checkout machines, where the customer is trusted to scan the barcodes (or manually identify uncoded items like fruit), and place the items into a bagging area. The bag is weighed, and the machine halts the checkout when the weight of something in the bag does not match the weight in the inventory database. Normally, an employee is watching over several such checkouts to prevent theft or exploitation of the machines' weaknesses (for example, intentional misidentification of expensive produce or dry goods). Payment on these machines is accepted by debit card/credit card, or cash via coin slot and bank note scanner. Store employees are also needed to authorize "age-restricted" purchases, such as alcohol, solvents or knives, which can either be done remotely by the employee observing the self-checkout, or by means of a "store login" which the operator has to enter.

== Gallery ==
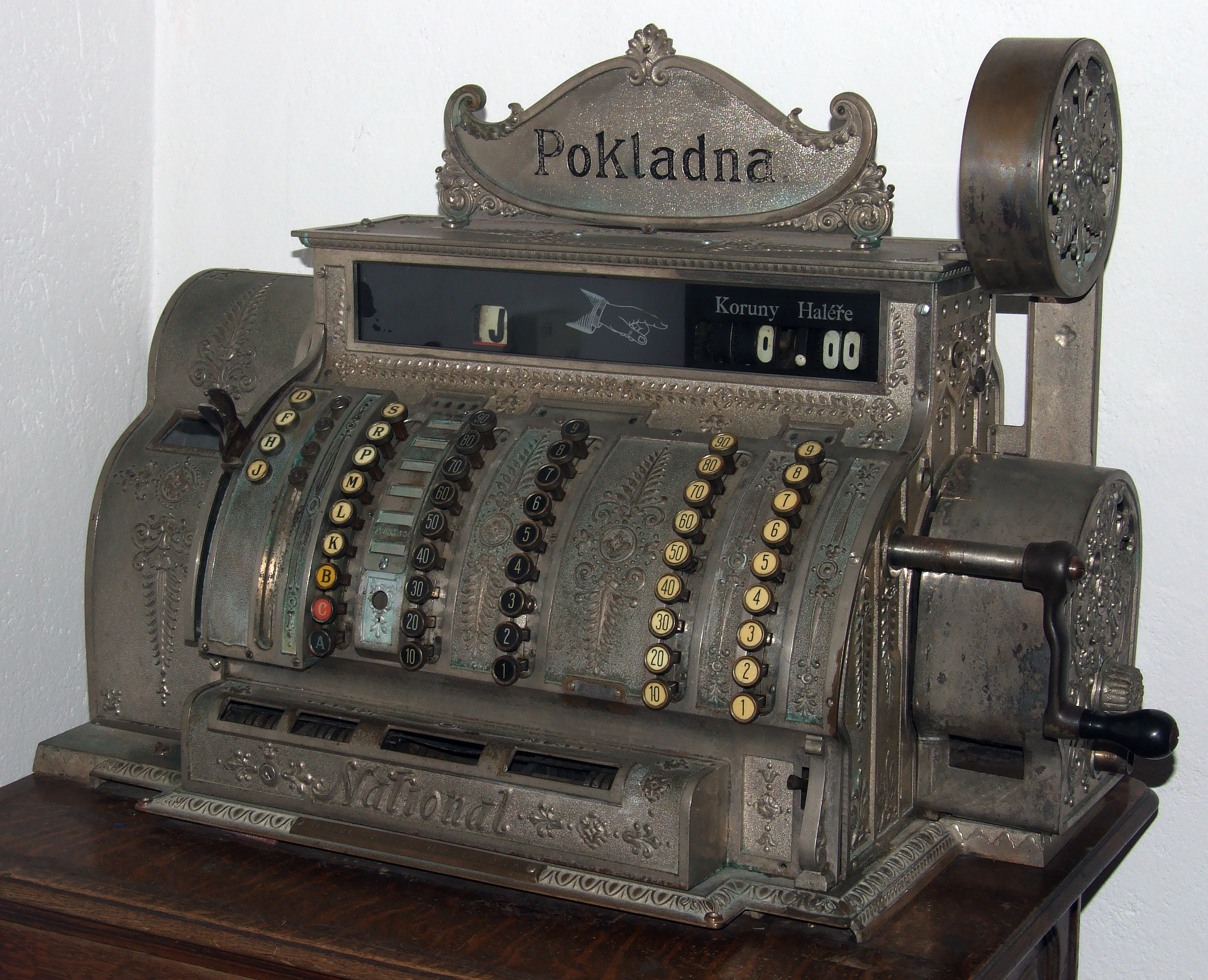
National Cash Register expressly built for a merchant in Nové Město nad Metují, Austro-Hungary, 1904

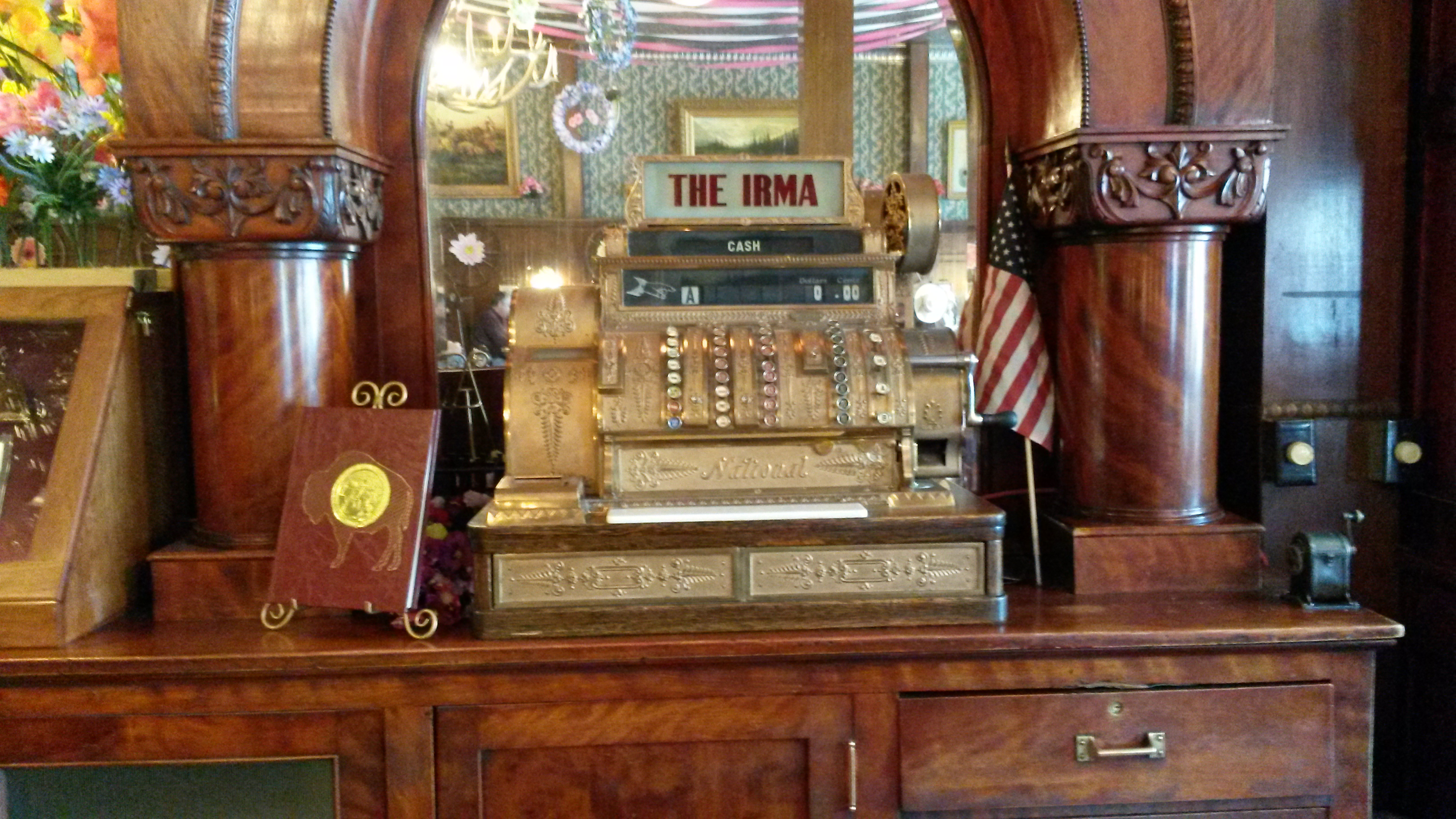
National Cash Register in the Irma Hotel, Cody, WY.

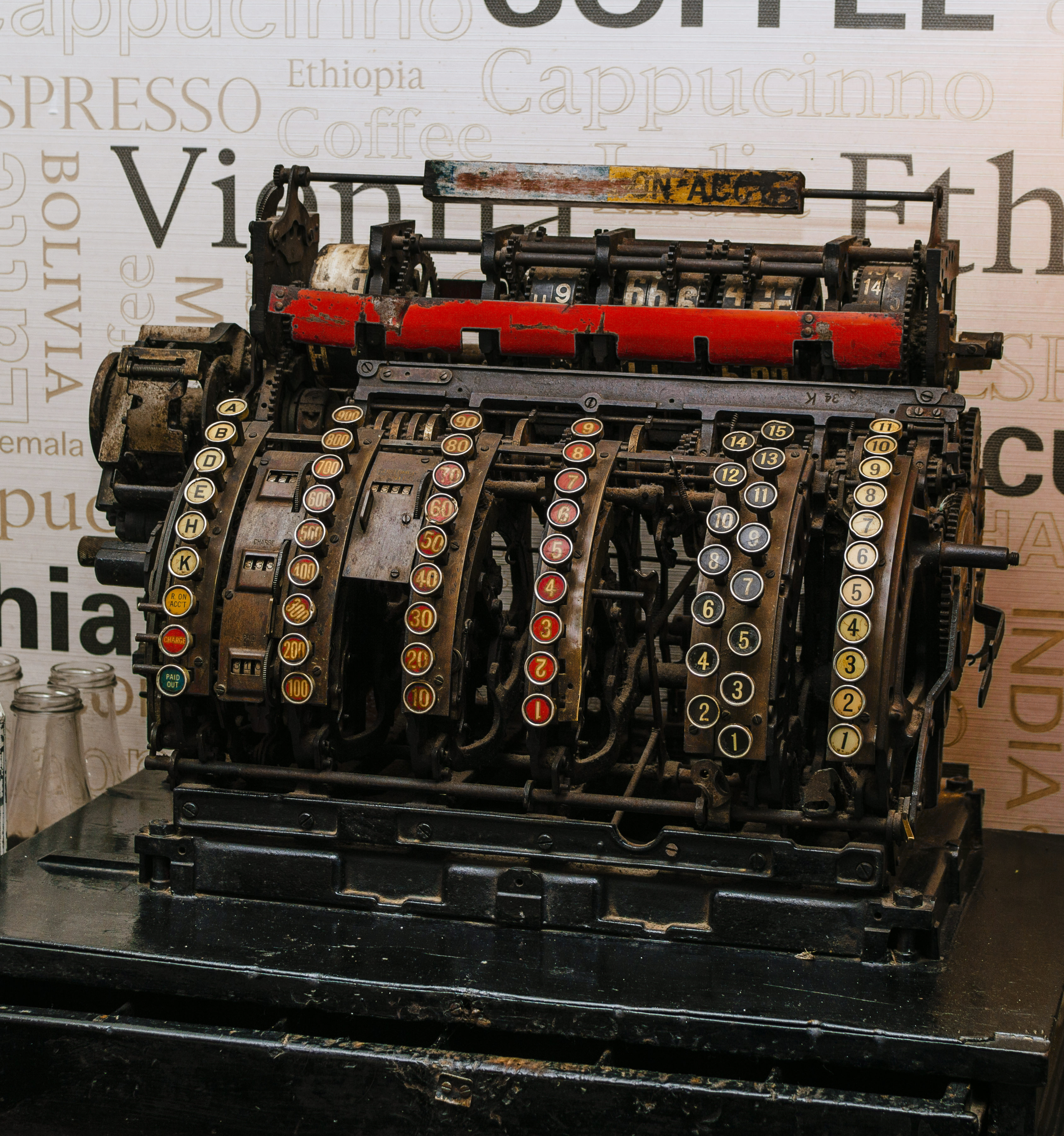
Antique cash register in a cafe, Darjeeling

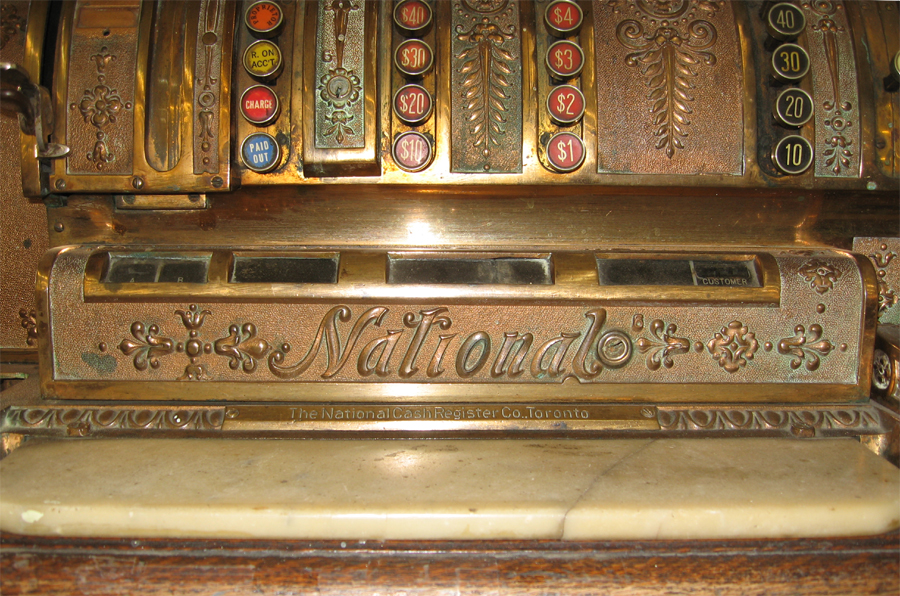
National Cash Register

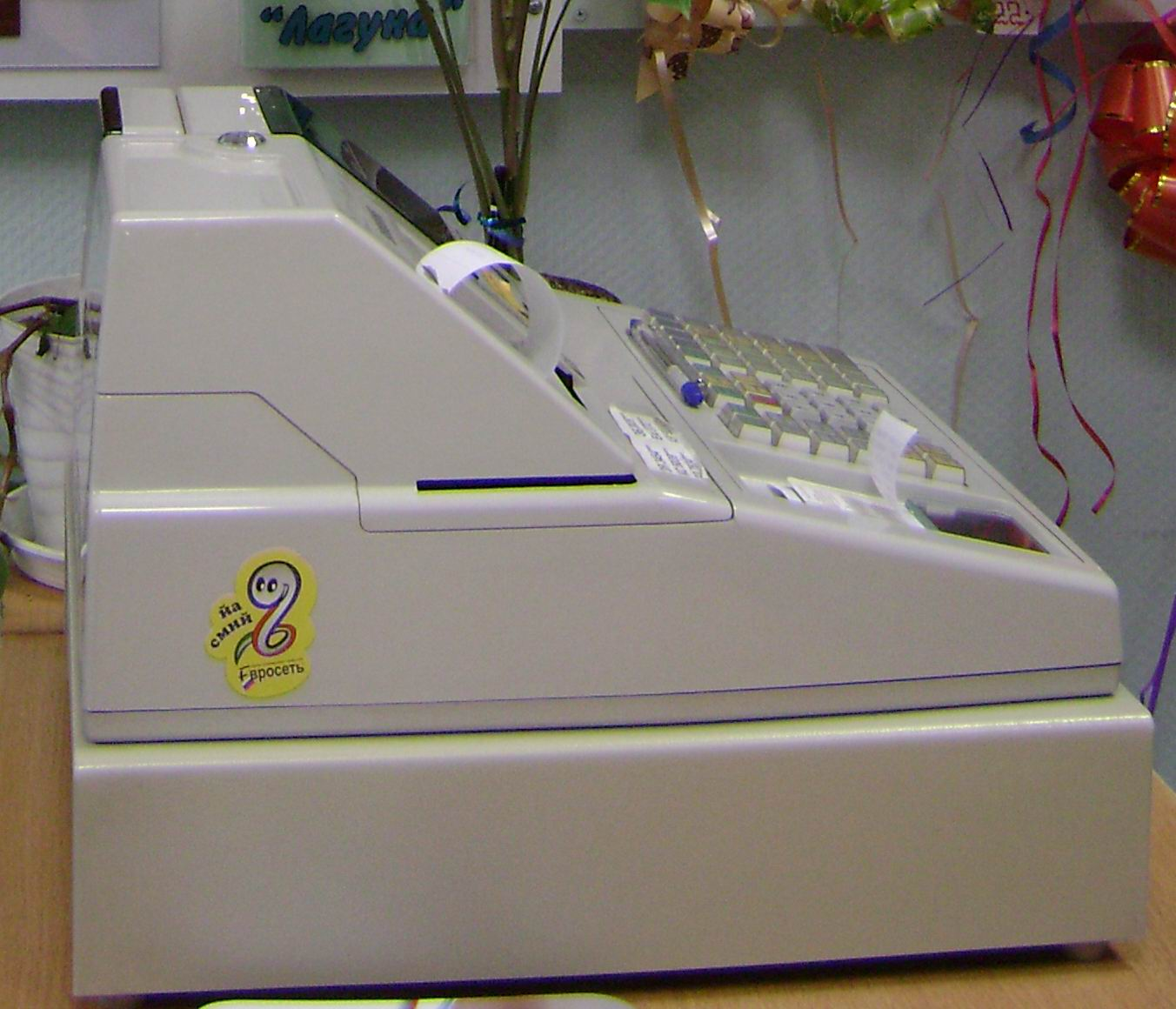
Cash register in a store in Severodvinsk, Russia, 2009

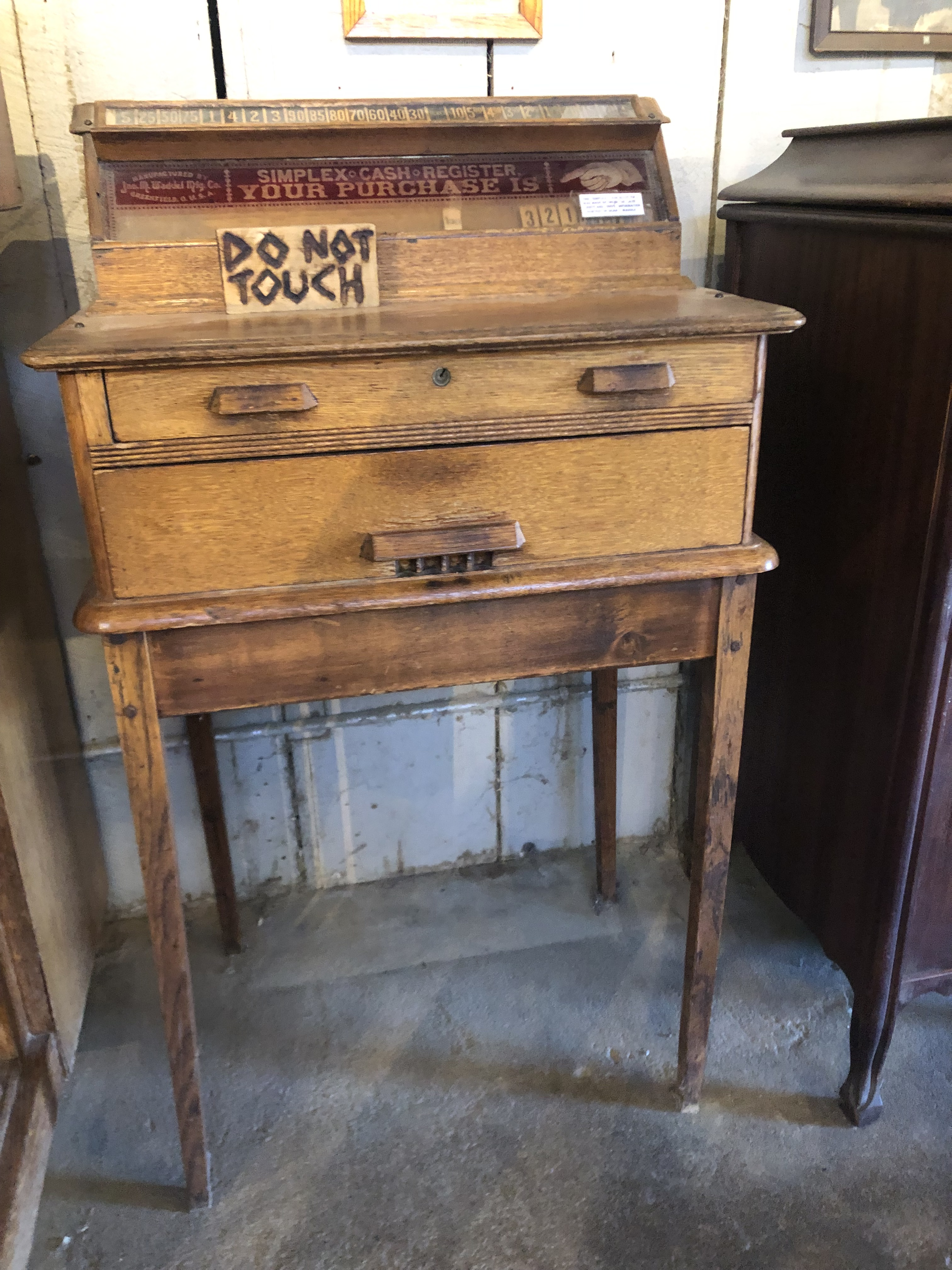
Simplex cash register, which was operated by putting marbles into holes at the top of the machine to ring up the sale. The marbles rolled through chutes into the top drawer (which was locked by the store owner) to record the day's sales. On display at the Western Trails Museum, Knott's Berry Farm, Buena Park, CA

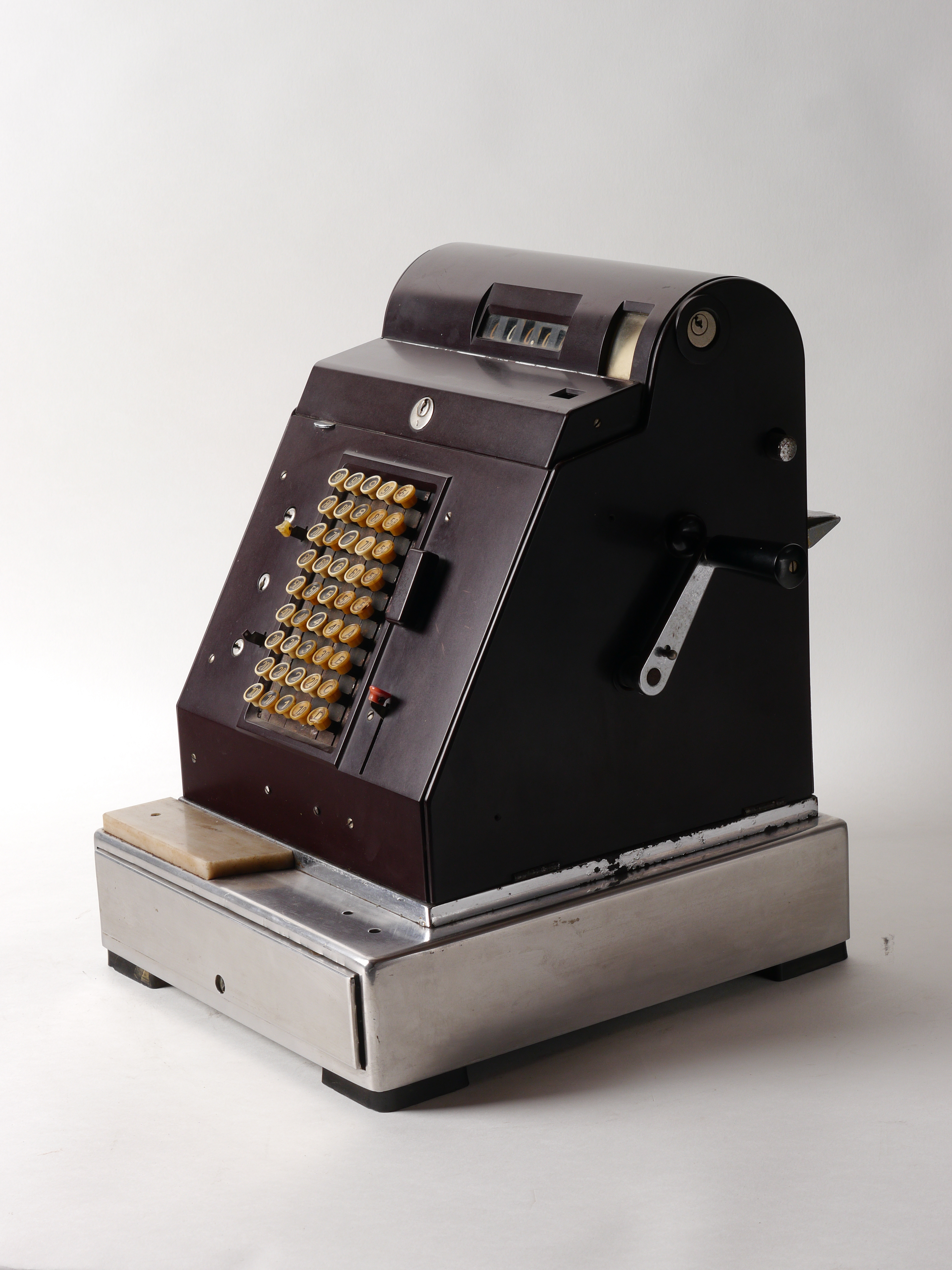
Cash register in bakelite, collection Museum of Industry Ghent

== See also ==
- Credit card terminal
- EFTPOS
- Point of sale
- Point of sale display
