= Point of sale display =

Sales promoted

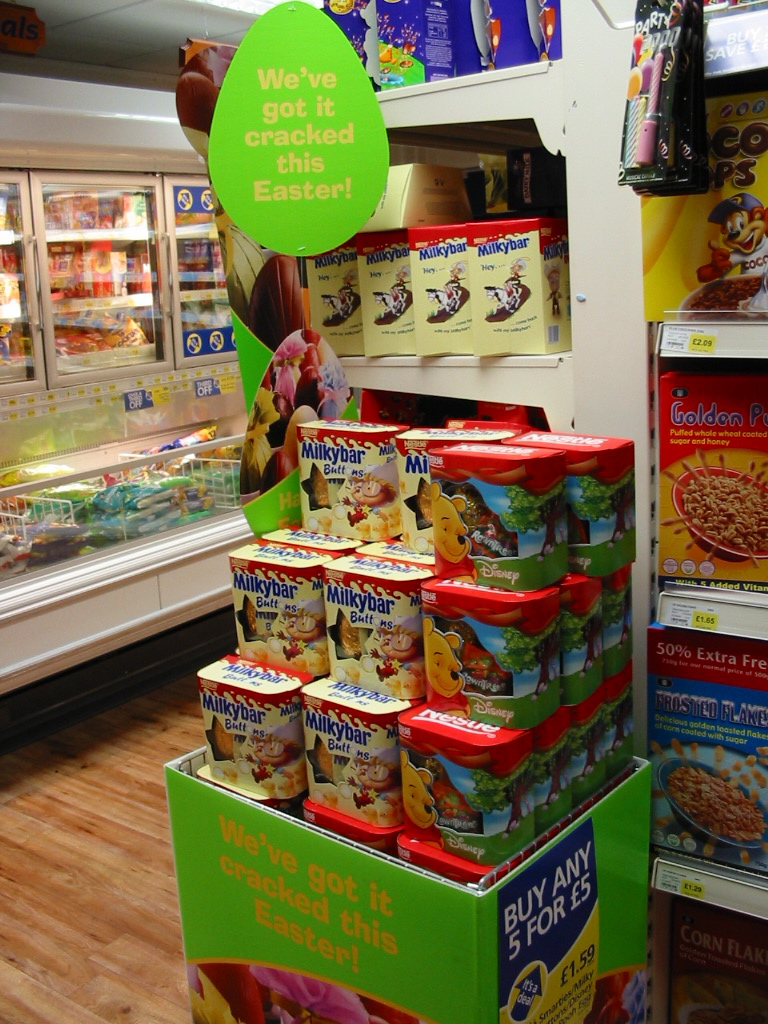
A point-of-sale display selling products related to the Easter holiday

A point-of-sale display (POS display) is a specialised form of sales promotion that is found near, on, or next to a checkout counter (the "point of sale"). They are intended to draw the customers' attention to products, which may be new products, or on special offer, and are also used to promote special events, e.g. seasonal or holiday-time sales. POS displays can include free standing display units (FSDU), shelf edging, dummy packs, strut cards, standees, hanging signs, counter display units (CDU), display packs, endcaps, display stands, mobiles, posters, and banners.

POS can also refer to systems used to record transactions between the customer and the commerce.

== Examples ==
Usually, in smaller retail outlets, POS displays are supplied by the manufacturer of the products, and also sited, restocked and maintained by one of their regular salespersons. This is less common in supermarkets as they can control the activities of their suppliers due to their large purchasing power, and prefer to use their own material designed to be consistent with their corporate theme and store layout.

=== Free standing display units (FSDUs) ===
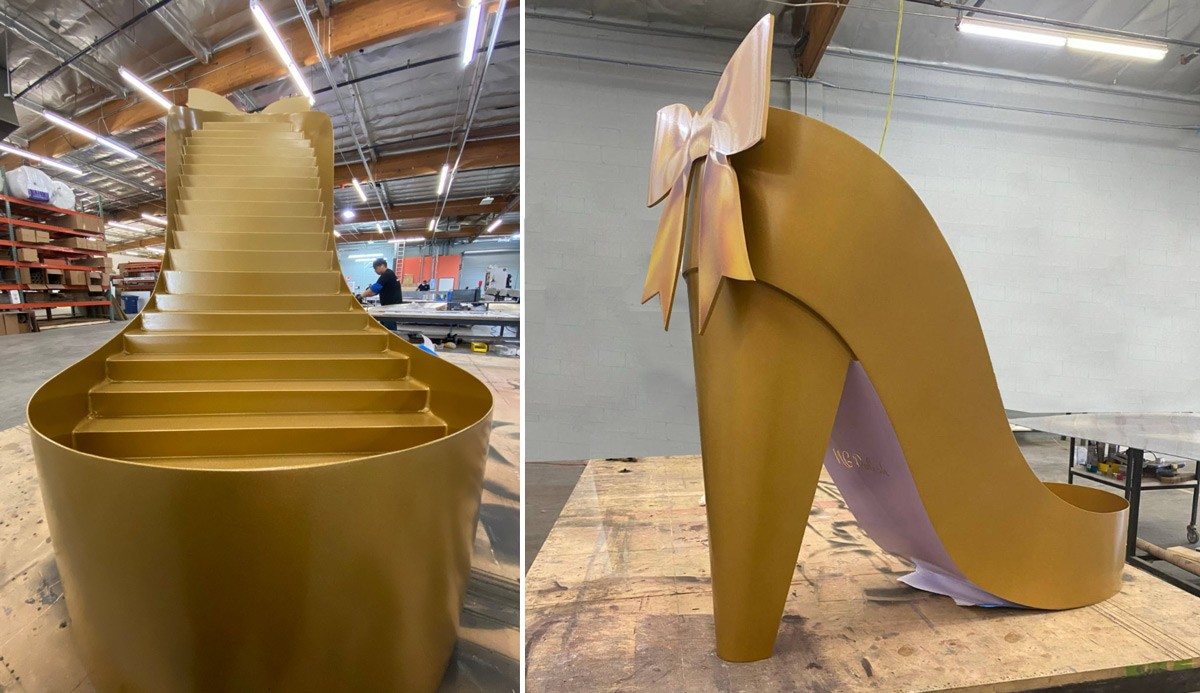
Free standing display unit in the shape of a shoe

Free standing display units are designed to attract the attention of customers and promote key retail products or messages. They are often placed strategically within the customer journey, and utilize bright colours and graphics to stand out visually and encourage shoppers to buy. Retailers have been criticized for using FSDUs near checkouts to promote sugary snacks.

== See also ==
- Packaging – Enclosure or protection of products
- Point of sale – Time and place where a retail transaction is completed
- Sales promotion – Short-term incentive to initiate trial or purchase
