= Sergey Nepobedimy =

Russian engineer (1921–2014)

Sergey Pavlovich Nepobedimyi
- Born: 13 September 1921; Ryazan, USSR
- Died: 11 April 2014 (aged 92); Kolomna, Russia
- Occupation: engineer at CNIIAG
- Spouse(s): Lora Ivanovna Nepobedimaya (Kuvshinova, 1923 — 1997)
- Children: daughter - Nataliya Sergeevna Fokina (Nepobedimaya, b. 1943)

Sergey Pavlovich Nepobedimy (Russian: Серге́й Па́влович Непобеди́мый; 13 September 1921 – 11 April 2014) was a Soviet designer of rocket weaponry. He was the Head and Chief Designer of the Kolomna Mechanical Engineering Design Bureau (1965-1989). Born in Ryazan, USSR, he graduated from Bauman Moscow State Technical University in 1945 and was directed to the work at SKB-101 (KBM, currently FSUE «KB Mashinostroyeniya») of Boris Shavyrin.

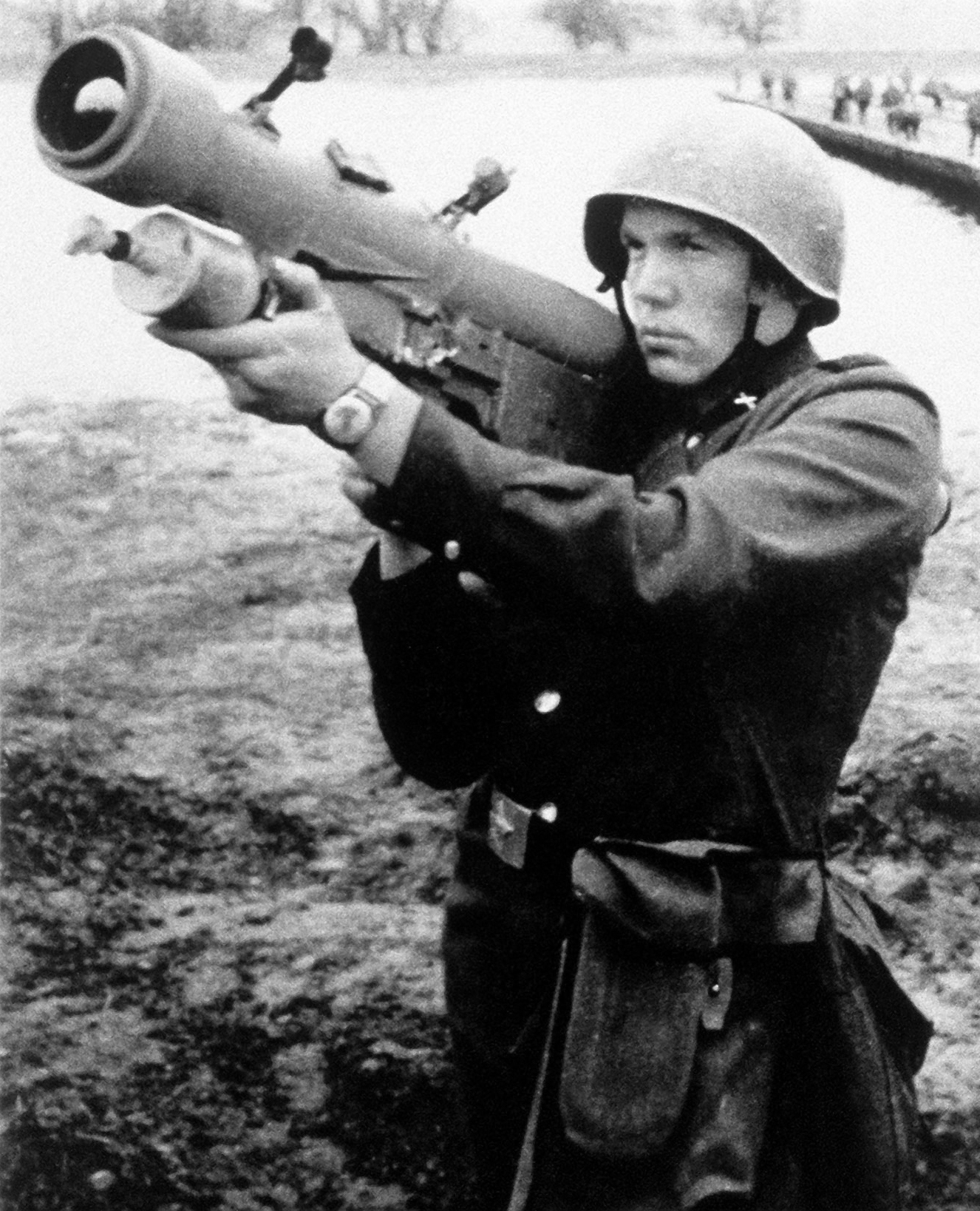
Strela-2 was designed under the lead of Nepobedimy in 1968

He was the principal designer of:

- anti-tank systems «Shmel» (1960), «Malyutka» (1963) and later, the semi-automatic «Malyutka-P» (1969);
- «Strela-2» (1968), «Strela-2M» (1970), «Strela-3» (1974), «Igla-1» (1981), «Igla» (1983);
- supersonic anti-tank guided rocket system «Sturm» - «Sturm-B» for the helicopters (1976) and «Sturm-C» for the vehicles (1978); «Ataka» (seriously modernized «Sturm») and first double-channeled Khrizantema.
- tactical rocket complexes TRK "Tochka" - with SBCh, OFBCh (1975), with KBCh (1977), with G (1979), with F-R (1982) and Tochka-U (1988), operative-tactical rocket complex OTRK "Oka" (1980).
- active armored vehicle defence system KAZ "Arena"

Besides, he initiated the design work on Iskander missiles, which was begun in December 1988.

In 1989, after the INF Treaty that eliminated all Soviet OTRK "Oka" (though formally they were not mentioned in the treaty), Nepobedimy stepped down as Chief Designer and retired from KBM. From 1990 until his death he worked in the Moscow Central Scientific Research Institute of Automatics and Hydraulics ad as the Chief of the scientific and technical center "REAGENT". He was the author of more than 350 scientific works, patents and one discovery.

Sergey Nepobedimy died in Kolomna in April 2014 and was buried at the Federal Military Memorial Cemetery.
