= Shmel =

Shmel may refer to:

- RPO-A Shmel (Bumblebee), rocket flamethrower
- 3M6 Shmel, guided anti-tank missile
- Beriev A-50 Shmel airborne early warning (AEW) aircraft, or its Russian radar
