= AT-6 =

AT-6 may refer to:

- AT-6 Spiral, the NATO reporting name for an anti-tank missile system of the Soviet Union
- T-6 Texan, a WWII-era training aircraft used by numerous air forces
- AT-6B Wolverine, Armed version of the Beechcraft T-6 Texan II training aircraft for primary weapons training or light attack roles
