= 9M17 Fleyta =

3M11 / 9M17 AT-2 Swatter
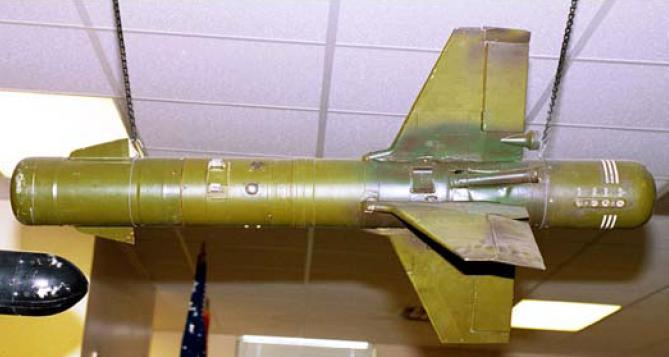
- 3M11 Fleyta
- Type: Anti-tank missile
- Place of origin: Soviet Union

Service history
- In service: 1964-present

Production history
- Designer: Nudelman OKB-16

Specifications
- Mass: 27 kilograms (60 lb)
- Length: 1,160 mm (46 in)
- Diameter: 148 mm (5.8 in)
- Wingspan: 680 mm (27 in)
- Warhead: HEAT
- Warhead weight: 5.4 kg (12 lb)
- Engine: Solid fuel rocket
- Operational range: 0.5 to 2.5 kilometres (0.31 to 1.55 mi)
- Maximum speed: 160 m/s (360 mph)
- Guidance system: Radio command
- Steering system: MCLOS
- Launch platform: Mi-4, Mi-8, Mi-24, Mi-25, BRDM-1, BRDM-2

The 3M11 Fleyta (flute, NATO reporting name AT-2 Swatter) is a Soviet MCLOS radio command anti-tank missile. Various improved versions were designated 9M17 Falanga.

== Development ==
The missile was developed by the Nudelman OKB-16 design bureau. It was developed at about the same time as the 3M6 Shmel as a heavy ATGM for use on both ground launchers and helicopters. It addressed some of the problems of the 3M6; it was much faster, and had slightly longer range. These improvements were achieved by sending commands via a radio link instead of a trailing guidance wire, which allowed the missile to travel faster. However, it did make it vulnerable to jamming. The missile system was shown to Soviet premier Nikita Khrushchev in September 1964, and accepted for service shortly afterwards.

== History ==
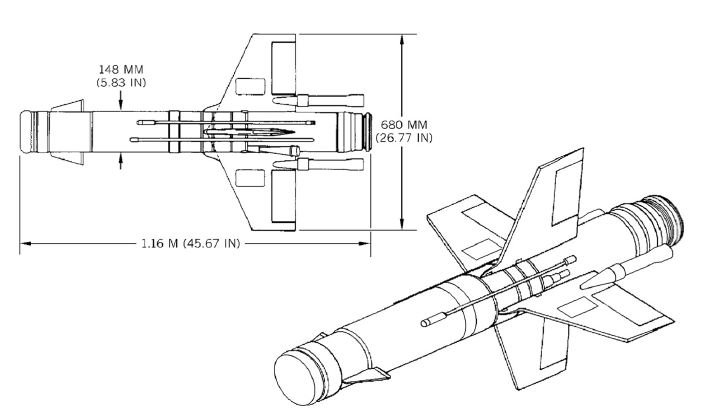
9M17 Falanga missile

The 3M11 was the first Soviet ATGM to be deployed from helicopters. Small numbers were fitted to the Mi-4AV. The missile was deployed on the Mil Mi-8 as well as the Mi-24 and Mi-25 series of helicopters. It was also deployed on the BRDM-1 and BRDM-2 infantry fighting vehicles.

The 3M11 Fleyta was problematic; one Russian source describes the missile as "notable for its complexity and low reliability". Also, the missile's range was felt to be inadequate. An improved version of the missile was developed: the 9M17 Falanga (NATO reporting name AT-2B). Externally, the missiles are very similar, however the 9M17 range is increased to 3.5 km. The standard production version was the 9M17M Falanga-M, which entered service in 1968.

The next development was to integrate SACLOS guidance, resulting in the 9M17P Falanga-P (NATO reporting name AT-2 Swatter-C). It entered service in 1969. A product improved version the 9M17MP was developed that had an improved engine and signal lamp.

The missile has been used extensively in the following wars on the Mi-24 platform.

- Angolan War of Independence
- Soviet invasion of Afghanistan
- 1980s Iran–Iraq War
- 1982 Lebanon War
- 1973s Israel and Egypt War 6 October

It was replaced in Soviet service by the 9K114 Shturm ATGM.

== General characteristics (3M11 Fleyta) ==
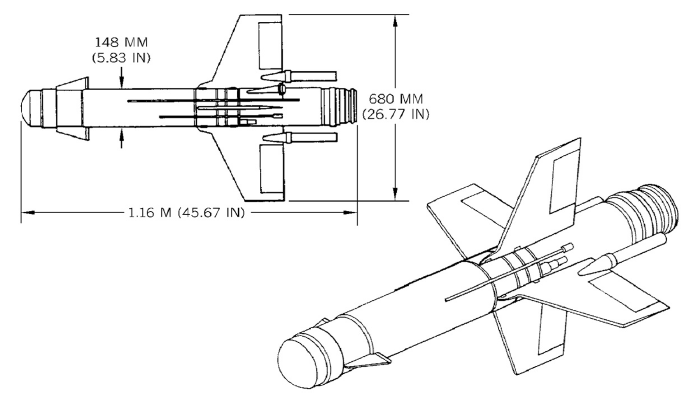
3M11 Fleyta missile

- Length: 1,160 mm
- Wingspan: 680 mm
- Diameter: 148 mm
- Launch weight: 27.0 kg
- Speed: 150–170 m/s
- Range: 500 m - 2.5 km
- Time to maximum range: 17 seconds
- Guidance: Radio command MCLOS
- Warhead: 5.4 kg HEAT 500 mm vs RHA；maximum 650 mm vs RHA for improved variant.

== Models ==
- 3M11 Fleyta MCLOS (NATO reporting name AT-2A Swatter A)
- 9M17 Falanga (NATO reporting name AT-2B Swatter B): Range increased to 3.5 km.
  - 9M17DB Modified system to work with the Mi-8TB
- 9M17M Falanga-M MCLOS: Launch weight 29 kg (64 lb), maximum range 3,500 m. First seen in the 1973 Moscow Parade.
- 9M17P Falanga-P (NATO reporting name AT-2C Swatter C): First SACLOS version.. Launch weight 29 kg.
  - 9M17MP Improved engine and guidance lamp. Maximum range 4,000 m.
  - 9M17N

== Operators ==
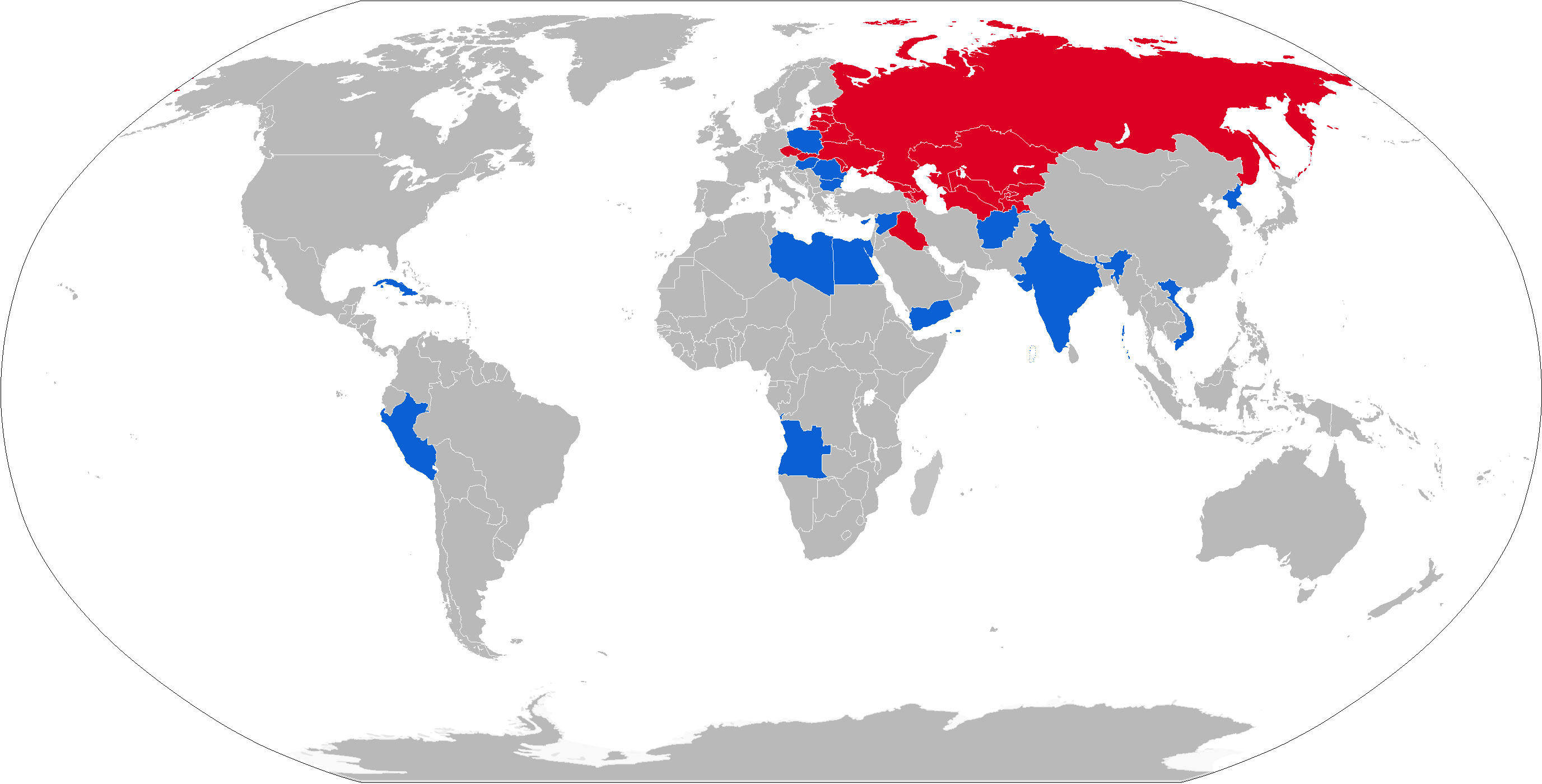
Operators: Current Former

=== Current operators ===
- Angola - 9M17M Falanga-M.
- Hungary - 3M11 Falanga.
- Nicaragua - 9M17 Skorpion.

=== Former operators ===
- Afghanistan - Used on Mi-24A attack helicopters.
- Bulgaria
- Czechoslovakia - passed on to successor states.
- Czech Republic
- East Germany – Used on Mi-24D, and subsequently passed on to the unified German state, and retired soon after.
- Egypt
- Iraq - Used on Mi-24. Out of use since the 2003 invasion of Iraq.
- Libyan Arab Jamahiriya - Mounted on helicopters.
- Peru - Used on Mi-24D helicopters.
- Poland - only used on Mi-24D, withdrawn from service.
- Russia - Missiles using as targets for training.
- Romania
- Slovakia
- Soviet Union - passed on to successor states.
- South Yemen - Passed on to the unified Republic of Yemen.
- Syria
- Yemen

== Sources ==
- Hull, A.W.; Markov, D.R.; Zaloga, S.J. (1999). Soviet/Russian Armor and Artillery Design Practices 1945 to Present. Darlington Productions. ISBN 1-892848-01-5.
