= BRDM-1 =

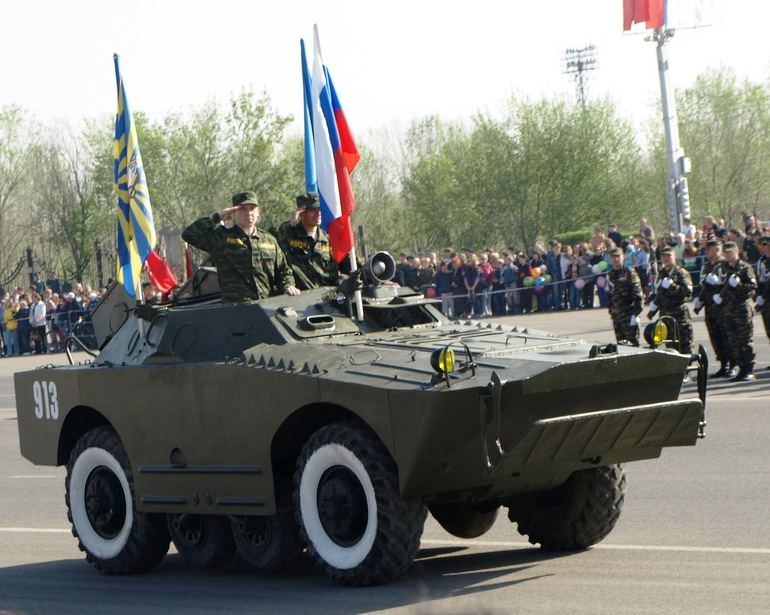
- BRDM-1 in Russian service, 2010
- Type: Amphibious armored scout car
- Place of origin: Soviet Union

Service history
- In service: 1957–1970s (USSR)
- Used by: See Operators

Production history
- Designer: V. K. Rubtsov
- Designed: late 1954 – 1957
- Produced: 1957–1966
- No. built: 11,500
- Variants: See Variants

Specifications
- Mass: 5.63 tonnes
- Length: 5.7 m (18 ft 8 in)
- Width: 2.25 m (7 ft 5 in)
- Height: 2.9 m (9 ft 6 in)
- Crew: 3–4 (Note: Driver, co-driver and commander for BRDM-1 obr. 1957 and BRDM-1 obr. 1958. Driver, co-driver, commander, and gunner for BRDM-1 obr. 1959, BRDM-1 obr. 1960 and late BRDM-1)
- Armor: Welded steel 10 mm maximum
- Main armament: none (BRDM-1 obr. 1957 and BRDM-1 obr. 1958); 7.62 mm SGMB medium machine gun on the front pintel mount (BRDM-1 obr. 1959 and BRDM-1 obr. 1960); 12.7 mm DShK 1938/46 heavy machine gun or 14.5 mm KPV heavy machine gun (Late BRDM-1)
- Secondary armament: none (BRDM-1 obr. 1957, BRDM-1 obr. 1958 and BRDM-1 obr. 1959); 2 × 7.62 mm SGMB medium machine guns on the side pintel mounts (optional) (BRDM-1 obr. 1960); 3 × 7.62 mm SGMB medium machine guns on pintel mounts (two optional) (Late BRDM-1)
- Engine: GAZ-40PB 6-cylinder in-line gasoline 90 hp (70 kW) at 3,400 rpm.
- Power/weight: 16 hp/tonne (12.4 kW/tonne)
- Suspension: Leaf springs with hydraulic shock absorbers
- Ground clearance: 340 mm
- Fuel capacity: 150 litres
- Operational range: Road: 750 km (470 mi); Water: 120 km (75 mi)
- Maximum speed: Road: 90 km/h (56 mph); Water: 9 km/h (5.6 mph)

The BRDM-1 (Russian: Бронированная Разведывательная Дозорная Машина, romanized: Bronirovannaya Razvedyvatelnaya Dozornaya Mashina, lit. 'armored reconnaissance/patrol vehicle') is a Soviet amphibious armored scout car. It was the first purpose-built Soviet reconnaissance vehicle to enter service since the BA-64 and was built on the chassis and drive train of the BTR-40 armored personnel carrier. It is the world's first mass-produced combat vehicle of its class.

The primary advantage of the BRDM-1 at the time of its introduction was its amphibious capability, which was the main shortcoming associated with its BTR-40 counterpart. Another unique feature of the vehicle's design were two pairs of chain-driven auxiliary wheels, which could be lowered to provide additional traction on muddy terrain. The BRDM-1 was manufactured from 1957 to 1966, at which time 10,000 had entered service with the Soviet Union and its military allies around the world. It was thereafter superseded by the improved BRDM-2, which possessed greater amphibious capabilities, a more powerful engine, and a fully enclosed turret.

== Development history ==
During World War II and the immediate postwar period, the Soviet Union and a number of countries embraced the concept of purpose-built armored scout cars designed to provide protection and moderate fighting capability to reconnaissance units. A few nations, such as the United States, rejected the same concept because they found armored reconnaissance vehicles to be counterproductive in reducing situational awareness and encouraging their crews to emulate tank tactics. Others, such as France, explicitly adopted heavily armed and armored reconnaissance vehicles because their respective doctrines encouraged aggressive reconnaissance. The Soviet scout cars, by contrast, were lightly armed and armored, making them effective in the role of passive reconnaissance while still providing protection under cover for the crew. They were still capable of undertaking more aggressive forms of reconnaissance when deployed in concert with more heavily armed combat vehicles.

Throughout the postwar era, the Soviet Army had initially used the BA-64 in the scout car role; however, the growing obsolescence of that design led to its replacement by the BTR-40, which was designed as a general purpose transporter and armored car. Soviet dissatisfaction with the BTR-40 in the scout car role led to design work being initiated on a new purpose-built scout car in 1954. The Soviet Army specified an amphibious armored vehicle able to accommodate a crew of five, with a road speed of around 80 kilometres per hour and a road range of at least 500 kilometres. In 1956, the Dedkov OKB Design Bureau produced a prototype which utilized the automotive and chassis components of the BTR-40 but incorporated an entirely new, boat-shaped hull with amphibious capability. A number of modifications also had to be made to the engine placement, gearbox, transmission, and axles of the original BTR-40 design to accommodate the new hull. This received the designation BTR-40P and was first trialed by the Soviet Army in the Black Sea that year. The vehicle was accepted for service in 1957 as the Boyevaya Razvedyvatelnaya Dozornaya Mashina (BRDM).

== Service history ==
In Soviet service, the new BRDMs were attached on the divisional level and deployed for screening and long-range probing actions. During the 1960s and 1970s, the scout cars were complemented in Soviet reconnaissance battalions by specialized variants of the BMP-1 infantry fighting vehicles, which were able to reconnoiter much more aggressively and engage hostile armor as needed. About 10,000 BRDMs were built for the Soviet Army and another 1,500 for export, primarily to East Germany, where it received the designation SPW-40P, and the People's Republic of Poland. The vehicle was criticised for its light armour and the vulnerability of its front-mounted engine compartment during combat, as well as its open top, which exposed the crew to enemy fire when operating the weapons systems. This was partly rectified by the introduction of an improved variant in 1958, which had a hermetically sealed fighting compartment and an overpressure system, reducing the threats from fragments and allowing the crew to reconnoiter contaminated environments. However, it remained impossible to operate the vehicle's weapons system from within the hull. This and other shortcomings prompted Soviet engineers to begin work on a new model of the BRDM capable of carrying the same turret as the BTR-60 armored personnel carrier. The latest mark had the engine compartment shifted to the rear and was considerably more mobile; it entered service as the BRDM-2 during the mid-1960s. The earlier BRDM design was redesignated BRDM-1 in Soviet service and remained in use until the late 1970s, when it was retired.

The Soviet Army exported many second-hand BRDM-1s to its military allies, particularly in Africa, from 1966 to 1980. Both Egypt and Syria deployed BRDM-1s during the Six-Day War; a number of these vehicles were captured by the Israel Defense Forces (IDF) during that conflict and subsequently reused in unconventional operations. Egyptian and Syrian BRDM-1s were deployed again during the Yom Kippur War, albeit in smaller numbers, having been largely superseded by the more modern BRDM-2. Several captured Egyptian or Syrian BRDM-1s were transferred to the United States for evaluation purposes during the late 1970s by the Israeli government. The Armed Forces for the Liberation of Angola (FAPLA) deployed a number of BRDM-1s during the Angolan Civil War. Ugandan BRDM-1s were deployed against Tanzanian forces in Kampala during the Uganda–Tanzania War.

By 2000, the BRDM-1 only remained in service with the armies of eleven nations and was almost wholly confined to reserve storage. In 2016, less than 200 BRDM-1s were believed to remain in service worldwide.

== Description ==
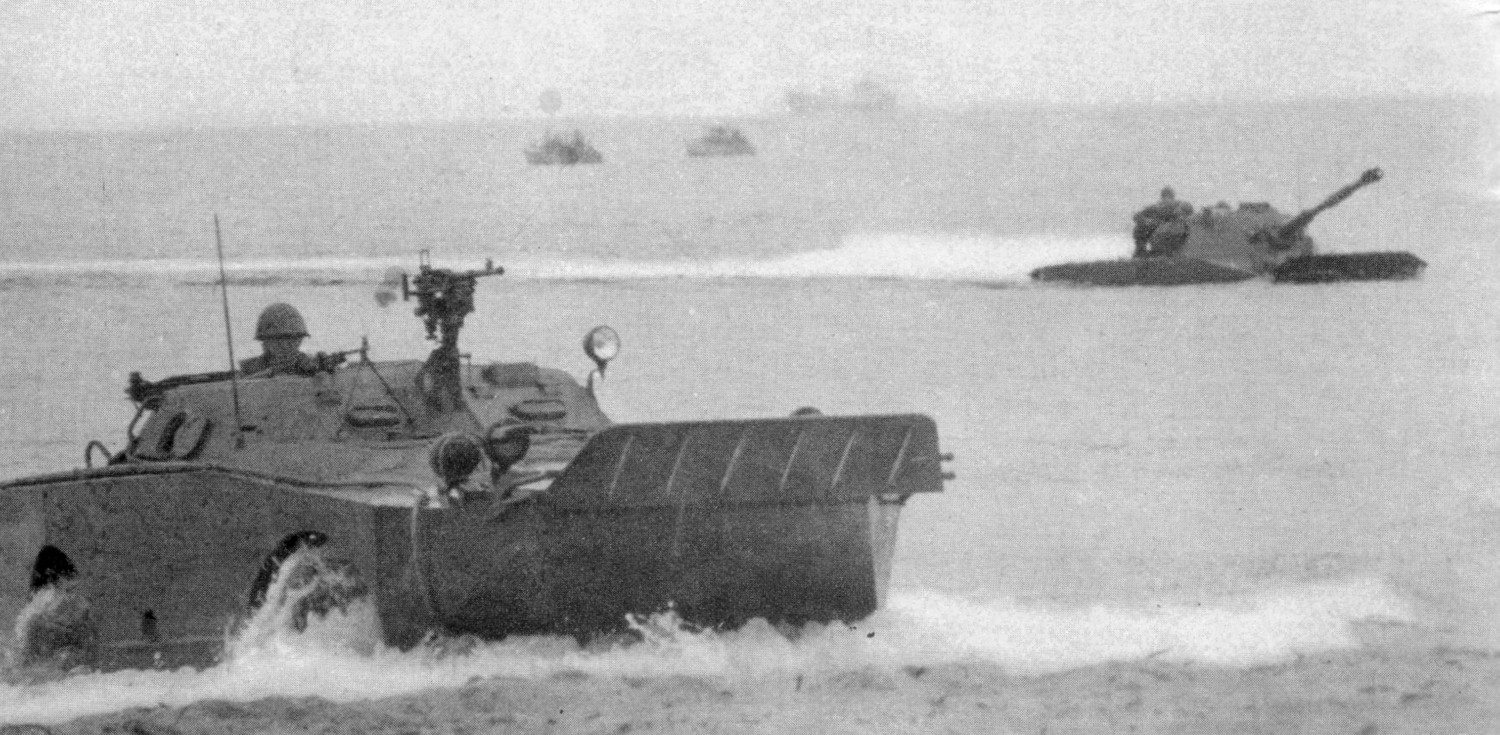
A swimming Polish BRDM-1 and PT-76 light tank during an amphibious exercise. Notice the raised trim board in the front of the vehicle.

The vehicle's most unusual feature is the four additional chain-driven belly wheels, which are lowered by the driver to allow trench crossing. The vehicle also has a tire pressure regulation system which later became standard in Soviet wheeled military vehicles. The initial version of the vehicle, the BRDM obr. 1957, had an open roof, but the next production model, the BRDM obr. 1958, added a roof with twin hatches over commander's and driver's station and two hatches at the rear.

The vehicle is a conventional 4×4 design, with a welded steel chassis, an engine at the front and crew compartment at the rear. The driver sits on the left, with the commander to his right. The vehicle is not fitted with an NBC system, and has no night-vision equipment by default. The vehicle has four infra-red driving lights and a single white light searchlight is mounted on the driver's side of the vehicle. When in combat BRDM-1's front windscreens are protected by armoured shutters with integral vision blocks. When the shutters are in their open position they protect driver and commander from being blinded by the sunlight and ensure that the windscreens won't be obscured by rain or snow. The GAZ-40PB 6-cylinder gasoline engine is the same engine as the one used in the BTR-40, being based on the GAZ-12 ZIM luxury car unit, and is coupled to a manual gearbox with four forward gears and one reverse with a single dry-plate clutch. The four additional belly wheels which can be lowered to improve the vehicles cross-country performance by reducing its ground pressure, and to allow it to cross trenches up to 1.2 meters wide. Tire pressure in the main tires can also be raised and lowered by the driver for better performance.

The vehicle is fully amphibious, a trim board is raised at the front of the vehicle before entering the water to improve vehicle's stability and displacement in water and prevent the water from flooding the bow. In the water the vehicle is propelled by a single rear-mounted water-jet. The water jet is powered by the main engine which drives a four-bladed propeller. The water jet outlet is protected by an armoured shutter while on land. This shutter must be removed before entering water. While the trim board in the front is in its travelling position it serves as additional armour.

The BRDM-1 has a maximum armour thickness of 10 mm. This is sufficient for protection against small arms fire and small shell fragments but not against larger artillery fragments and 0.50 in (13 mm) machine gun fire. The BRDM-1-series tires are unarmoured and are particularly vulnerable to puncture from fire of all kinds.

The BRDM obr. 1959 was normally armed with a single 7.62 mm SGMB medium machine gun mounted at the front of the hull for which 1,250 rounds of ammunition were carried. The BRDM-2 obr. 1960 also had mountings for two more 7.62 mm SGMB medium machine guns on the sides of the roof however usually only one machine gun was mounted even though it was possible to mount machine guns in all three mounting points. Later the 12.7 mm DShK 1938/46 heavy machine gun or 14.5 mm KPV heavy machine gun replaced the 7.62 mm SGMB medium machine gun in the front while an additional 7.62 mm SGMB medium machine gun was mounted on the rear. It was still possible to mount the other two 7.62 mm SGMB medium machine guns on the sides of the vehicle.

The Soviet Army however disliked the vehicle for several reasons. The vehicle had no turret and to operate the armament the gunner had to open a hatch and expose himself to enemy fire. The vehicle also didn't have any kind of special sights which undermined its usability as a reconnaissance vehicle. These perceived shortcomings were noted and addressed by Soviet engineers in the design of the BRDM-2.

== Variants ==
=== East Germany ===
- SPW-40P – East German designator for unarmed BRDM-1.
- SPW-40PA – East German version of armed BRDM-1 with larger IR headlights.
- 9P111 – East German version of the 9P110. Unlike the Soviet 9P110 the East German variant has additional protection for headlights and two mounts for fuel canisters in the rear of the vehicle.

=== Hungarian People's Republic ===
- FUG – FÚG (Felderítő Úszó Gépkocsi - "amphibious reconnaissance vehicle") – Due to the similarities with BRDM-1, the D-442 FUG is sometimes mistaken for a BRDM-1 modification, though several important differences reflect an independence of the design. It has two waterjets for amphibious propulsion instead of one as in BRDM-1, powered by a Hungarian-made Csepel six-cylinder diesel engine, and the engine compartment is in the rear. It was produced by Hungary at Rába Magyar Vagon és Gépgyár and used by Hungary, Poland, and Czechoslovakia. It is also known as D-442.

=== USSR ===
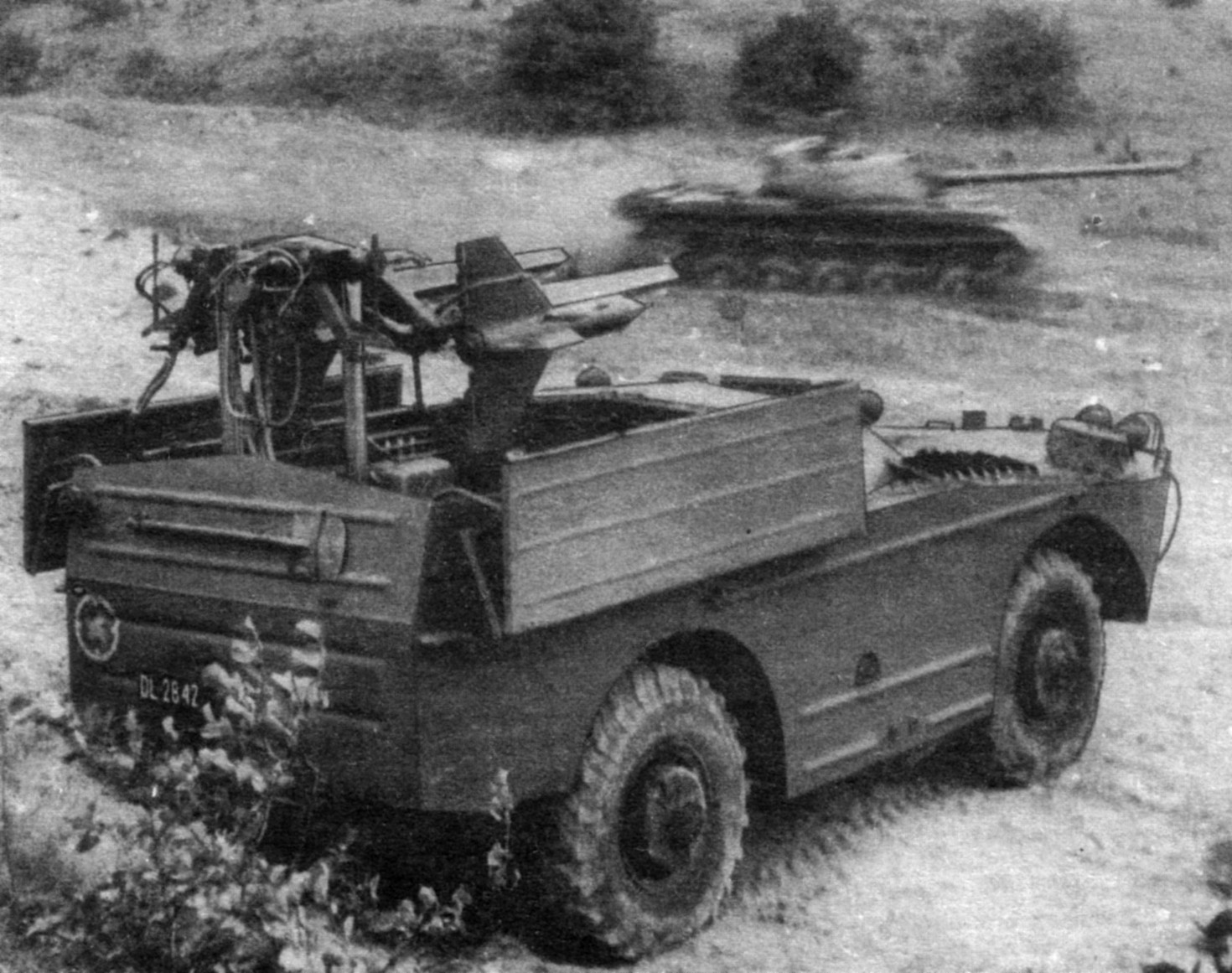
Polish 2P27 tank destroyer armed with 3M6 Shmel guided missiles.

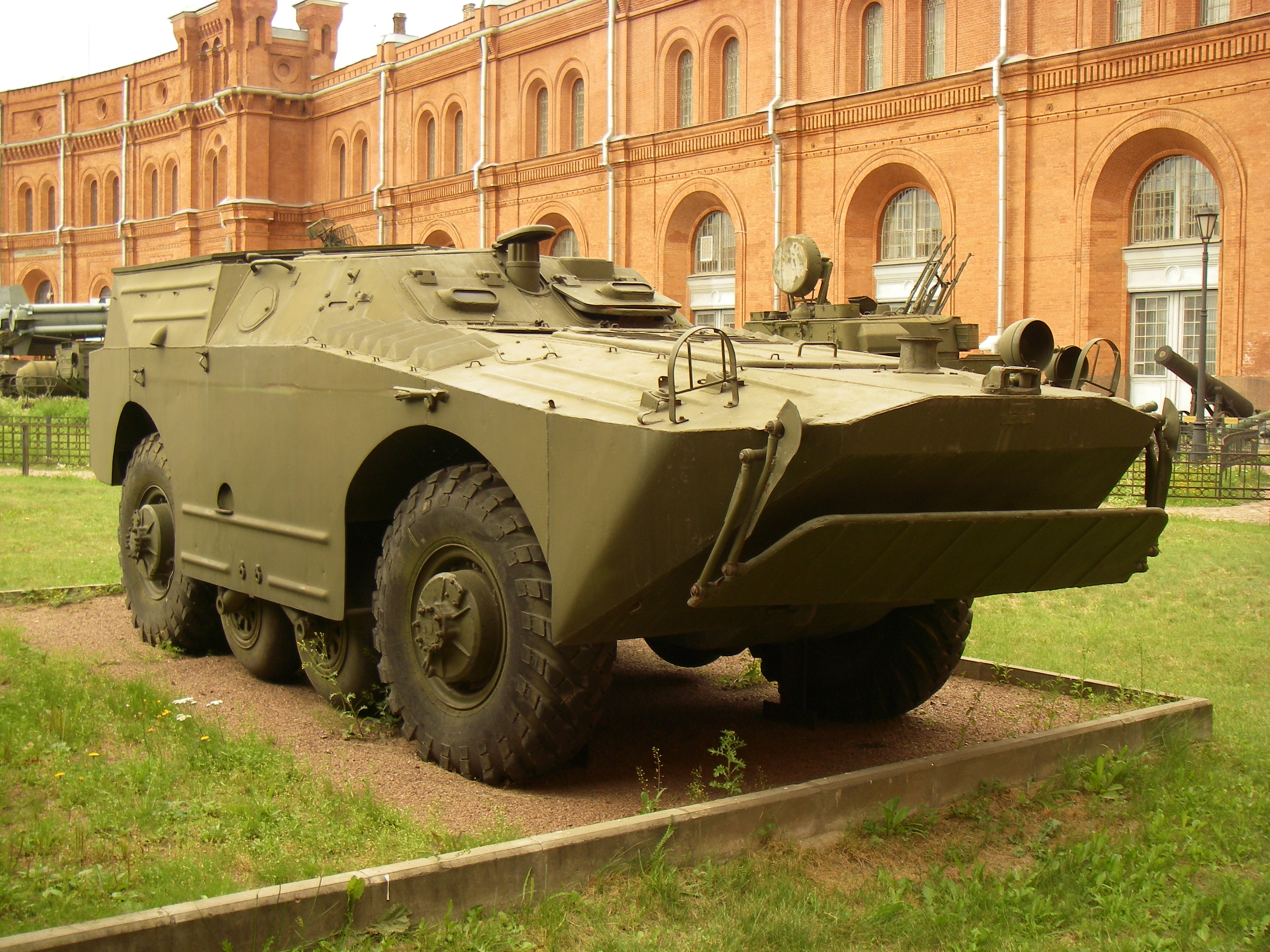
9P110 tank destroyer in Saint Petersburg Artillery Museum

- BRDM-1 obr. 1957 – standard unarmed amphibious armoured scout car with an opened top. It was also known under designation BTR-40P.
  - BRDM-1 obr. 1958 – standard unarmed amphibious armoured scout car fitted with a roof with two hatches at the front. It was also known under designation BTR-40P.
    - BRDM-1 obr. 1959 – standard amphibious armoured scout car fitted with one 7.62 mm medium machine gun pintle mount at the front of the roof. It was also known under designation BTR-40P.
      - BRDM-1 obr. 1960 – standard amphibious armoured scout car fitted with three 7.62 mm medium machine guns pintle mounts: one at the front of the roof and one on each side of the superstructure. It was possible to mount machine guns at all three mounting positions at the same time but it was rarely practiced. It was also known under designation BTR-40P.
        - BRDM-2 – Further development of BRDM-1.
- BRDM-RKh – NBC reconnaissance vehicle with two KZO-2 flag dispensers and with several detection devices including the DP dosimeter and PCHR-54 semi-automatic detection device. It was also known under designation BTR-40P-Rkh.
- BRDM-1U – Command vehicle with additional R-112 radios and 3 whip antennas. It was also known under designations BTR-40PU and BRDM-u.
  - BRDM-1U modified for use by transport units. This variant has a rear traffic light.
- 2P27 – Tank destroyer equipped with 2K16 launcher for 3×3M6 "Shmel" (AT-1 Snapper) ATGM. The rear of the vehicle has been completely rebuilt. The space for the reconnaissance team and the reconnaissance equipment is replaced by a superstructure in which a launcher with three 3M6 "Shmel" missiles is carried. While on the move the launcher is hidden inside of the superstructure and is protected by its armour. Thanks to this when the launcher is not deployed the 2P27 looks almost exactly as a normal BRDM-1. It even still has four firing ports on both sides of the vehicle even though it is impossible to operate them in this vehicle. It is almost impossible to distinguish the two vehicles from a long distance. When the vehicle stops the rocket launcher can be deployed. This is done by taking off two the steel panels on top of the launcher's compartment, opening a flap in the rear of the superstructure and elevating the launcher. After that the launcher can be immediately fired. Developed in 1958.
- 2P32 – Tank destroyer equipped with 2K8 launcher for 4×9M11 "Falanga" (AT-2 Swatter) ATGM. The vehicle is exactly the same as the 2P27 but has a different missile launcher which uses four 9M11 "Falanga". It is a logical successor to the 2P27, entered service in 1962.
- 9P110 – Tank destroyer equipped with 9К14М launcher for 6×9M14 "Malyutka" (AT-3 Sagger) ATGM. Production started in 1963. This vehicle, just like 2P27 and 2P32, has superstructure in the rear where the missile launcher is hidden. However, as the launcher's compartment is smaller the vehicle retains the characteristic rear of the BRDM-1. The mechanism of deploying the launcher was also simplified. Now it is just a matter of finding a suitable site and elevating the launcher. One of the visually distinguishing features between this tank destroyer from 2P27 and 2P32 after the launcher has been deployed is the fact that the latter ones don't have the overhead protection for the launcher once it's in firing position.

== Operators ==
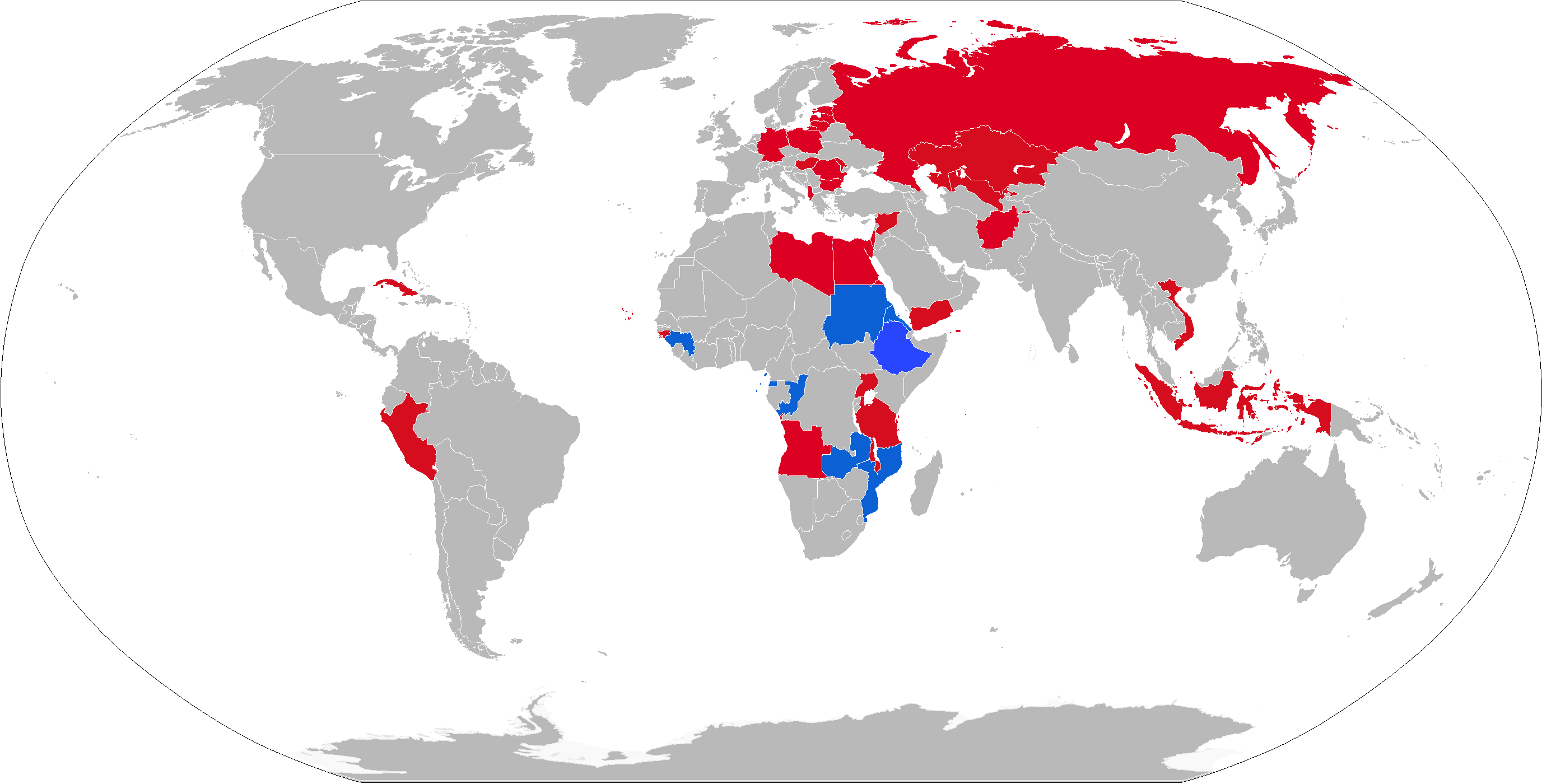
Map of BRDM-1 operators Current Former

- Republic of the Congo
- Cuba: 50
- Eritrea
- Ethiopia
- Guinea: 10
- Mozambique: 51; >28 operational in 2013.
- Sudan: 5
- Transnistria
- Vietnam: 50
- Zambia: 44

=== Former operators ===
- Afghanistan: 50
- People's Socialist Republic of Albania: 15
- People's Republic of Angola
- People's Republic of Bulgaria: 150
- Czechoslovakia: 124
- East Germany: 299
- Egypt: 200
- Indonesia
- Israel
- Kazakhstan
- Libya: 60
- Oman
- Peru: 12
- Polish People's Republic : 900
- Socialist Republic of Romania
- Soviet Union: 10,000
- Ba'athist Syria: 100, retired before the 2010s
- Tanzania: 30
- Uganda: 98

== See also ==
- BRDM
- BRDM-2
- D-442 FÚG
