= 9M123 Khrizantema =

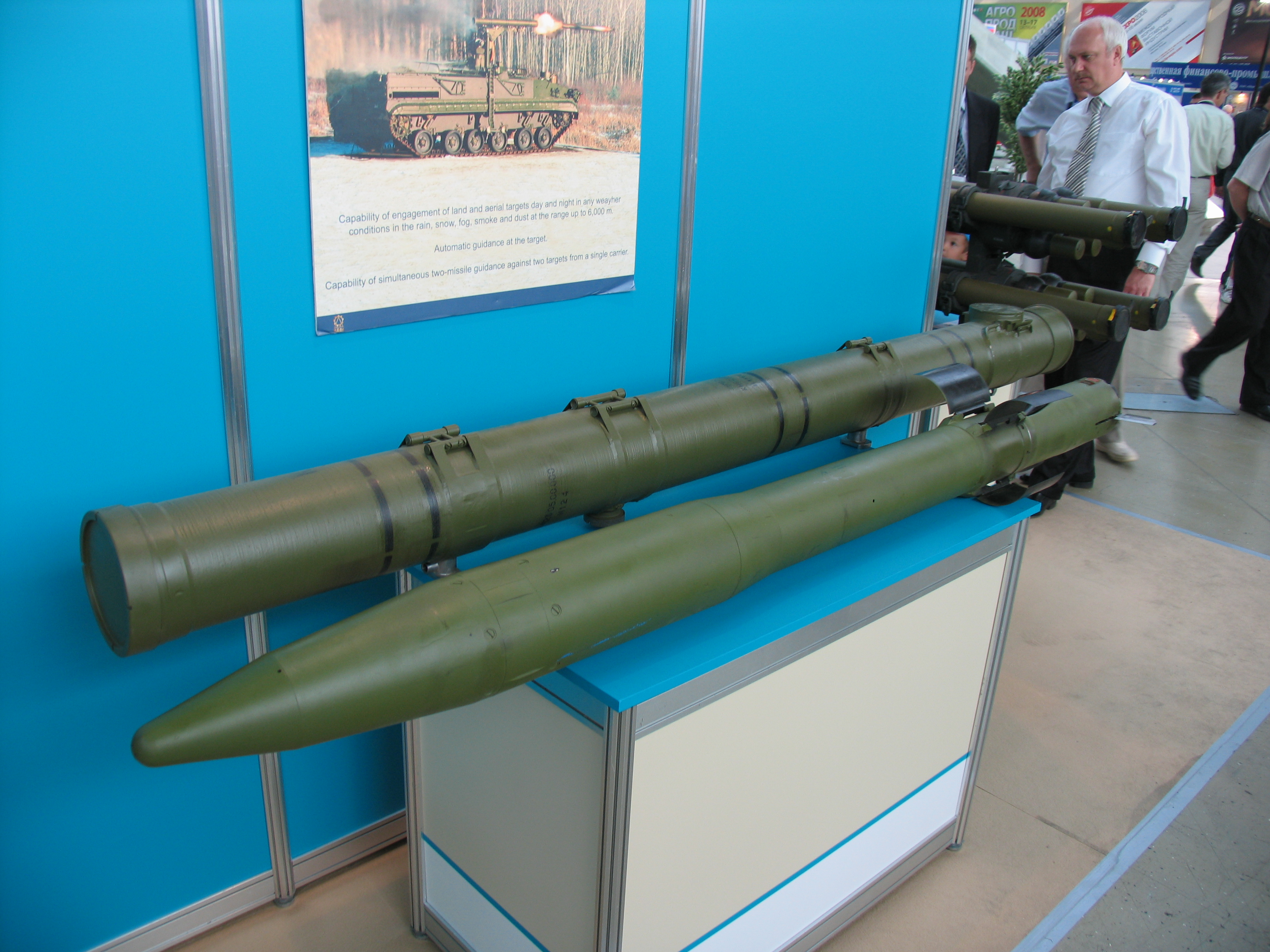
- The 9M123 missile
- Type: Anti-tank guided missile
- Place of origin: Russia

Service history
- In service: 2005–present
- Used by: Russia
- Wars: Libyan civil war (2011)

Production history
- Designer: KBM (Kolomna)
- Designed: 1996; 30 years ago
- Manufacturer: KBMN
- Produced: 2005-present
- Variants: 9M123, 9M123-2, 9M123F, 9M123F-2

Specifications (9M123)
- Mass: 46 kg (101 lb) (54 kg (119 lb) with launch tube)
- Length: 2,357 mm (7.733 ft)
- Diameter: 150 mm (5.9 in)
- Wingspan: 310 mm (12 in)
- Warhead: Tandem-charge HEAT (9M123), thermobaric (9M123F)
- Warhead weight: 8 kg (18 lb) (9M123); 6 kg (13 lb) (9M123F)
- Detonation mechanism: Impact fuze
- Propellant: Solid-fuel rocket
- Operational range: 400-6,000 m (3.7 mi)
- Maximum speed: 400 m/s (Mach 1.2)
- Guidance system: ACLOS radar beam riding, SACLOS laser beam riding
- Steering system: Two control surfaces
- Accuracy: <5 m
- Launch platform: 9P157-2 tank destroyer (based on BMP-3 chassis), Mil Mi-28, Ka-52 Alligator

The 9M123 Khrizantema (Russian: "Хризантема"; English: Chrysanthemum, NATO reporting name AT-15 Springer) is a Russian anti-tank guided missile (ATGM). Khrizantema was designed to deal with current and future generations of main battle tanks and can also be used to engage slow and low flying aerial targets like helicopters. The 9M123 missile, and its associated guidance system, forms the 9K123 missile system.

== Development ==
The Khrizantema anti-tank missile was unveiled in July 1996 by the Konstruktorskoye Byuro Mashynostroyenia (KB Mashinostroyeniya – KBM) Engineering Design Bureau. The missile began development in the 1980s and was designed as an all weather, multi-purpose missile system that could defeat current and future armoured units equipped with advanced armour protection, such as explosive reactive armour (ERA). Khrizantema was envisaged as a replacement for a variety of different types of anti-tank missiles that remained in service with the Russian military, such as the 9K114 Shturm and the 9M120 Ataka-V. The system entered service with the Russian Armed Forces in 2005.

== Description ==
The 9M123 missile is supersonic, flying at an average speed of 400 metres per second (1,300 ft/s) or Mach 1.2 and has a range of between 400 and 6,000 meters. Propulsion is achieved via one solid fuel rocket motor with two exhausts on either side of the missile. The offset exhausts spin the missile during flight. Guidance control is provided by two pop-out control surfaces at the rear of the missile. Four added surfaces, just in front of the controls, help stabilize the missile in flight. The Khrizantema is unique among Russian anti-tank guided missiles as, depending on the variant of the missile, it can be guided by either laser or radar. The radar unit uses the millimeter wave band and the system automatically tracks the target and guides the missile in the radar beam; this form of guidance is line of sight beam riding (LOSBR) that is automatic command to line of sight (ACLOS). When guided using a laser, a continuous laser beam is generated towards the target and a sensor in the rear section enables the missile to ride the laser beam to the target; this form of guidance is LOSBR that is semi-automatic command to line of sight (SACLOS). This dual guidance system allows two missiles to be fired at two separate targets at once, with one missile guided by laser and the other by radar. Each missile carries a tandem-charge high-explosive anti-tank (HEAT) warhead with a reported penetration of 1100–1250 mm rolled homogeneous armour (RHA) behind ERA. Alternatively, a thermobaric warhead can be carried to engage soft-skinned targets, fortifications and manpower.

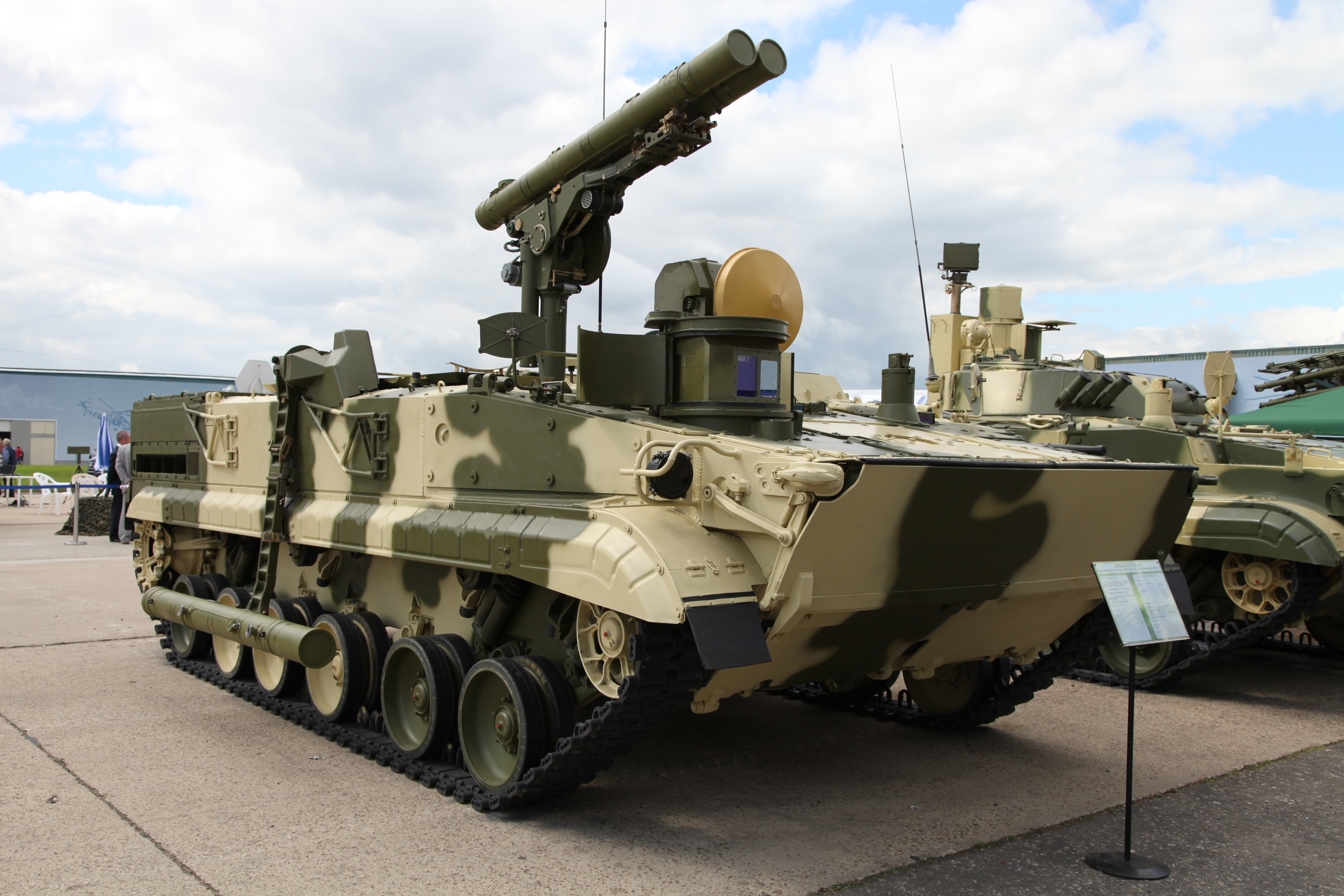
9P157-2 "Khrizantema-S" variant of the BMP-3 infantry fighting vehicle

It is currently launched from the 9P157-2 Khrizantema-S tank destroyer, Mi-28 Havoc attack helicopter, and from the Ka-52 Alligator attack helicopter with a 10km range. The 9P157-2 Khrizantema-S is based on the BMP-3 chassis. The 9P157-2 carries two 9M123 missiles on launch rails, which are capable of -85° / 85° Horizontal guidance and -12° / 15° Vertical guidance to ensure engagement capability on rough terrain, the launch rails are extended from a stowed position, the radar is also stowed during transit. Missiles are re-loaded automatically within 15 seconds by the tank destroyer from an internal magazine with 15 rounds (missiles are stored and transported in sealed canisters) and can also accept munitions manually loaded from outside the vehicle. The manufacturer claims that three 9P157-2 tank destroyers are able to engage 14 attacking tanks and destroy at least sixty percent of the attacking force. The dual guidance system ensures protection against electronic countermeasures and operation in all climatic conditions, day or night. NBC protection is provided for the crew (gunner and driver) of each 9P157-2 in addition to full armour protection equivalent to the standard BMP-3 chassis and entrenching equipment. The Khrizantema-S's mobility is almost the same as the BMP-3s, as they both share the same UTD-29 engine, transmission and suspension. Both vehicles share a top speed of 70 km/h, but the Khrizantema-S's extra 300 kg weight results in a slightly slower acceleration.

Trials of a modernized version completed in 2016. On the upgraded version were installed an IIR/TV sight with a laser rangefinder, a modified radar control system, an increased secrecy laser beam-riding channel, an automated battle management equipment set and a more powerful warhead for the 9M123 missile among others.

== Variants ==
- 9M123 – Laser guidance with tandem HEAT warhead
- 9M123-2 – Radar guidance with tandem HEAT warhead
- 9M123F – Laser guidance with thermobaric warhead
- 9M123F-2 – Radar guidance with thermobaric warhead
- 9M123 Khrizantema-M – Upgraded version with extended range and combination of millimeter-wave radar ACLOS along with laser beam riding guidance
- 9M123 Khrizantema-VM – Air to surface version for helicopters, with full features from 9M123M

== Operators ==
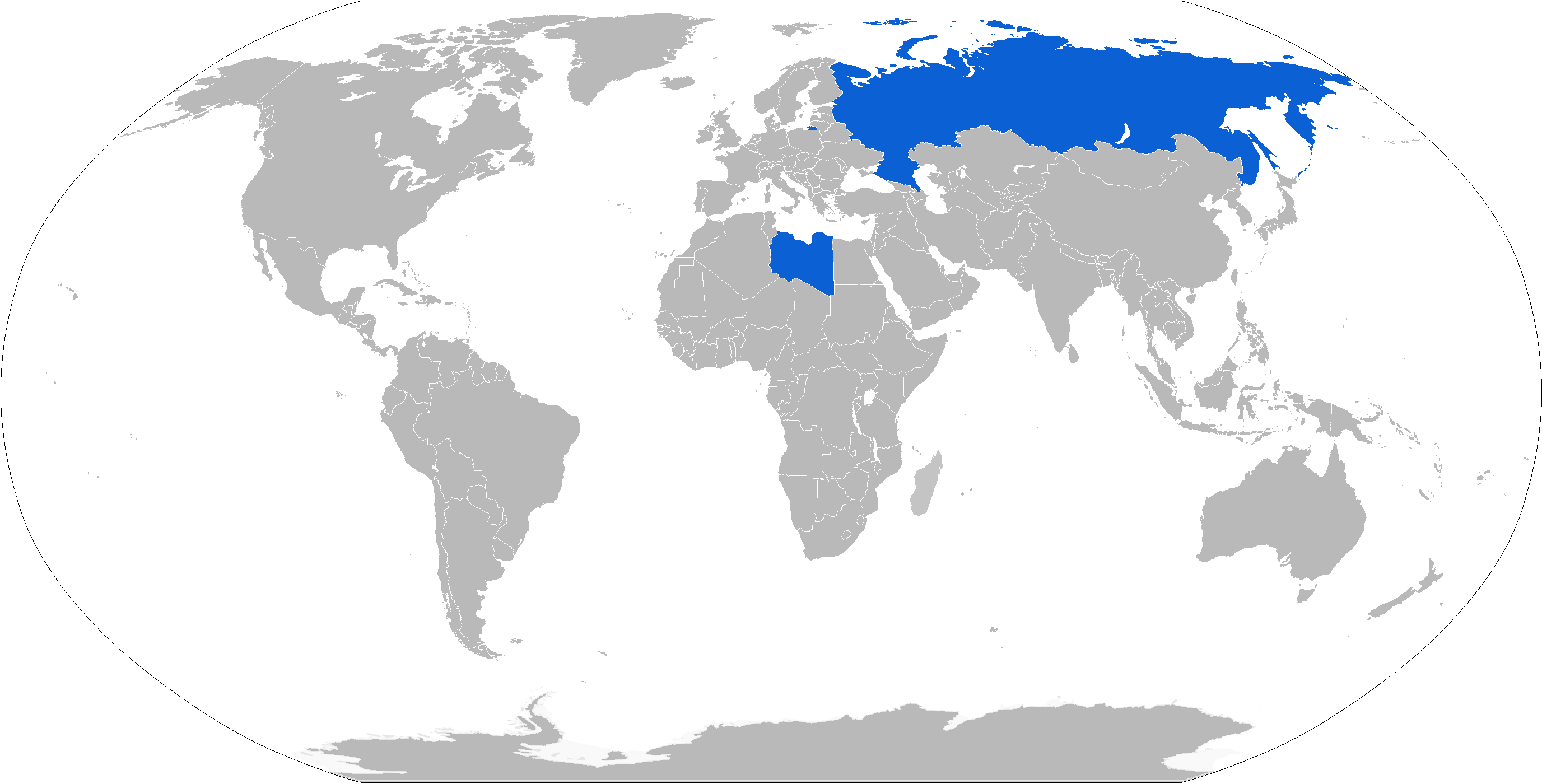
Map with 9M123 operators in blue

=== Current operators ===
- Azerbaijan
- Libya – 14 units
- Russia – About 50 units

== See also ==
- 9M133 Kornet – (Russia)
- AGM-114 Hellfire – (United States)
- 9M120 Ataka – (Soviet Union)
- 9K121 Vikhr – (Soviet Union)
- 9K114 Shturm – (Soviet Union)
- PARS 3 LR – (Germany)
- HJ-10 – (China)
