= 3M6 Shmel =

1950s Soviet anti-tank missile

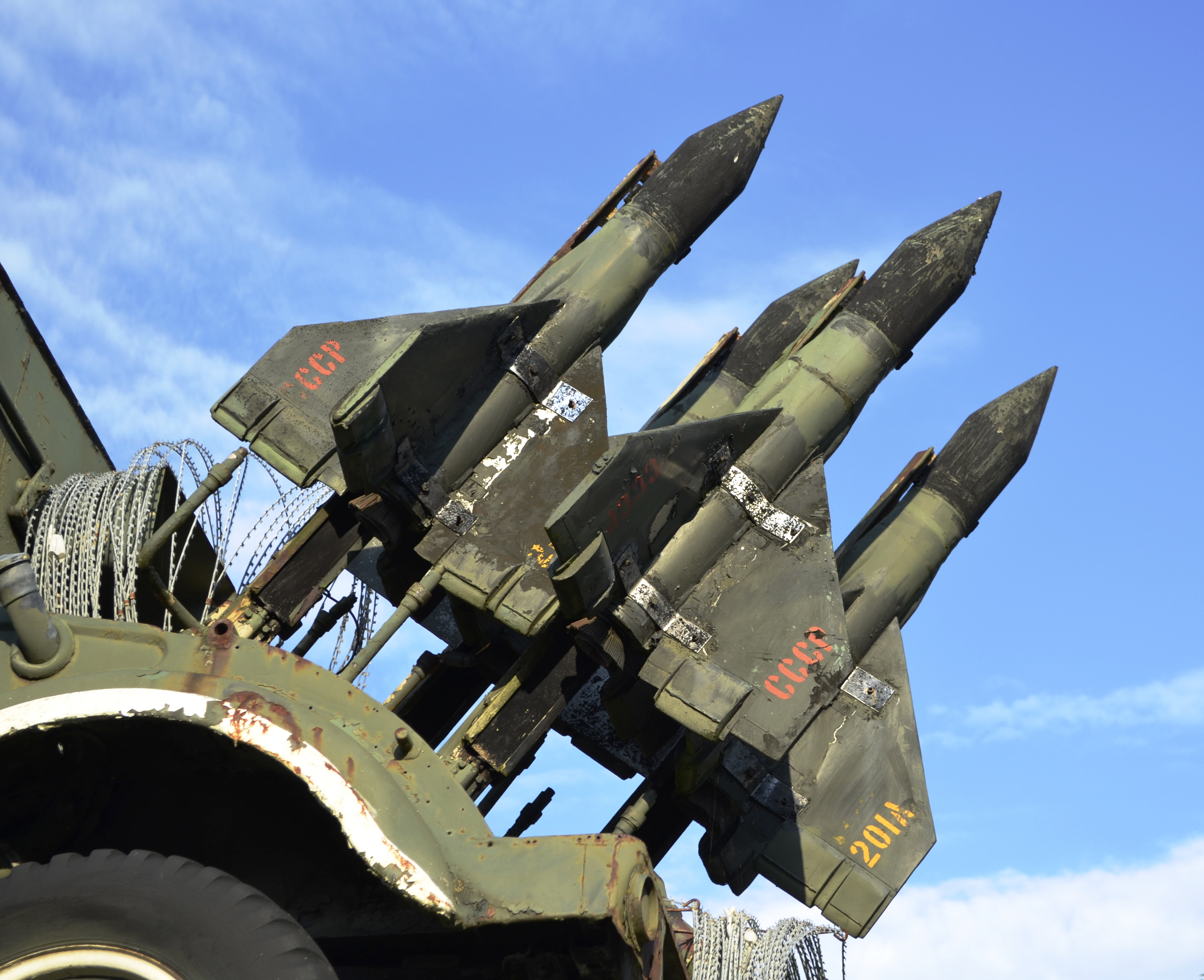
3M6 Shmel / AT-1 Snapper anti-tank missiles.

The 3M6 Shmel (Russian: Шмель, lit. 'bumblebee') is an MCLOS wire-guided anti-tank missile of the Soviet Union. Its GRAU designation is "3M6" and its NATO reporting name is AT-1 Snapper.

Too large to be man portable, it was typically deployed from specialised vehicles or helicopters. The missile was intended to supplement traditional anti-tank weapons, like the 100 mm anti-tank gun whose accuracy beyond 1,500 m is poor. The missile's accuracy in contrast remained high as far as its maximum range of 2,000 m.

However, the system's bulk, slow speed and poor combat accuracy drove development of later SACLOS systems, like the 9M113 Konkurs.

== Development ==
The 3M6 Shmel began development through Decree No. 7 on May 27, 1957. Development would be spread across several bureaus and research institutes, with the missile complex and rocket being designed by SKB-4, led by Boris Shavyrin under the leadership of the to-be famous Sergey Nepobedimy, being based on the Nord Aviation SS.10. Teams from TsNII-113, led by Zinovy Moiseevich Persits, would handle the design of the control system. Meanwhile, the charge for the solid-propellant rocket engine would be designed by NII-125, and the HEAT warhead by NII-6.

Development of the missile proceeded rapidly, with the first unguided flights in April 1958 followed by controlled flights in June and July 1958, where testing showed the probability of a hit to be anywhere from 75—90%, depending on the range. However, Soviet Army field exercises showed that hit rates could decrease to as low as 25% due to the complexity of the guidance system.

=== Reveal and Western reaction ===
The system would enter service by August 1st, 1960. Later, parade 2P27 vehicles sporting four 2K16 launchers on May 1st, 1962 were noted by Western observers in parade formation, just before the 1962 Moscow Victory Day Parade. The weapon would later be described in the US Army journal Military Review as being 'about the same size' and having 'approximately the same range' as the French SS.11, later overestimating its range to be from 500 to 3,000 metres.

== History ==
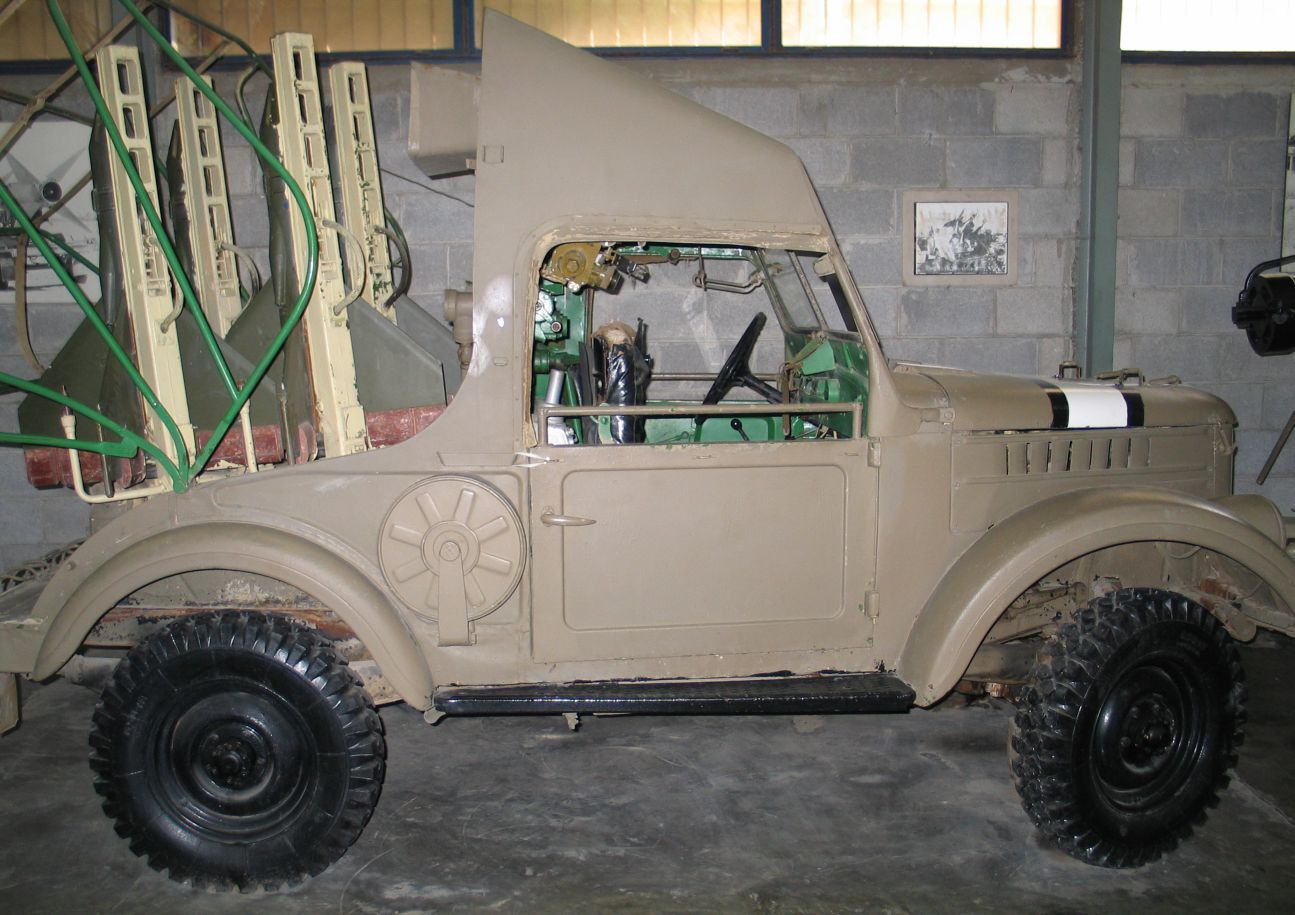
2P26 in Batey ha-Osef Museum, Israel.

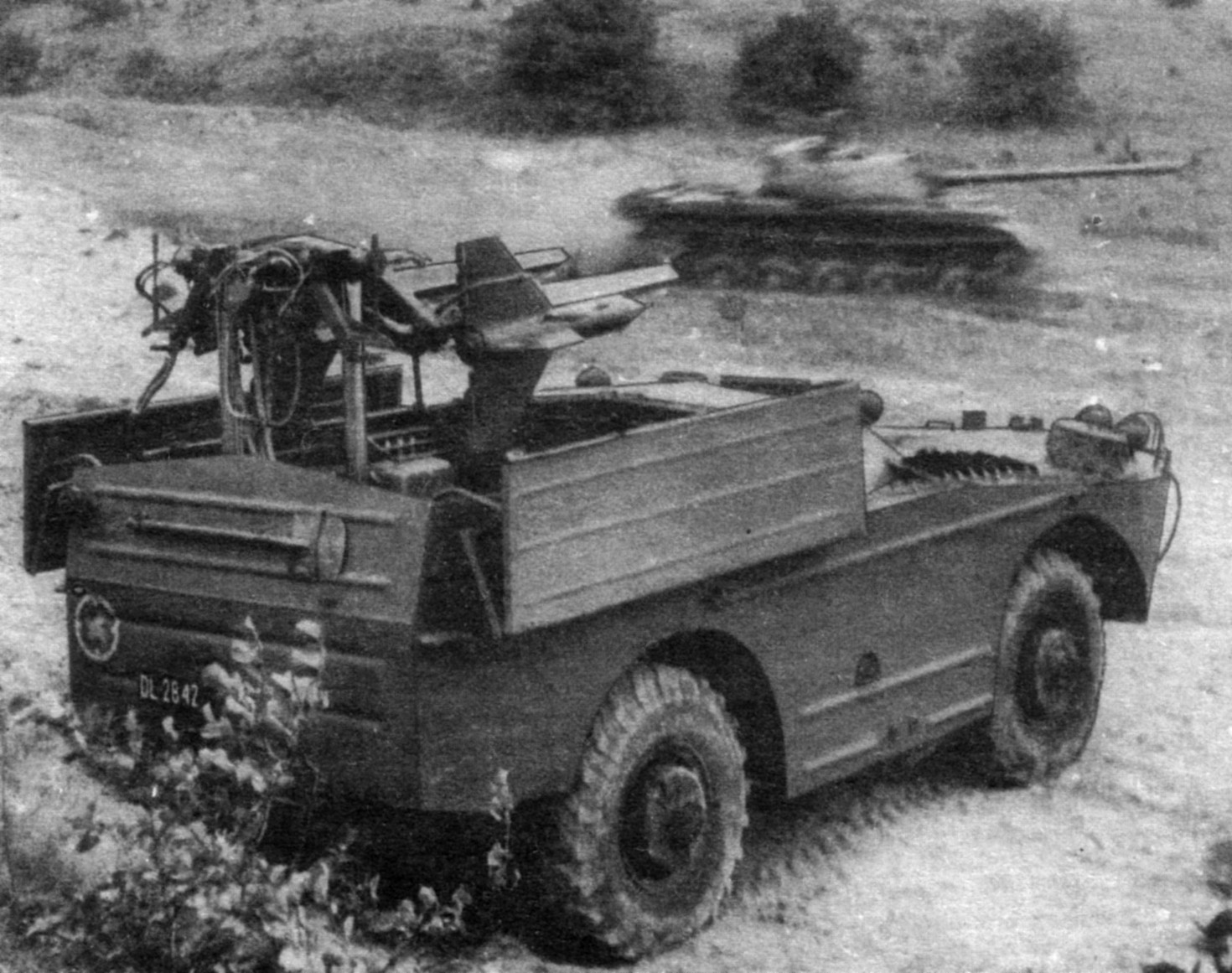
Polish 2P27

There were two ground-based platforms for the missile

- 2P26 Based on the unarmored GAZ-69 light truck - with four backward pointing launch rails. The control station can be deployed up to 30 m away from the launcher vehicle. It entered service in 1960
- 2P27 Based on the armored BRDM-1 - with three pop up launch rails protected by an armored cover. It entered service in 1964.

These vehicles were deployed in anti-tank batteries attached to motor rifle regiments. Each battery has three platoons, each with three launch vehicles and a single command BRDM.

While a few were used by Egyptian forces during the 1967 Six-Day War and from 1969 in the War of Attrition, only one tank loss was attributed to the system. The system's hit probability is estimated to have been 25% in combat.

The system was also used by the Cypriot National Guard during the 1974 Turkish invasion of Cyprus in a man-portable version. Several dozen shots were fired in action during a number of July and August engagements in the conflict, with low effectiveness.

North Korea began producing a reverse-engineered version of the missile in 1975.

== Description ==
The missile is guided to the target by means of a joystick, which requires some skill on the part of the operator. The operator's adjustments are transmitted to the missile via a thin wire that trails behind the missile.

The missile is steered by an unconventional arrangement of vibrating spoilers.

As stated before, MCLOS requires considerable skill on the part of the operator. The system's effectiveness in combat drove the development of missiles based on the easier to use SACLOS system.

One problem with the missile is the amount of time it takes to reach maximum range—around 20 seconds—giving the intended target time to take action, either by retreating behind an obstacle, laying down a smoke screen or firing on the operator. Also, the large size of the missile means that only a few rounds can be carried; the BRDM-1 vehicle can only carry three missiles.

== Operators ==
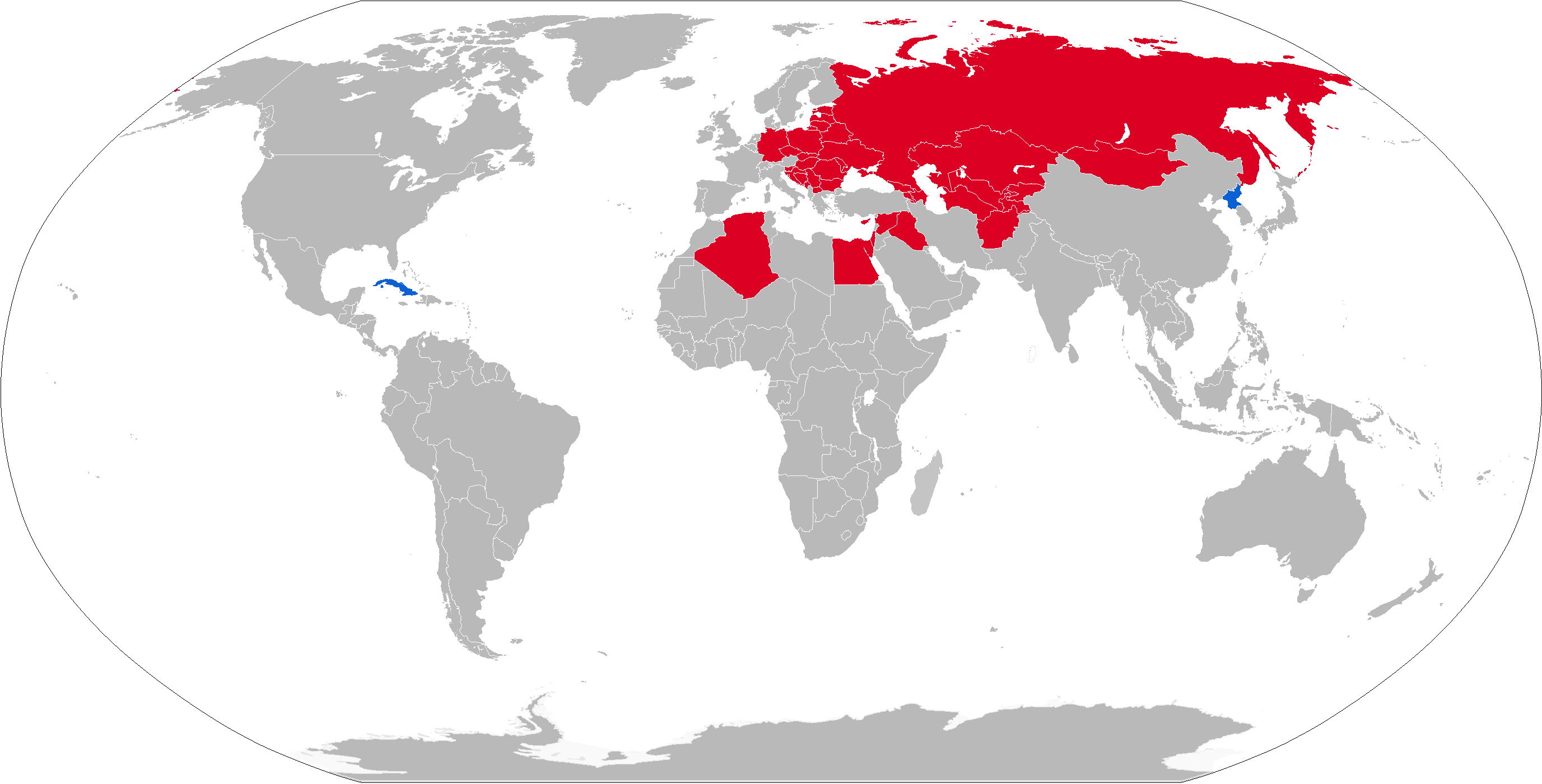
Map with 3M6 operators in blue with former operators in red

=== Current ===
- Cuba
- North Korea

=== Former ===
- Afghanistan
- Algeria
- Bulgaria
- Cyprus − 80 missiles received in 1973 in violation of the Greek and Turkish Cypriot arms embargo.
- Czechoslovakia
- East Germany
- Egypt
- Hungary
- Iraq
- Israel - Captured units from Egypt and Syria.
- Mongolia − 100 missiles received in 1963.
- Poland
- Romania
- Soviet Union
- Syria
- Yugoslavia - 500 missiles received between 1964 and 1965.

== General characteristics ==
- Length: 1150 mm
- Wingspan: 750 mm
- Diameter: 136 mm
- Launch weight: 22.5 kg
- Speed: 90 to 110 m/s
- Range: 500 m to 2.3 km
- Time to maximum range: 20 seconds
- Guidance: wire-guided MCLOS
- Warhead: 5.4 kg HEAT 300 mm vs RHA
