= OTR-23 Oka =

Russian theatre ballistic missile

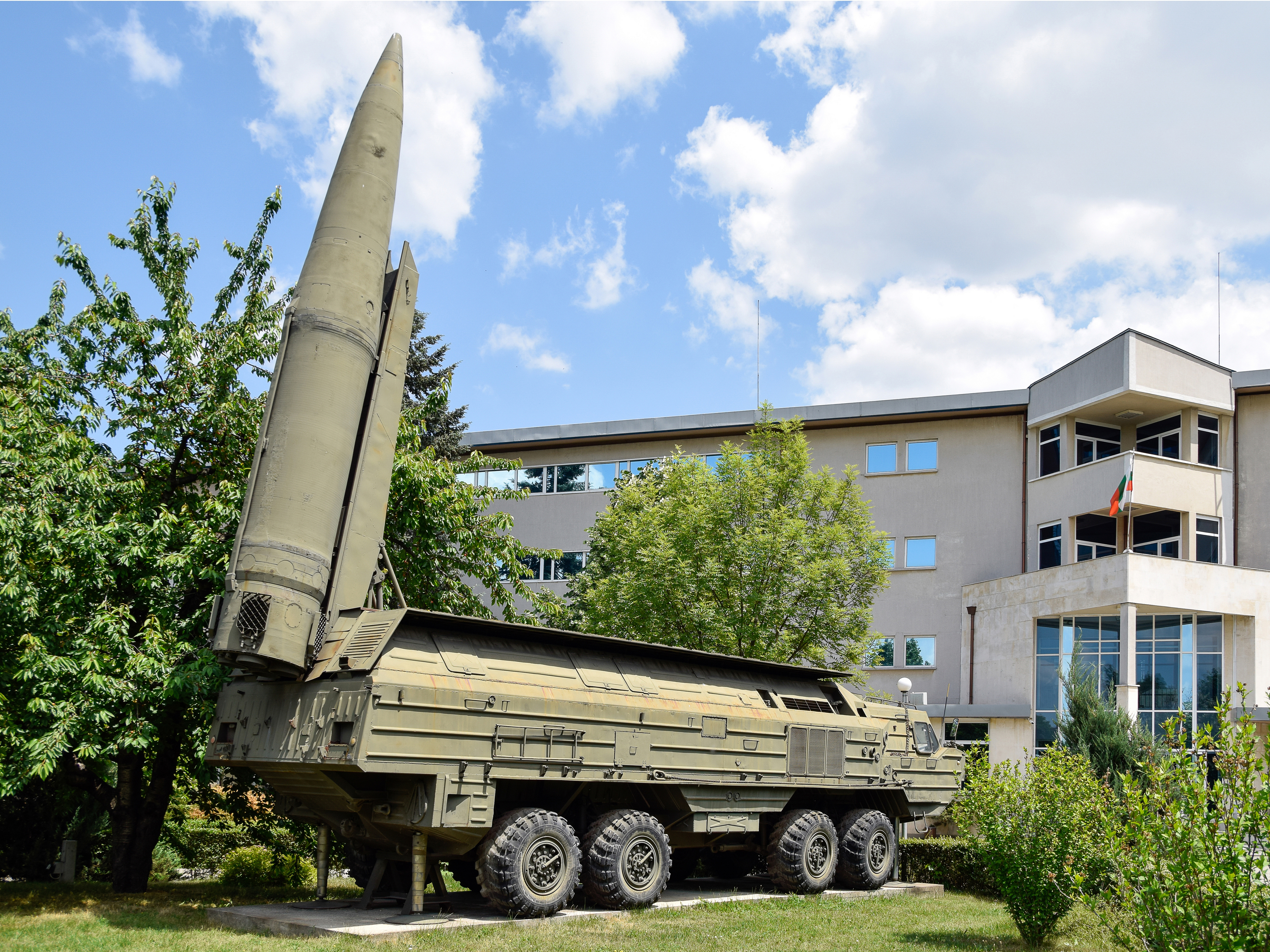
- A 9P71 TEL at the National Museum of Military History in Sofia, Bulgaria.
- Type: Short-range ballistic missile
- Place of origin: Soviet Union

Service history
- In service: 1980−1989 (USSR)
- Used by: See operators

Production history
- Designer: Sergey Nepobedimy
- Designed: 1972
- Manufacturer: Votkinsk Machine Building Plant
- No. built: 450
- Variants: See variants

Specifications
- Mass: 4,630 kg (10,210 lb)
- Length: 7.32 m (24.0 ft)
- Diameter: 0.97 m (3 ft 2 in) (Note: Photographic analysis indicates that 0.97 m figure was the maximum diameter and the actual body diameter was 0.89 m (2 ft 11 in).)
- Warhead: High explosive fragmentation, cluster, chemical, nuclear
- Warhead weight: 716–772 kg (1,579–1,702 lb)
- Propellant: Single-stage solid-fuel rocket
- Operational range: 500 km (310 mi)
- Guidance system: Inertial with active radar homing
- Accuracy: 30 m (98 ft) CEP
- Launch platform: 9P71 TEL

The OTR-23 Oka (Russian: OTP-23 «Ока»; named after Oka River) was a mobile theatre ballistic missile (Russian: оперативно-тактический ракетный комплекс) deployed by the Soviet Union near the end of the Cold War to replace the obsolete R-17 Elbrus. It carried the GRAU index 9K714 and was assigned the NATO reporting name SS-23 Spider. The introduction of the Oka significantly strengthened Soviet theatre nuclear capabilities as its range and accuracy allowed it not only to strike hardened NATO targets such as airfields, nuclear delivery systems, and command centers, but moving targets as well. It also had a fast reaction time, being able to fire in approximately five minutes, and was nearly impossible to intercept, thereby allowing it to penetrate defenses.

== Development ==
During the mid-1960s the Soviets began developing a replacement for the R-17 Elbrus (NATO reporting name: SS-1C Scud B), which had some serious drawbacks including slow launching time, dangerous fuel, (Note: The red fuming nitric acid oxidizer used on the Scud-B is extremely corrosive, reacting violently in contact with human flesh, requiring Scud crews to wear hazmat suits when fueling the missiles.) and poor accuracy. After starting with some design concepts in 1965−1971, development of the 9M714 missile started in 1972 at the Machine Industry Design Bureau (KBM) in Kolomna led by Sergey Nepobedimy, the same design bureau that developed the OTR-21 Tochka. The 9M714, designed as an extended range version of the Tochka, used solid fuel which could be quickly loaded and fired with a smaller crew and less support vehicles. The Oka could be readied for launch in less than 30 minutes (Note: According to Lennox, the Oka had an estimated reaction time of 5−10 minutes.) in comparison to the Scud-B, which takes about 90 minutes to be prepared for launch.

== Description ==
The 9K714 Oka used a 9P71 transporter erector launcher built on the BAZ-6944 8×8 truck chassis and the missile was fully enclosed during travel, which not only provided some protection against enemy attacks but also kept the missile under a controlled temperature. The TEL was 11.76 m (38.6 ft) long, 3.13 m (10.3 ft) wide, and when fully loaded it had a total mass of 24,070 kg (53,070 lb). The 9P71 had an estimated road speed of 60 km/h (37 mph), was amphibious, and provided NBC protection for the crew. A reloader vehicle similar to the TEL was also provided, under the 9T230 designation.

The 9M714 missile used a single-stage solid propellant motor with four exhaust nozzles. The guidance system had a TsNIIAG inertial platform with an onboard digital computer, coupled with a MMW active radar homing system, giving the missile a circular error probable of 30 m (98 ft). It could carry a conventional high explosive fragmentation (9M74F), cluster munitions (9M74K), chemical, or nuclear (9M63) warheads. Missiles fitted with the nuclear warhead received the designation 9M714B and the warhead had a mass of 772 kg (1,702 lb), while missiles fitted with the cluster warheads were designated as the 9M714K, while the warhead had a total of 95 submunitions and a mass of 716 kg (1,579 lb). The Intermediate-Range Nuclear Forces Treaty (INF) included photographs indicating that the 9M714 could be fitted with an earth penetrating warhead which could carry either a nuclear or conventional HE payload. The missile had a minimum range of 50 km (31 mi) and a maximum range of over 500 km (310 mi), though some reports suggested a range of 480 km (300 mi).

== Variants ==
- 9K714 Oka − Original version with a range of over 500 km (310 mi).
- Oka-U − In 1984, the Soviets worked on a reconnaissance and strike system similar to the American Assault Breaker. It was intended to include both a weapon system and integrated airborne intelligence gathering system based on the Myasishchev M-55 (NATO reporting name: Mystic-B) aircraft. The system was ready for trials in 1989, but the program was abandoned with the dissolution of the Soviet Union in 1991.
- Sphera − A proposed satellite launch vehicle conversion of the Oka, it had a launch mass of 3,300 kg (7,300 lb) and could place a 415 kg (915 lb) payload into low Earth orbit at a 275 km (171 mi) altitude.

== Operational history ==
The operational life of the Oka was limited and controversial. The Soviet military asserted that the Oka had a maximum range of 400 km (250 miles). American experts, however, estimated it had a greater range. In 1987, Mikhail Gorbachev proposed to George Shultz that he would unilaterally remove all Okas, if it would prevent the United States from building up its own short-range nuclear forces in Europe, despite the fact that the Soviet military was in favor of the Oka. Shultz however lacked the authority to act on the suggestion. Gorbachev included the Oka in the class of systems to be discontinued as part of the INF Treaty as a gesture of goodwill, even though Soviet assertions of its maximum range did not put it outside the specifications of the treaty.

There was diplomatic controversy over this weapon in April 1990, when the Soviets informed the US of their covert transfer of at least 120 missiles to the Warsaw Pact states of Czechoslovakia, Bulgaria, and East Germany during the time of negotiation of the Intermediate-Range Nuclear Forces Treaty. Evidence indicates that the missiles were transferred with conventional warheads only, although equipment to load Soviet nuclear warheads was apparently retained.

== Missile variants ==
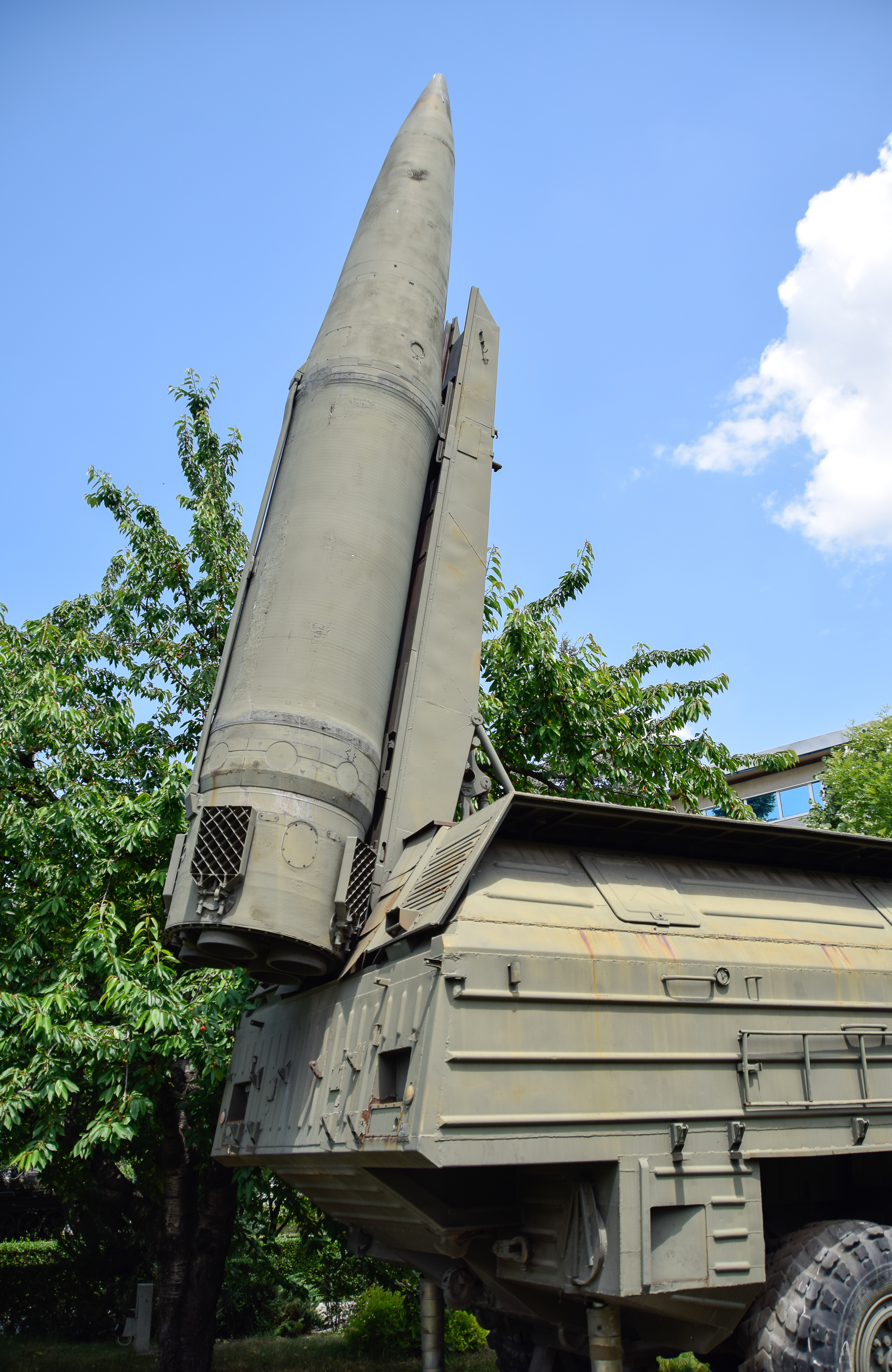
The 9M714 missile, erected on its TEL

- The 9M714B missile armed with the AA-60 (9N63) nuclear warhead and possessing a maximum range of 500 km
- The 9M714F missile armed with a FRAG-HE warhead weighing 450 kg and possessing a maximum range of 450 km
- The 9M714K missile armed with a submunitions warhead 9N74K weighing 715 kg and possessing a maximum range of 300 km

In addition to these warheads, the OTR-23 Oka was also reported to be able to deliver chemical munitions.

== Operators ==
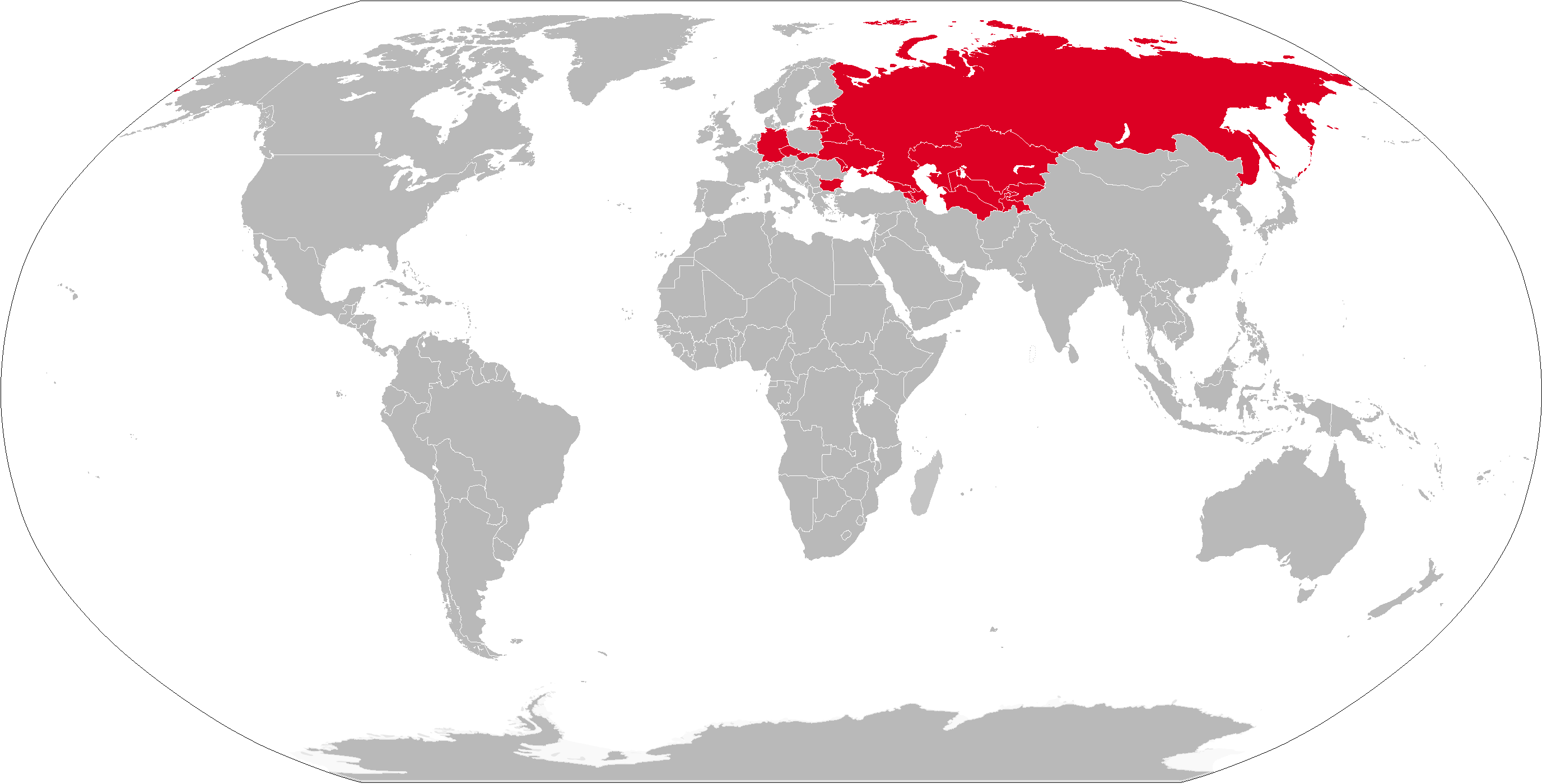
Map with former OTR-23 operators in red

=== Former operators ===
Bulgaria
Phased out in 2002
Czech Republic
Phased out in the 1990s
Czechoslovakia
Passed on to successor states
East Germany
Phased out in the 1990s, shortly before the reunification with West-Germany
Slovakia
Phased out in 2000
Soviet Union
Phased out as directed by the INF Treaty

== See also ==
- List of missiles

== Bibliography ==
- Lennox, Duncan, ed. (2003). Jane's Strategic Weapons Systems (38th ed.). Surrey: Jane's Information Group. ISBN 978-0-7106-0880-2.
- Zaloga, Steven J. (2013). Scud Ballistic Missile and Launch Systems 1955–2005. Bloomsbury Publishing. ISBN 978-1-4728-0306-1.
