= KB Mashinostroyeniya =

Russian defense company

Coordinates: 55.051°N 38.791°E

- Company type: Joint-stock company
- Industry: Defense
- Founded: 1942
- Headquarters: Kolomna, Russia
- Products: Mortars, ATGMs, MPADS, Recoilless rifles, Ballistic missiles, Active protection systems, Anti-aircraft defence systems
- Owner: High Precision Systems (Rostec)
- Website: kbm.ru

KB Mashinostroyeniya or KBM for short (Russian: КБ Машиностроения, КБМ, lit. 'Machine-Building Design Bureau') is a state defence enterprise, scientific and design R&D centre specialised in missile systems located in Kolomna, Moscow region, Russia and part of Rostec state corporation.

KBM was founded on 11 April 1942 by order 1576 of the State Defence Committee for the mortar designs. Its first chief was Boris Shavyrin. The company was awarded the Order of Lenin and the Order of Labour Red Banner.

Former names include SKB-101, SKB-GA (Russian: Специальное конструкторское бюро гладкоствольной артиллерии, СКБ ГА, lit. 'Special KB (Design Bureau) of smooth-bore artillery'). The company is also sometimes known as Kolomna Mechanical Engineering Design Bureau .

The company is part of the High Precision Systems group.

Its main constructors were Sergey Nepobedimiy and Andranik Ter-Stepaniyan.

V. M. Sokolov is currently the Chief and General Designer.

== Products ==
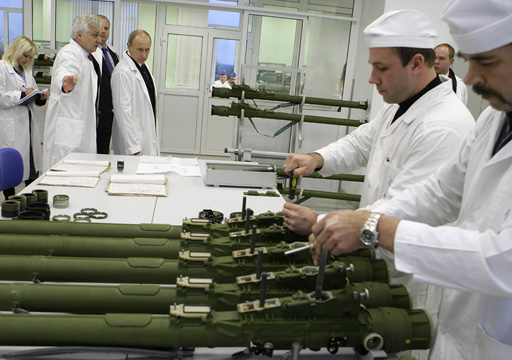
Putin visiting KB Mashinostroyeniya in 2009

KBM produced more than 80% of all mortar types in USSR. Also, designed:

- Anti-aircraft defence systems
  - Gibka-S self-propelled air defense system.
- Anti-tank recoilless rifles B-10 and B-11
- Man-portable air-defense systems
  - 9K333 Verba / Верба
  - 9K38 Igla (SA-18 "Grouse") / Игла
  - 9K32 Strela-2 and 9K32M Strela-2M (SA-7 and SA-7b "Grail") / Стрела-2
  - 9K34 Strela-3 (SA-14 "Gremlin") / Стрела-3
  - Dzhigit / Джигит
  - Strelets / Стрелец
- Anti-tank missile systems
  - Shmel / Шмель
  - Malyutka (AT-3 "Sagger") / Малютка
  - 9M114 Shturm (AT-6 "Spiral") / Штурм
  - 9M120 Ataka (AT-9 "Spiral-2") / Атака
  - 9M123 Khrizantema (AT-15 "Springer") / Хризантема
- Theatre ballistic missiles
  - R-400 Oka / Ока
  - OTR-21 Tochka / ОТРК Точка, Точка-У
  - Iskander, Iskander-M, Iskander-E / ОТРК Искандер, Искандер-М, Искандер-Э
- Active Protection Systems:
  - KAZ Arena, Arena-E Арена-Э
