= Lyubertsy Soyuz Science Production Association =

Russian chemical company

Coordinates: 55°37′27″N 37°50′9″E

The Federal center for dual-use technologies "Soyuz"

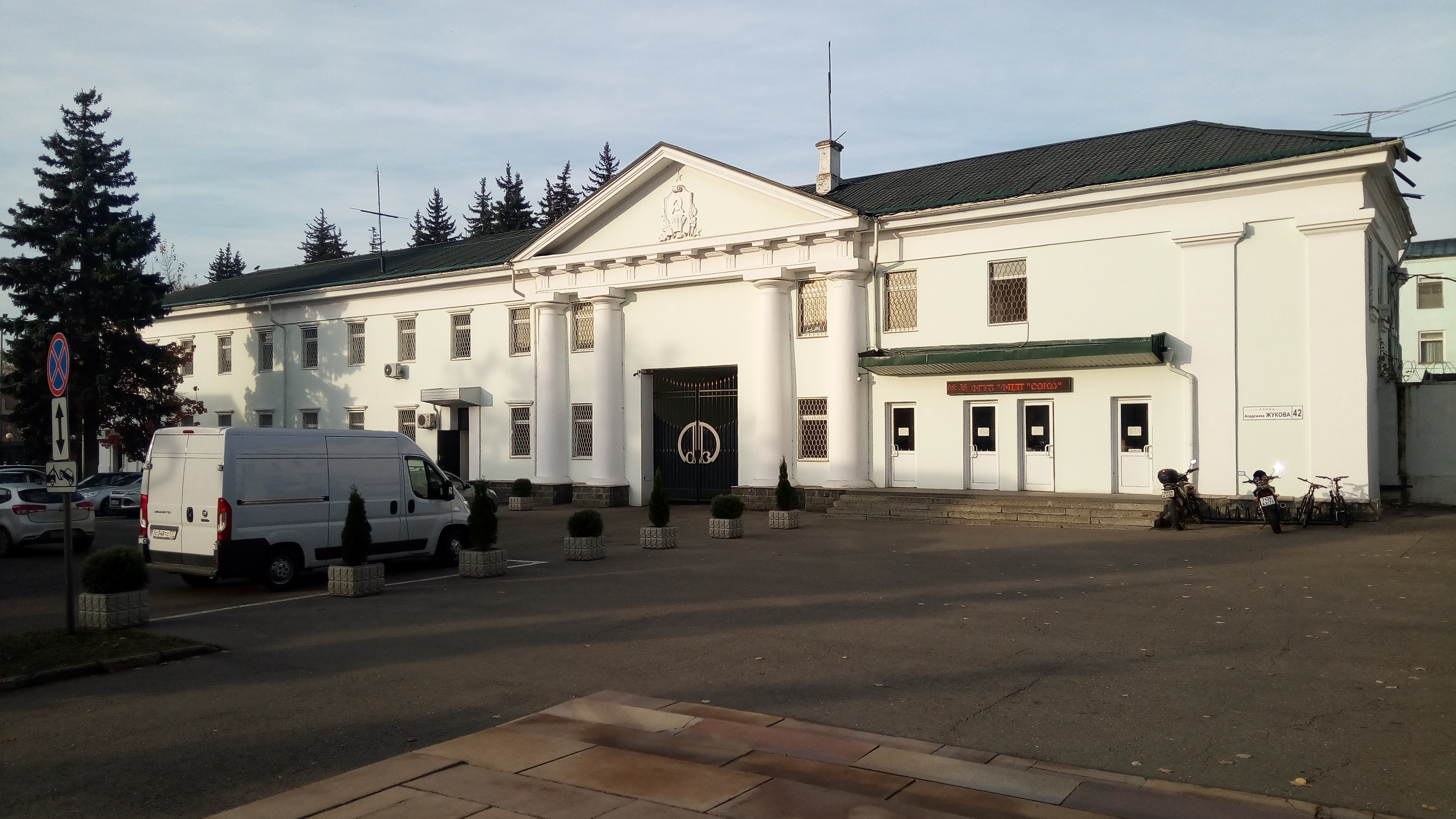
- Type: Federal State Unitary Enterprise
- Founded: 1947
- Headquarters: Dzerzhinsk, Russia
- Key people: Zinovy Petrovich Pak (Director); Boris Petrovich Zhukov (Director)
- Website: www.fcdt.ru

The Federal center for dual-use technologies "Soyuz" (before: Lyubertsy Soyuz Science Production Association) (Russian: ЛНПО «Союз») is a research, development and production facility for both double-base and composite solid propellant rockets. It is based in Dzerzhinsk, Russia.

The Lyubertsy Soyuz Science and Production Association (LNPO Soyuz) is located near the site of the historic Nikolo-Ugreshkiy Monastery in the small city of Dzerzhinsk southeast of the Moscow Ring Road. In addition to offering solid rocket motors for civilian applications, LNPO Soyuz is commercially expanding based on its solid rocket propellant technology and a large variety of polymer products.
