= 9K114 Shturm =

Soviet/Russian anti-tank missile system

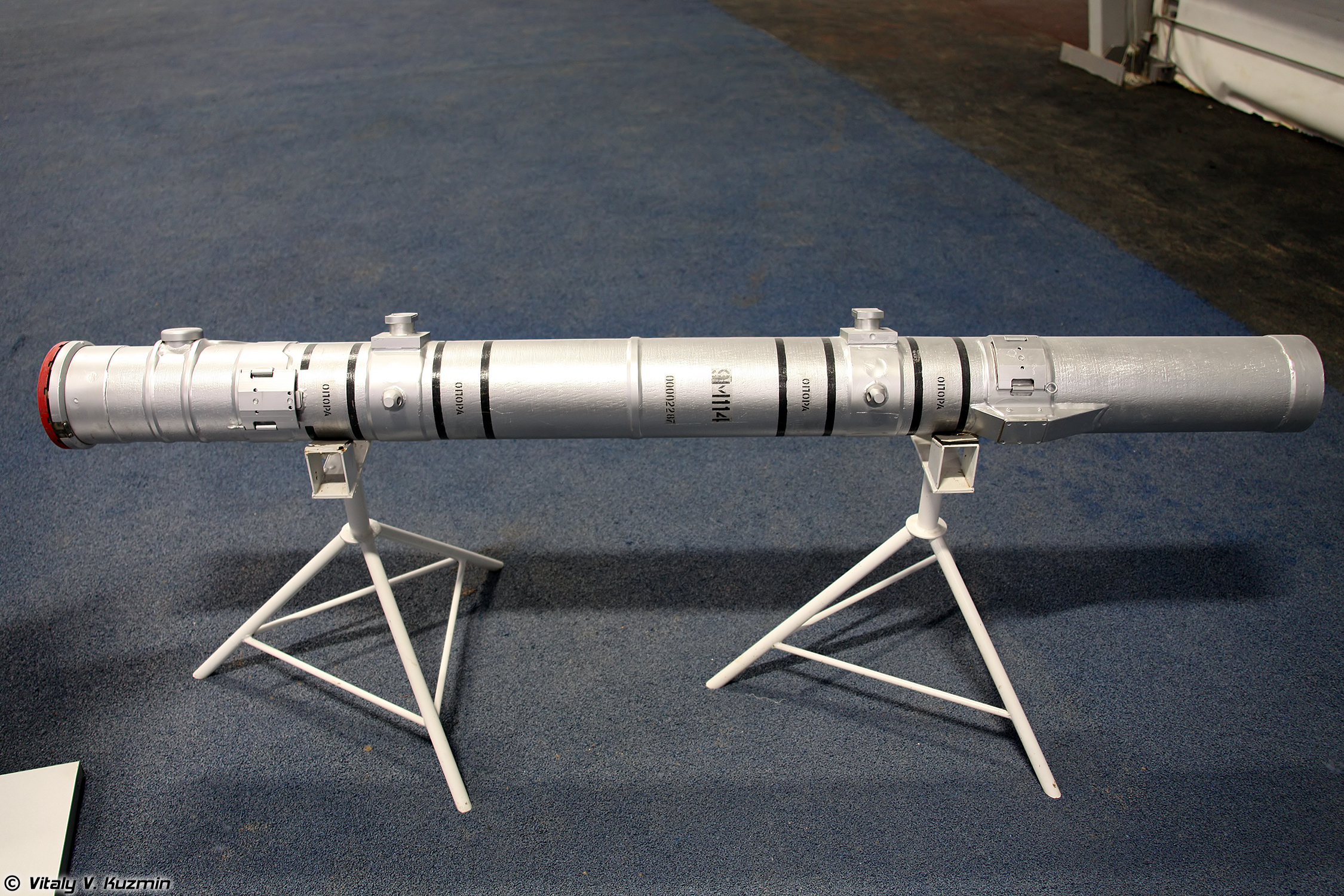
- 9K114 Shturm ATGM
- Type: ATGM
- Place of origin: Soviet Union

Service history
- Used by: Soviet Union; Russia; Ukraine
- Wars: Soviet–Afghan War; Russo-Ukrainian war

Production history
- Developed into: 9M120 Ataka

Specifications
- Effective firing range: 400 m to 5 km

9K114 Shturm (Russian: 9К114 «Штурм», lit. 'Assault') – is a SACLOS radio guided anti-tank missile system of the Soviet Union. Its GRAU designation is 9K114. Its NATO reporting name is AT-6 Spiral. The missile itself is known as the 9M114 Kokon (Cocoon).

== Development ==
The missile called 9M114 Kokon (Cocoon) was developed by the Kolomna Machine Design Bureau, which was also responsible for the 3M6 Shmel and 9M14 Malyutka. Work on the missile began in 1967, with the hope of using the missile on Mi-24s. However, delays forced the design of an upgraded Falanga system (9M17 Skorpion) using SACLOS guidance as a stopgap. Testing of the missile was completed in 1974, and it was accepted into service in 1976. The missile has no direct western counterpart; in role it is similar to the TOW and HOT missiles which entered service around the same time, though the Shturm has greater weight, speed, and range.

It was originally given the NATO designation AS-8, before being redesignated as AT-6.

== Description ==
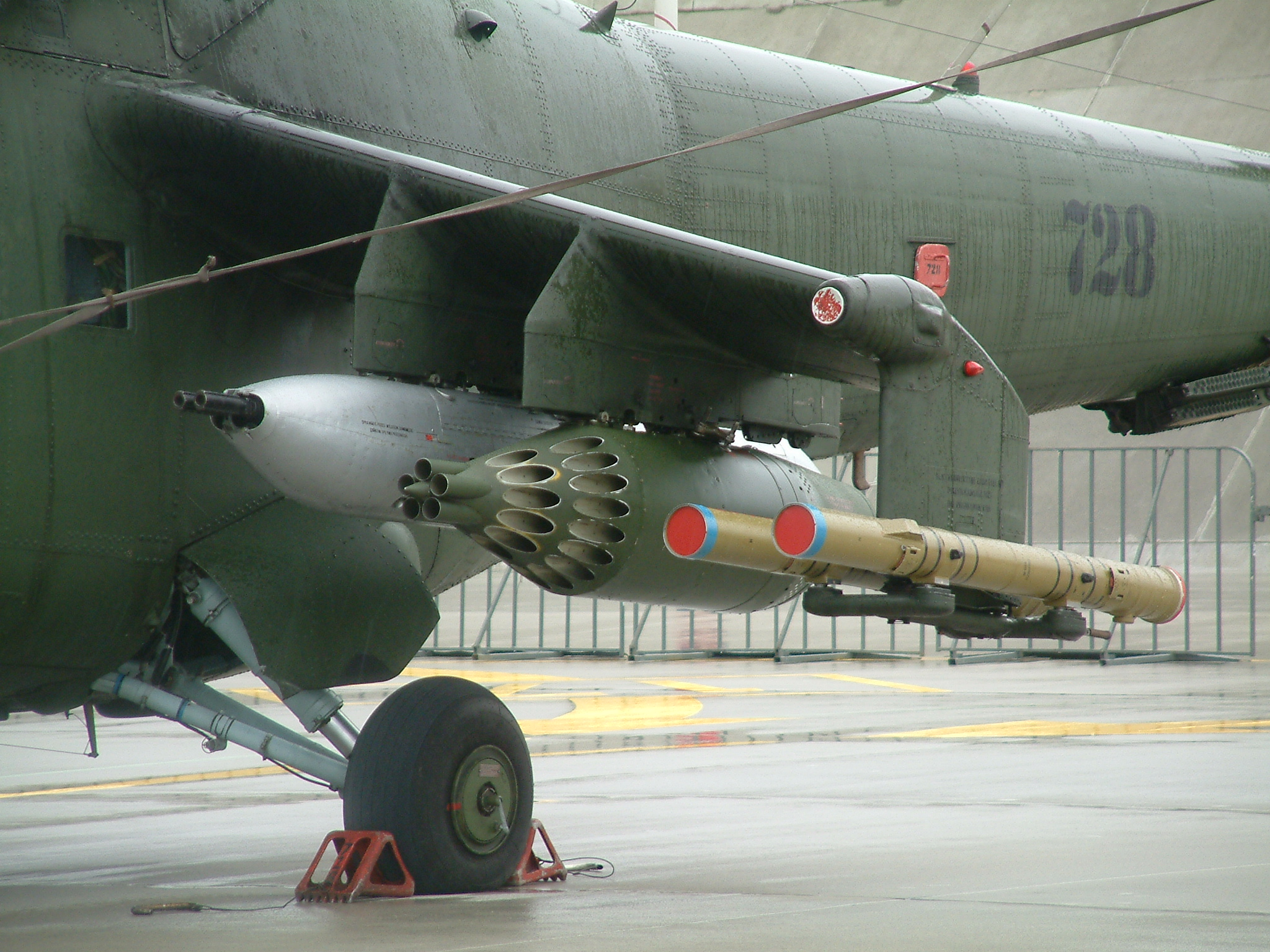
Shturm launch tubes(right) on the wing of an Mi-24

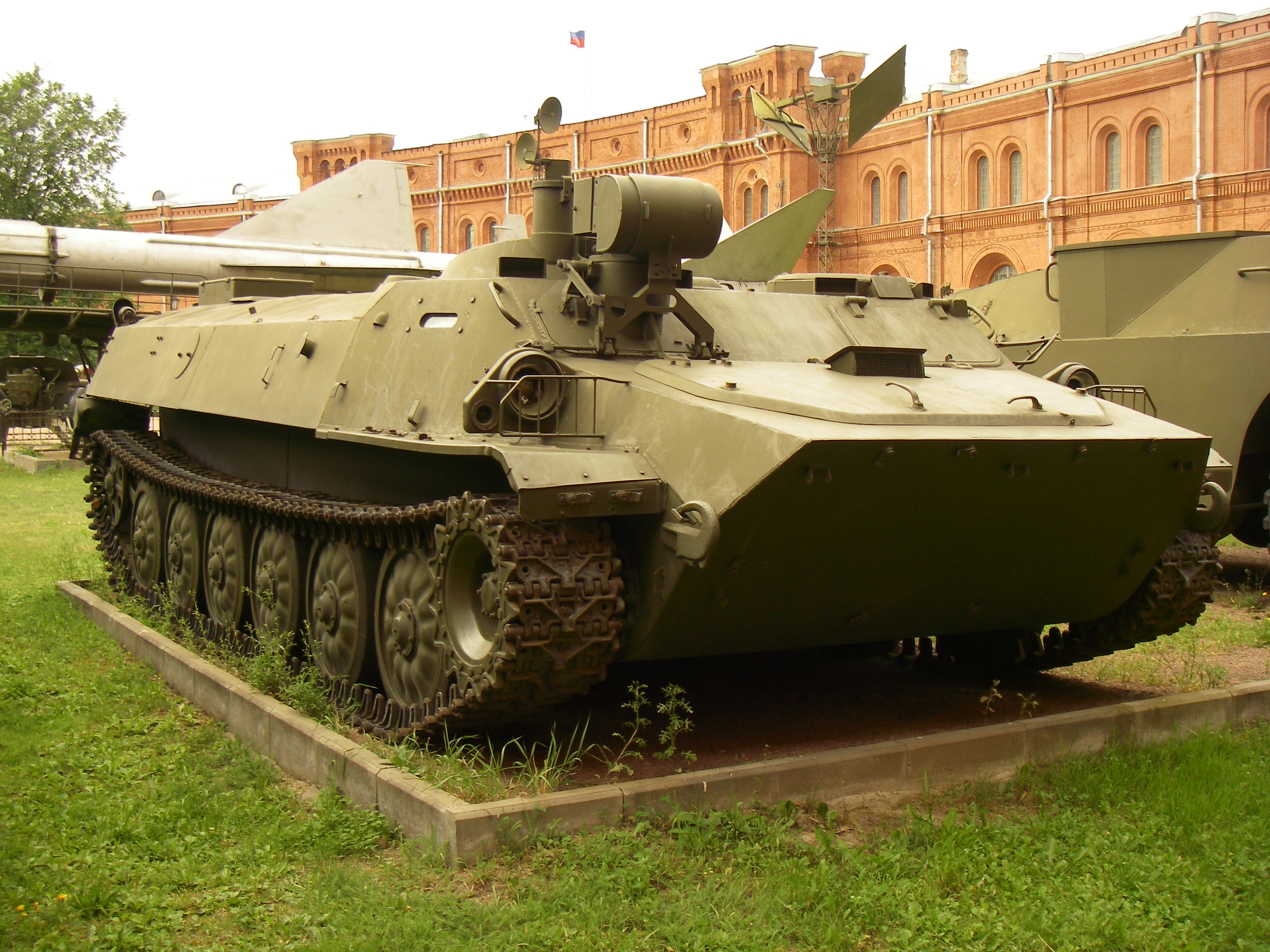
9P149 Shturm-S in Saint Petersburg Artillery Museum

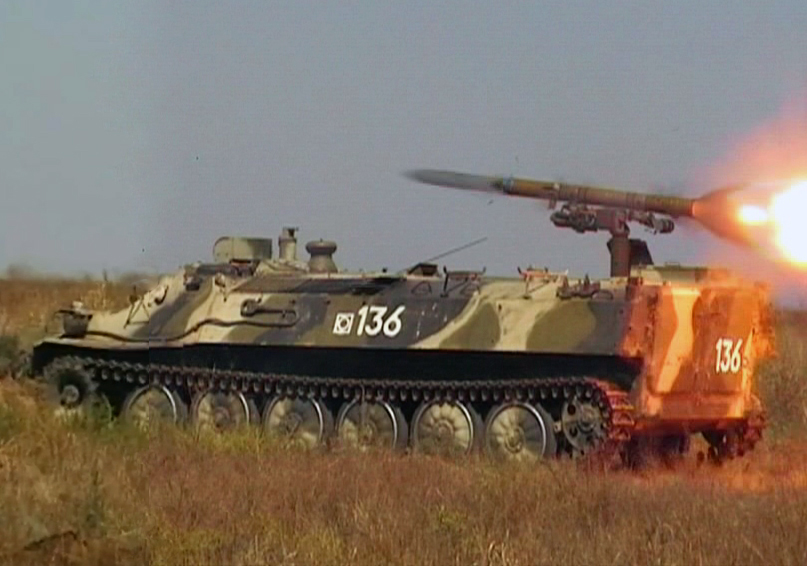
9P149 vehicle with 9M114 missiles of anti-tank complex «Shturm-S» is firing

The missile can be deployed on a variety of platforms, including the Mi-24V and from 1979-onwards the MT-LB based 9P149 tank destroyer. There is also a shipborne version of the missile, with the launcher holding six missiles.

The missile is transported and launched from a glass-reinforced plastic tube. The missile uses a Soyuz NPO solid-rocket sustainer, with a small booster stage to launch the missile from its tube.

The missile is SACLOS with a radio command link. The use of a radio link allows the missile to travel much faster and further than if it were wire guided. The radio link is a VHF system with five frequency bands and two codes to minimize the risk of jamming. The system comprises a KPS-53AV 8× daylight-only direct vision sight with an integrated laser rangefinder. After the missile is launched, the gunner has to keep the sight's crosshairs on the target until impact. Appropriate steering commands are transmitted to the missile via the radio link.

The missile flies above the gunner's line of sight to the target. With the range of the target determined by the laser rangefinder, the missile descends onto the target just before impact. This is done primarily to clear obstacles, instead of achieving a top-attack, and can be switched off. It is possible to engage low and slow moving helicopters with the system; however, since the missile only has a contact fuze, a direct hit would be needed.

The first use of the missile was during the Soviet–Afghan War, where it was employed in the later stages of the war. By this time the Mujahideen had got access to more advanced anti aircraft weapons that forced Mi-24 pilots to adopt standoff tactics using the missile to increase survivability. Sources report kill ratios of 75–85% during the war. Also a Mil demonstration in Sweden in late 1995 using an Mi-28A firing Shturm and Ataka missiles also showed good results: from a hovering helicopter, a Shturm was fired at a target 900 m away; and from level flight at 200 km/h an Ataka was fired at a target 4,700 m away. Both missiles passed within 1 m of their aiming point. Other countries such as Iraq and Syria attempted to procure the missile in the 1980s but the Soviet Union did not export the system outside of the Warsaw Pact, fearing it might fall into western hands via Iran or Israel.

In 2014, a modernized variant, the 9K132 Shturm-SM, was adopted by the Russian army, featuring a sight with television and thermal channels as well as a new missile with a high-explosive fragmentation warhead and a proximity fuse.

== General characteristics (9M114 Kokon) ==
- Length: 1,625 mm (5.3 ft)
- Wingspan: 360 mm (14 in)
- Diameter: 130 mm (5.1 in)
- Launch weight: 31.4 kg (69 lb)
- Speed: 345 m/s (1,240 km/h; 770 mph; Mach 1.0)
- Range: 400–5,000 m (0.25–3.11 mi)
- Guidance: Radio command link Semi-automatic command to line of sight
- Warhead: 5.3 kg (12 lb) HEAT, penetration 560–600 mm vs RHA

== Variants ==
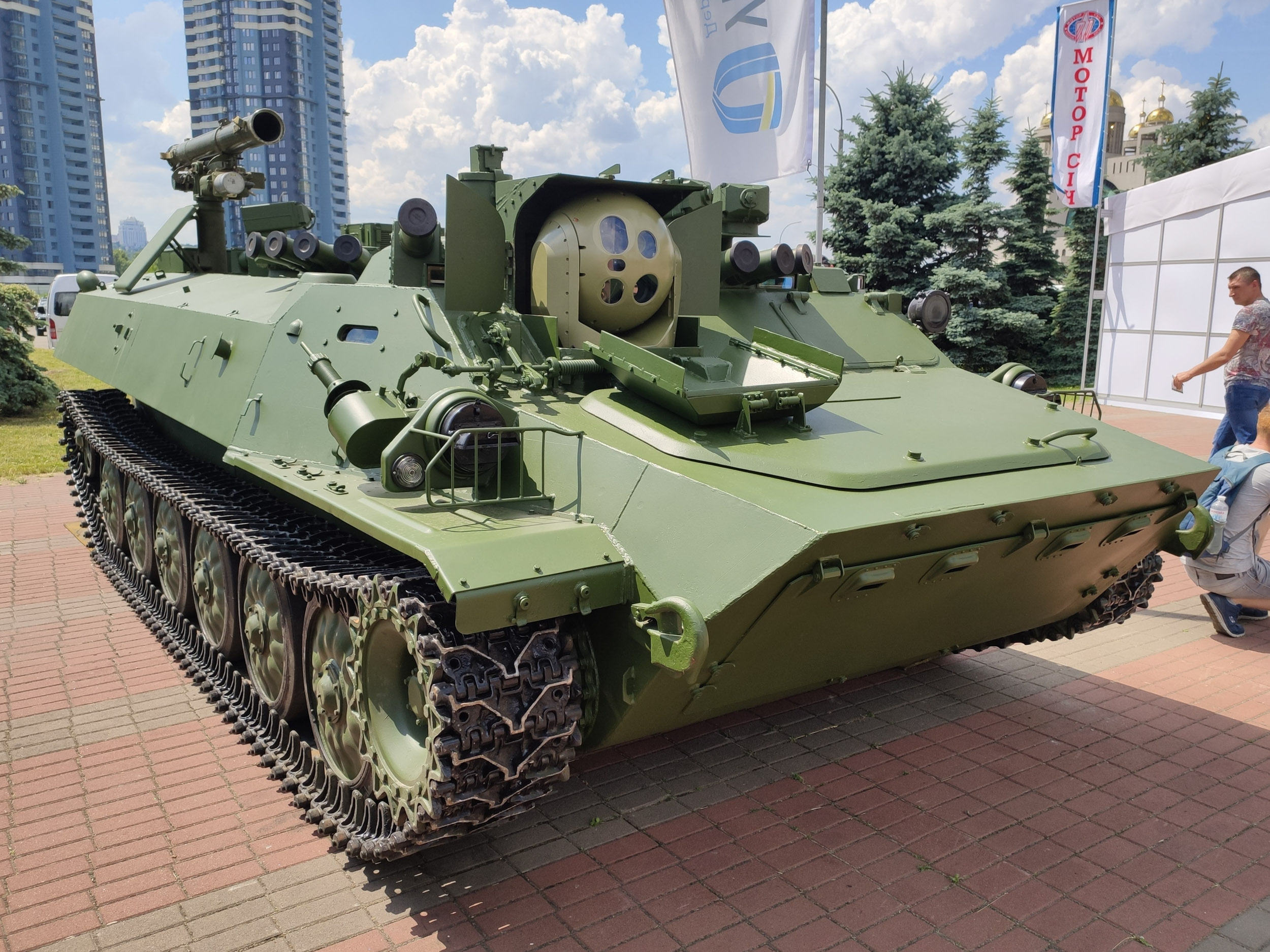
Barrier-S in 'Zbroya ta Bezpeka' military fair, Kyiv, Ukraine, 2021

- 9M114 Kokon / AT-6 Spiral Entered service in 1976.
  - 9M114V Shturm-V – Air to surface version for helicopters.
  - 9M114 Shturm / AT-6A Spiral SACLOS
    - 9M114M HEAT warhead.
    - 9M114F Thermobaric warhead.
  - 9M114M1 Shturm / AT-6B Spiral SACLOS, heavier 7.4 kg (16 lb) warhead penetrating 600–650 mm, longer 6 km (3.7 mi) range.
  - 9M114M2 Shturm / AT-6C Spiral SACLOS, further increased 7 km (4.3 mi) range.
- 9K113M Shturm-VM / AT-9 Spiral-2 – see 9M120 Ataka-V
- 543 Barrier-S – Ukrainian upgrade replaces the 9M114 Kokon/Cocoon SACLOS radio guided missile with more capable 7 km range missiles RK-2P and RK-2POF anti-tank guided missiles developed by Luch and a modern guidance system.

== Operators ==
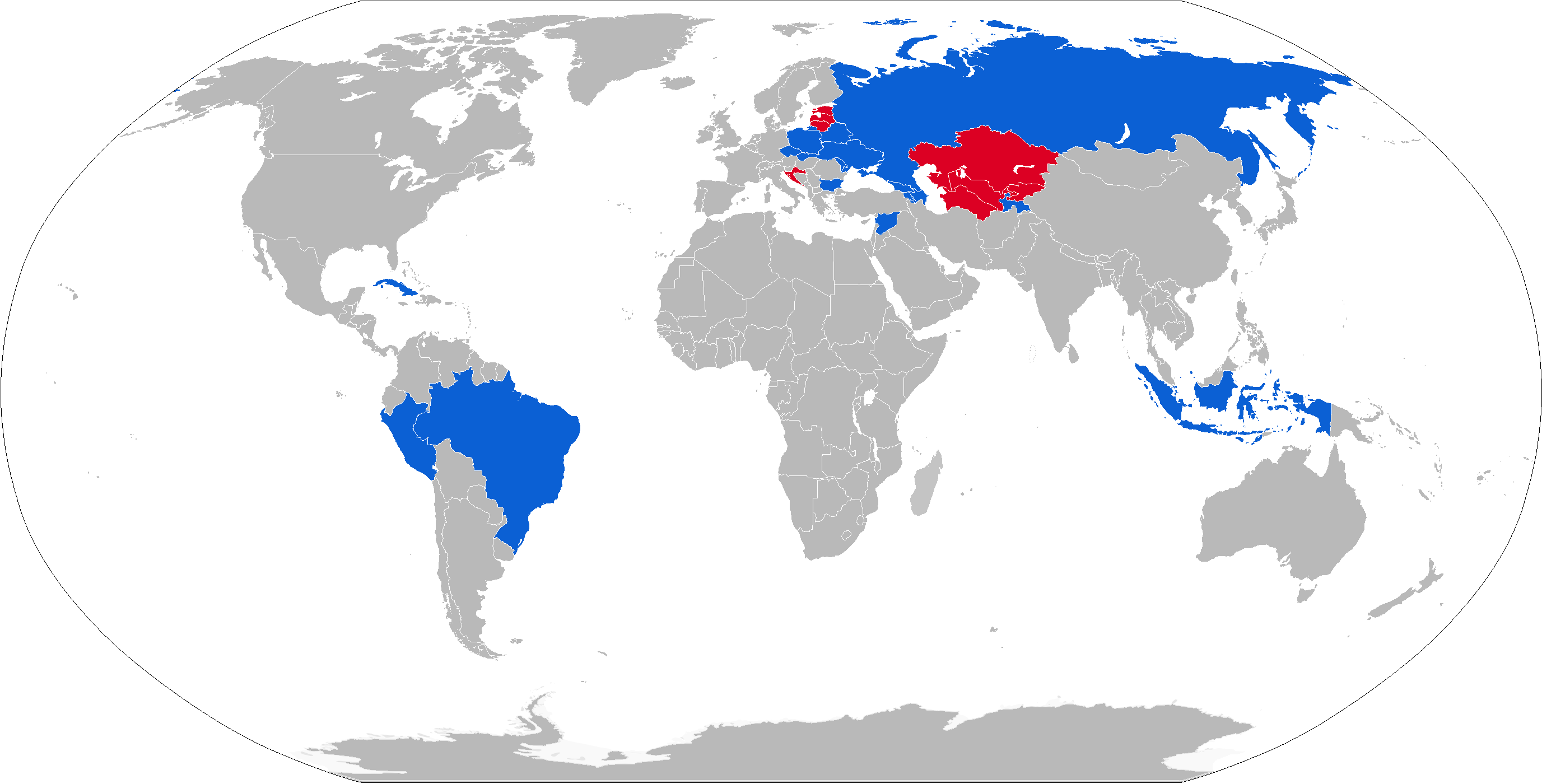
Operators Current Former

=== Current operators ===
- Armenia – 13 9P149 as of 2023.
- Azerbaijan
- Belarus– 85 9P149 as of 2023.
- Hungary – installed on Mi-24 helicopters.
- Iran – installed in Mi-17sh helicopters.
- Iraq - installed in Mi-35M helicopters.
- Indonesia – installed in Mi-35P attack helicopters
- India – Deal for 800 missiles signed in June 2019 at the cost of ₹200 crore (equivalent to ₹249 crore or US$29 million in 2023). Installed on Mi-35 helicopters.
- Kazakhstan – 6 9P149 as of 2023.
- Russia – used by Army units and Marines.
- Serbia
- Turkmenistan – 36 9P149 as of 2023.
- Ukraine (The separatist forces battling the Ukrainian army in the War in Donbas have also been documented to have used the weapon.)

=== Former operators ===
- Brazil – installed on Mi-35M helicopters. Withdrawn from service after the Brazilian Air Force retired its Mi-35 attack helicopters.
- Croatia – obtained with Mi-24 attack helicopters from an unknown supplier and displayed at the Poseidon '94 military exercise. Withdrawn from service.
- Moldova – withdrawn from service.
- Poland – used on Mi-24 and PZL W-3 Sokół helicopters. Retired.
- Soviet Union – passed on to successor states.
