= Boris Shavyrin =

Russian artillery and rocket engineer

Boris Ivanovich Shavyrin (also transliterated as Shavirin, Shavyirin; Russian: Бори́с Ива́нович Шавы́рин) (1902, Yaroslavl – 1965) was a Soviet artillery and rocket engineer who developed the first air-augmented rocket, Gnom, or Gnome (installable on mobile complexes or large tanks), as well as many other Soviet mortars and rockets. He was the first Head and Chief Designer of KB Mashinostroyeniya.

== See also ==
- List of Russian inventors
