= Siling =

Siling may refer to:

- Siling, Guangxi, town in Wuxuan County, Guangxi, China
- Siling Lake in Tibet, China
- Four Holy Beasts (四靈; Sìlíng) of Chinese mythology
- Siling (思陵; Sīlíng; "Si Mausoleum") in Fangshan District, Beijing, China, tomb of Emperor Xizong of Jin
- Siling (思陵; Sīlíng; "Si Mausoleum") in Changping District, Beijing, China, tomb of the Chongzhen Emperor
- Ślęża, less commonly Siling in German, mountain in the Sudeten Foreland, Poland

== See also ==
- Siling labuyo, chili pepper cultivar developed in the Philippines
- Siling haba, chili pepper cultivar developed in the Philippines
- Silingi, ancient Germanic tribe
- Sil (disambiguation)
- Sile (disambiguation)
- Silin (disambiguation)
- Xiling (disambiguation)
