= List of Mil Mi-24 variants =

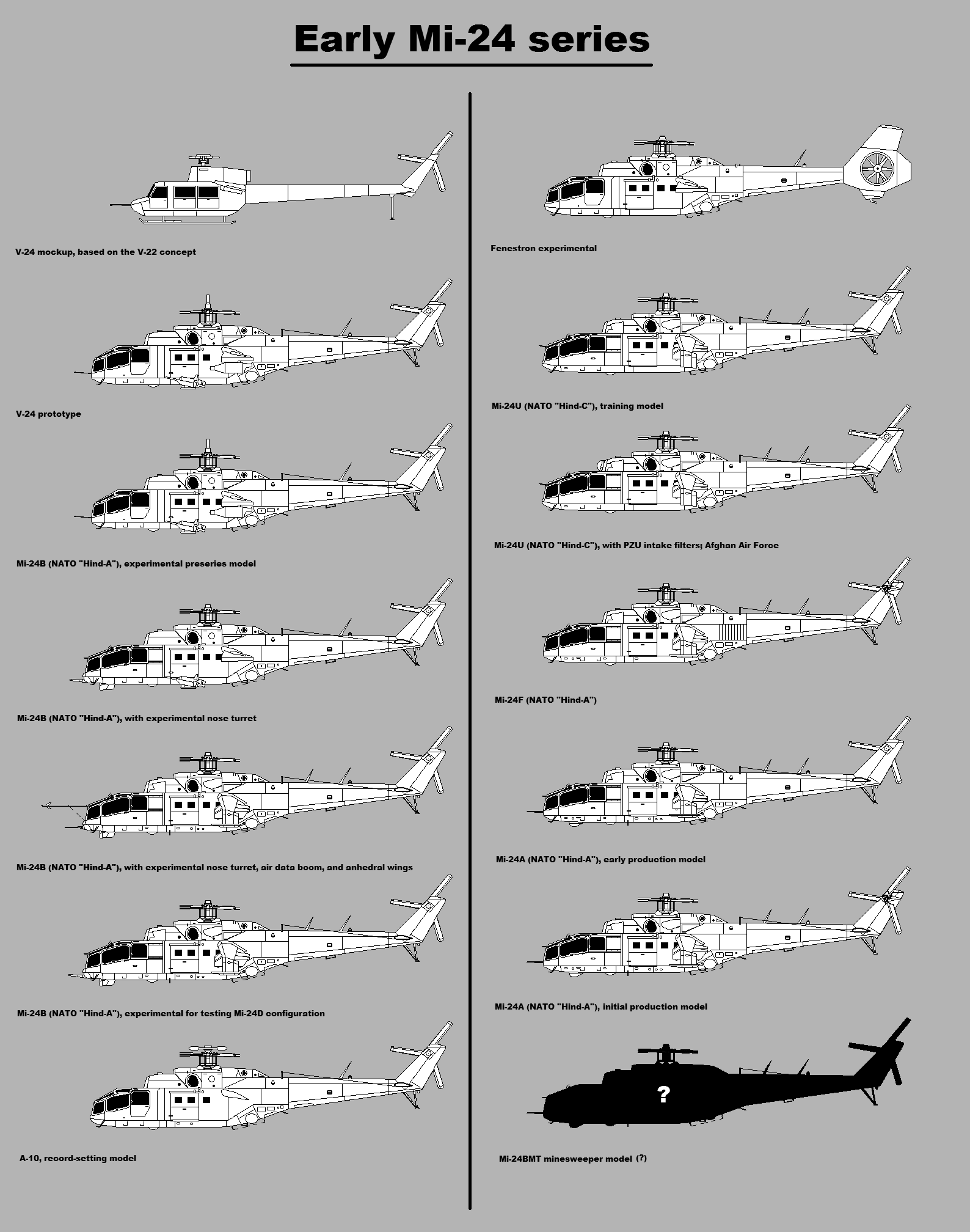
Early Mi-24 series

The Soviet and later Russian Mil Mi-24 helicopter has been produced in many variants, as described below.

== History ==
In 1966, Soviet aircraft designer Mikhail Mil created a mock-up design of a new helicopter (derived from the Mil Mi-8) which was made with the intent of fulfilling both the role of a close air support aircraft as well as being able to transport infantry into combat. This prototype design was designated the V-24, and in 1968 a directive was given to proceed with the development of the helicopter.

The Mi-24 went from the drawing board to the first test-flights in less than eighteen months, with the first models being delivered to the Soviet Armed Forces for evaluation in 1971. As a result of the speedy development, the initial Mi-24 variants had a number of problems: lateral roll, weapon sighting issues, and a limited field of view for the pilot. A later redesign of the Mi-24's front section solved most of these problems.

== List of variants ==
A-10
Designation given to the aircraft used for record breaking from 1975 in the FAI E1 class.
V-24
The first version, twelve prototypes and development aircraft. The first V-24 mockup resembled the Bell UH-1A Huey. Later models resembled the future Hind-A, one of which was modified in 1975 as A-10 for speed record attempts with wings removed and faired over and with inertia-type dampers on the main rotor head. The A-10 reached a speed of 368 km/h (229 mph). It was armed with the GSh-23 autocannon and could carry up to six missiles or rockets.
Mi-24
(Hind-A) An early version of the Mi-24, which could carry eight combat troops and three crew members. It could also carry four 57mm rocket pods on four underwing pylons, four MCLOS 9M17 Fleyta (AT-2 Swatter) anti-tank missiles on two underwing rails, free-fall bombs, plus one Afanasev A-12.7 12.7mm machine-gun in the nose. The Mi-24A was the first production model.
Mi-24B
(Hind-A) Experimental variant of the Hind-A, one of which was used to test the Fenestron tail rotor.
Mi-24F
(Hind-A) Modified Hind-A with seven reinforcing ribs on the port fuselage aft of the wing and the SRO-2M Khrom ("Odd Rods") IFF antenna relocated from the canopy to the oil cooler. The APU exhaust was also extended and angled downwards. The designation may be unofficial.
Mi-24A
(Hind-B) The Mi-24A was the second production model. Both the Mi-24 and Mi-24A entered into Soviet Air Forces service in 1972. It lacked the four-barrel Yak-B 12.7mm machine gun under the nose.
Mi-24U
(Hind-C) Training version without nose gun and wingtip stations.
Mi-24BMT
Small number of Mi-24s converted into minesweepers.
Mi-24D
(Hind-D) The Mi-24D was designed to be a more pure gunship than the earlier variants. It entered production in 1973. The Mi-24D has a redesigned forward fuselage, with two separate cockpits for the pilot and gunner. It is armed with a single 12.7mm four-barrel Yak-B machine-gun under the nose. It can also carry four 57mm rocket pods, four SACLOS 9M17 Phalanga anti-tank missiles (a significant enhancement compared to the MCLOS system found on the Mi-24A), plus bombs and other weapons. One Mi-24D was sold to Poland in January 1996 and was used by the WTD 61 in Manching during 1994 for tests with the head of a MIM-23 Hawk missile in place of the chin-mounted gun. This version also had an unidentified modification in the rear cabin window on the starboard side. The per-unit cost is around $36 million USD.
Mi-24PTRK
Modification of the Mi-24D that was used for testing the Shturm V missile system for the Mi-24V.
Mi-24DU
A small number of Mi-24Ds were built as training helicopters with doubled controls.
Mi-24V
(Hind-E) Later development which entered production in 1976. It was armed with the more advanced 9M114 Shturm (AT-6 Spiral). Eight of these missiles are mounted on four outer wing pylons. It was the most widely produced version with more than 1,500 made. In Polish service this aircraft is designated Mi-24W. One Mi-24V was referred to as Mi-24T for unknown reasons.
Arsenal Mi-24V upgrade
Ukrainian upgrade for Mi-24V.
Mi-24P
(Hind-F) The gunship version, which replaced the 12.7mm machine-gun with a fixed side-mounted 30mm GSh-30-2K twin-barrel autocannon. Entered production in 1981.
Mi-24TECh-24
Experimental Mi-24P to test abilities for recovery of downed aircraft.
Mi-24VP
(Hind-E Mod) Development of Mi-24V made in 1985 which replaced the machine-gun with GSh-23 in a movable turret. Entered service in 1989, but only 25 were made before production ended the same year. One Mi-24VP flew with the Delta-H tail rotor of the Mil Mi-28.
Mi-24VU
(Hind-E) Indian training version of Mi-24V.
Mi-24VD
A version produced in 1985 to test a rear defensive gun.
Mi-24RKhR
(Hind-G1) NBC reconnaissance model, which is designed to collect radiation, biological and chemical samples. First prototype flight was in 1978. It first came to wider public attention during the 1986 Chernobyl disaster. Also known as the Mi-24R, Mi-24RK and Mi-24RKh (Rch).
Mi-24RA
(Hind-G1 Mod) New version of the Mi-24V.
Mi-24RR
Radiation reconnaissance model derived from the Mi-24R.
Mi-24K
(Hind-G2) Army reconnaissance, artillery observation helicopter.
Mi-24M
Proposed naval version, unbuilt.
Mi-24VM
Upgraded Mi-24V with updated avionics to improve night-time operation, new communications gear, shorter and lighter wings, and updated weapon systems to include support for the 9M120 Ataka and Shturm ATGMs, 9K38 Igla [Air-to-air missile AAMs] and a 23mm main gun. Other internal changes have been made to increase the aircraft life-cycle and ease maintenance.
Mi-24VN
(Hind-E) A night-attack version based on an Mi-24V in Mi-24VM Stage 1 configuration.
Mi-24PM
Upgraded Mi-24P using same technologies as in Mi-24VM. Currently delivered to the RuAF.
Mi-24PN
A version of the Mi-24P with a TV and a FLIR camera located in a dome on the front of the aircraft, and is armed with the GSh-23. The Russian Air Force received 14 Mi-24PNs in 2004.
Mi-24PS
Civil police or paramilitary version, equipped with a FLIR, searchlight, loudspeaker PA system and attachments for rappelling ropes.
Mi-24V Ecological Survey Version
Environmental research modification developed by the Polyot Industrial Research Organisation.
Mi-24 SuperHind Mk.II
Modern western avionics upgrade produced by South African company Advanced Technologies and Engineering (ATE). Prototypes converted from Mi-24R models, and one Mi-24P was used to test sighting system.
Mi-24 SuperHind Mk.III
Extensive operational upgrade of the original Mi-24 including weapons, avionics and counter measures.
Mi-24 SuperHind Mk.IV
Upgraded Mk. III version with Pall vortex engine air particle separator system over the engine intakes.
Mi-24 SuperHind Mk.V
Newest version of the "SuperHind" with fully redesigned front fuselage and cockpit. Mock-up only.
Mi-24 Afghanistan field modifications
Passenger compartment armour and exhaust suppressors were often removed. Extra rounds for the rocket pods to allow self-reloading near the battlefield and also heavy weapons for self-defense were often carried.
Tamam Mi-24 HMOSP
Israeli upgrade.
Mi-24P-1M
Latest modernization of Mi-24P helicopters, fitted with a new modular direct infrared countermeasures system, autopilot, improved power supply unit and OPS-24N-1L navigation and targeting station. It has also an option for an active electronically scanned array (AESA) radar. First unveiled at 2019 MAKS International Aviation and Space Salon.
Mi-25
The export version of the Mi-24D.

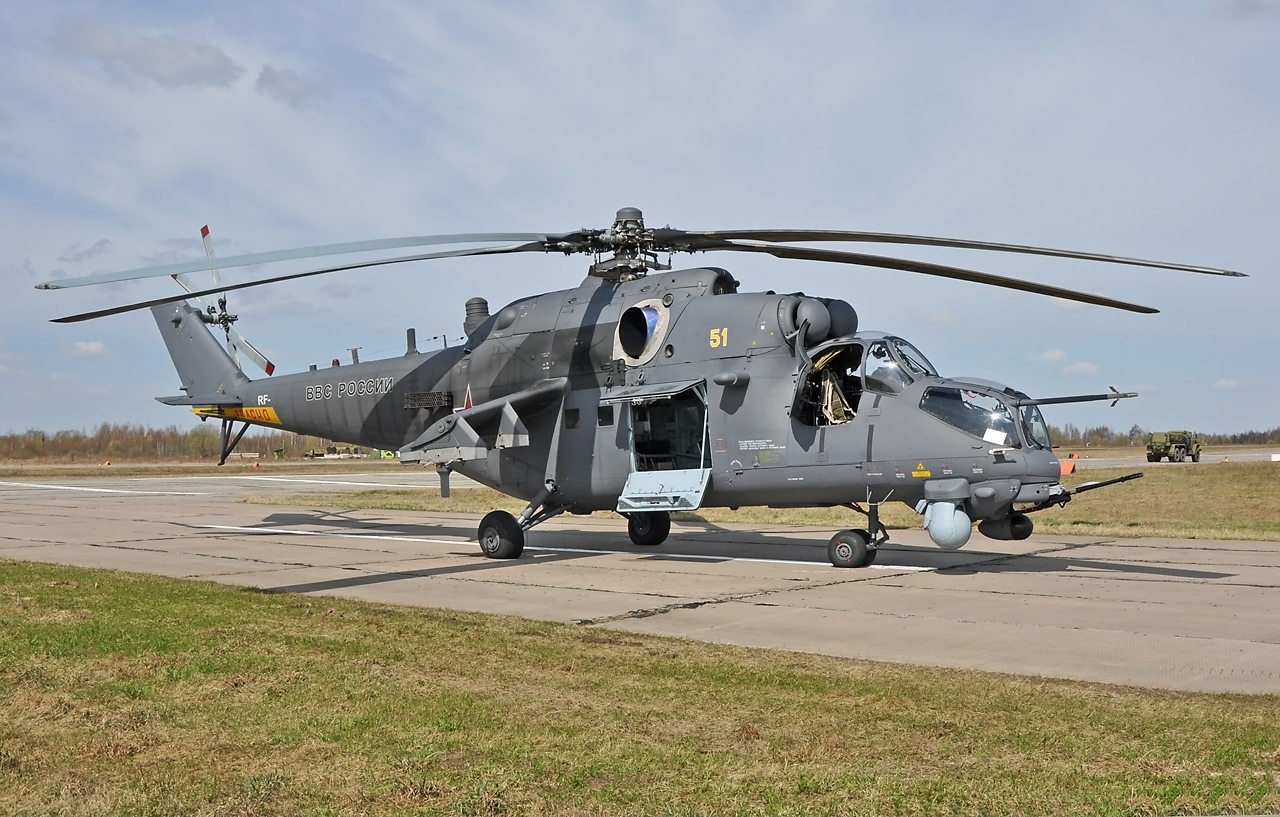
Mil Mi-35M

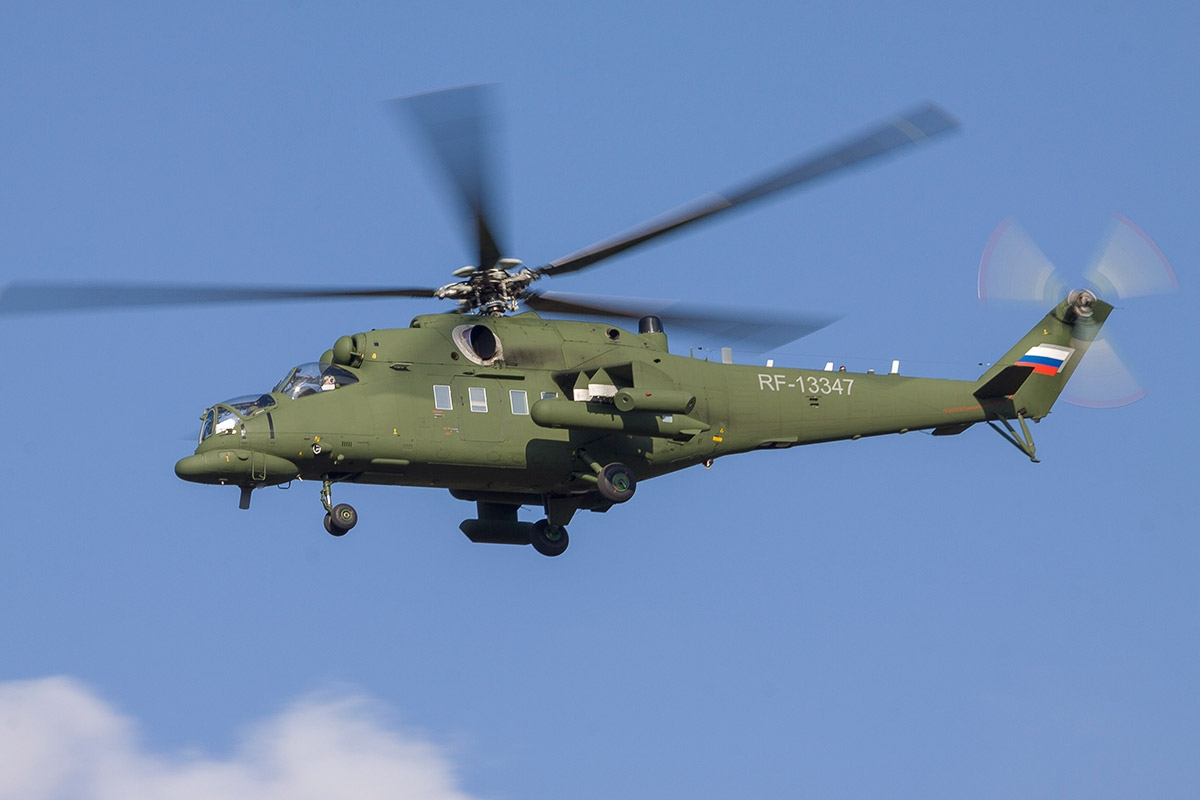
Mil Mi-35MS

Mi-35
(Monsoon) The export version of the Mi-24V.
Mi-35M
Night attack version fitted with upgraded advanced avionics and sensor package, including night vision systems, GOES-342 electro-optical range finder/targeting system, GLONASS/GPS navigation system, electronic multifunction displays, onboard computer, and jam-proof communications equipment. Also known as Mi-35M1. More than 60 are in service with the Russian Air Force and it has also been exported. By September 2018, all Russian Air Force's Mi-35Ms were equipped with Vitebsk onboard defense system.
Mi-35MS
Flying Command Post variant of the Mi-35M. Operated by the Russian Federal Protective Service (FSO).
Mi-35M2
Updated version of the Mi-35M for the Venezuelan Army.
Mi-35M3
Export variant of the Mi-24VM.
Mi-35M4
(AH-2 Sabre) Updated version of the Mi-35M with Israeli avionics for the Brazilian Air Force.
Mi-35P
The export version of the Mi-24P.
Mi-35P Phoenix
Russian Helicopters holding has developed a common standard for Mi-24 modernization designated as Mi-35P. The Mi-35P has received the OPS-24N-1L observation-sight system with a third generation long-wave matrix thermal imager, TV camera, and laser rangefinder. The upgraded gunship’s cockpit has the KNEI-24E-1 flight navigation system with multifunctional displays. The PKV-8-35 digital flight system increases the helicopter’s manoeuvrability and steadiness. The modernised gunship is also fitted with the updated PrVK-24-2 targeting system, which allows the use of 9M127-1 Ataka-VM anti-tank guided missiles and either L370 Vitebsk electronic countermeasure system or its export version President-S. The helicopter has also received a chin-mounted NPPU-23 turret with a twin-barrel GSh-23L autocannon. Serial production has started as of August 2020 for an export customer. It is also known under nickname Phoenix.
Czech Mi-35 modernization
Between 2003-2005 Mi-35s were manufactured for the Czech Air Force with the following modifications: TV3-117VMA engines, EVU engine exhaust gas cooling system, cabin and exterior light modifications for use of night vision system including custom night vision scopes, GPS satellite navigation system (Garmin-155 XL type), backup artificial horizon (type LUN 1241 of Czech manufacture), VARTA batteries, civil identification system transponder (IFF), which allows flights over the territory of the Czech Republic without restrictions, new elements for signalling and recording of flight parameters, altimeter calibrated in feet. Later modernization (~2017) included stabilized platform with FLIR night vision optoelectronic system, multi-function displays including moving map system, upgraded communication and navigation equipment, incorporation of a friend/foe aircraft identification system (IFF), camouflage in accordance with the standards of the Army and NATO, planning and combat support system. These helicopters were donated to Ukraine in summer 2023.
Mi-35U
Unarmed training version of the Mi-35.
Mi-PSV
Experimental high-speed helicopter based on the Mi-24. PSV stands for Perspektivny skorostnoi vertolet (Перспективный скоростной вертолёт) – Prospective high speed helicopter). Single-seat streamlined cockpit, unarmed, fitted with experimental main rotors for research into high-speed flight, with a target of increasing the speed of the Mi-28N by 10% and the Mi-35M by 13%. A Mi-24LL PSV demonstrator flew at a level flight speed of "greater than 405 km/h (219 kn)", higher than of the 401 km/h (217 kn) official record by Lynx in 1986. The mockup was first shown at the 2015 MAKS International Aviation and Space Salon. In April 2017, the Mi-PSV made first flights equipped with large low mounted wings, mounted nearly at the level of its belly in front of the main landing gear. The normal smaller "Mi-24 wings" at the height of the cabin roof are removed.

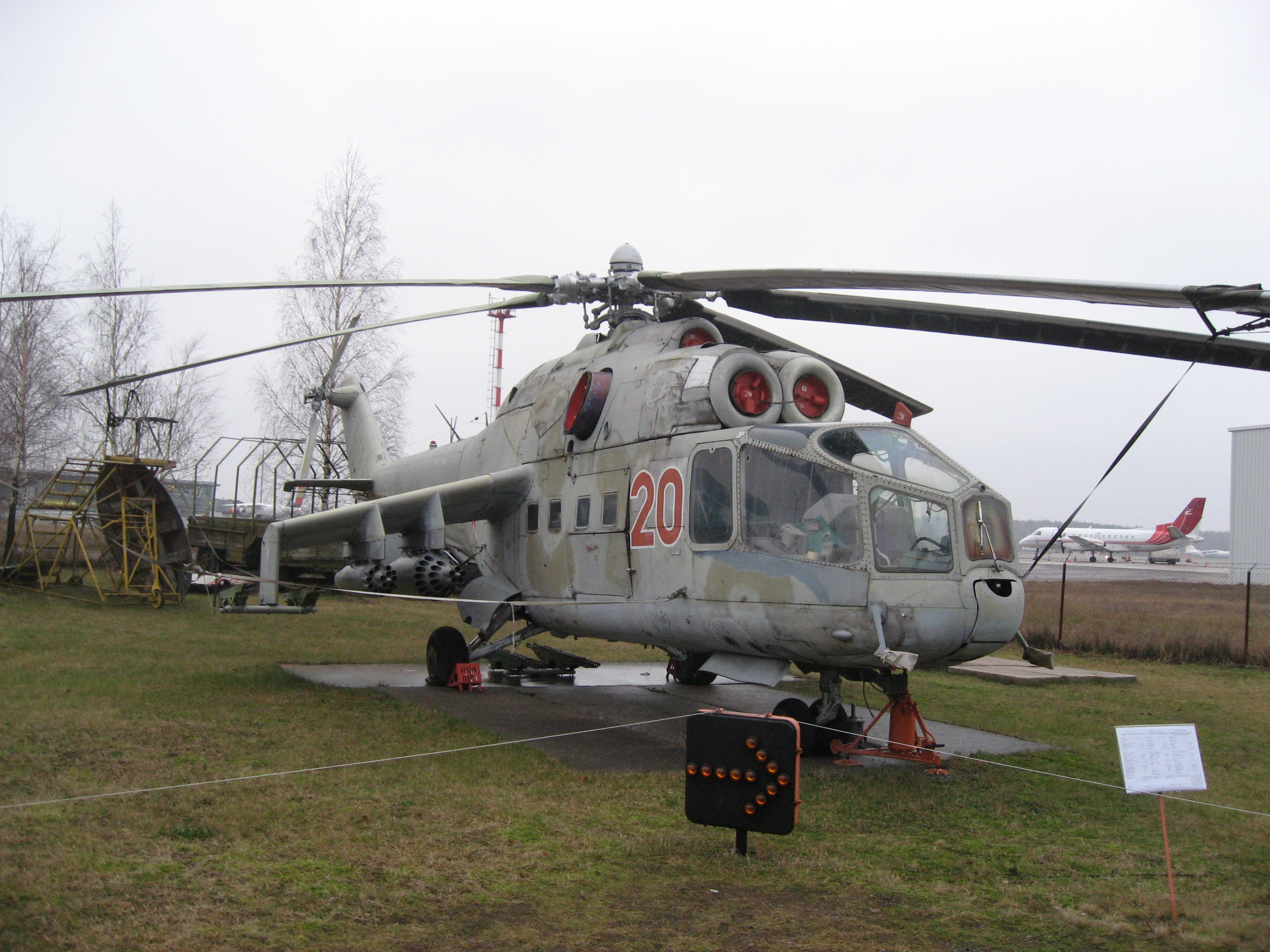
Mi-24A

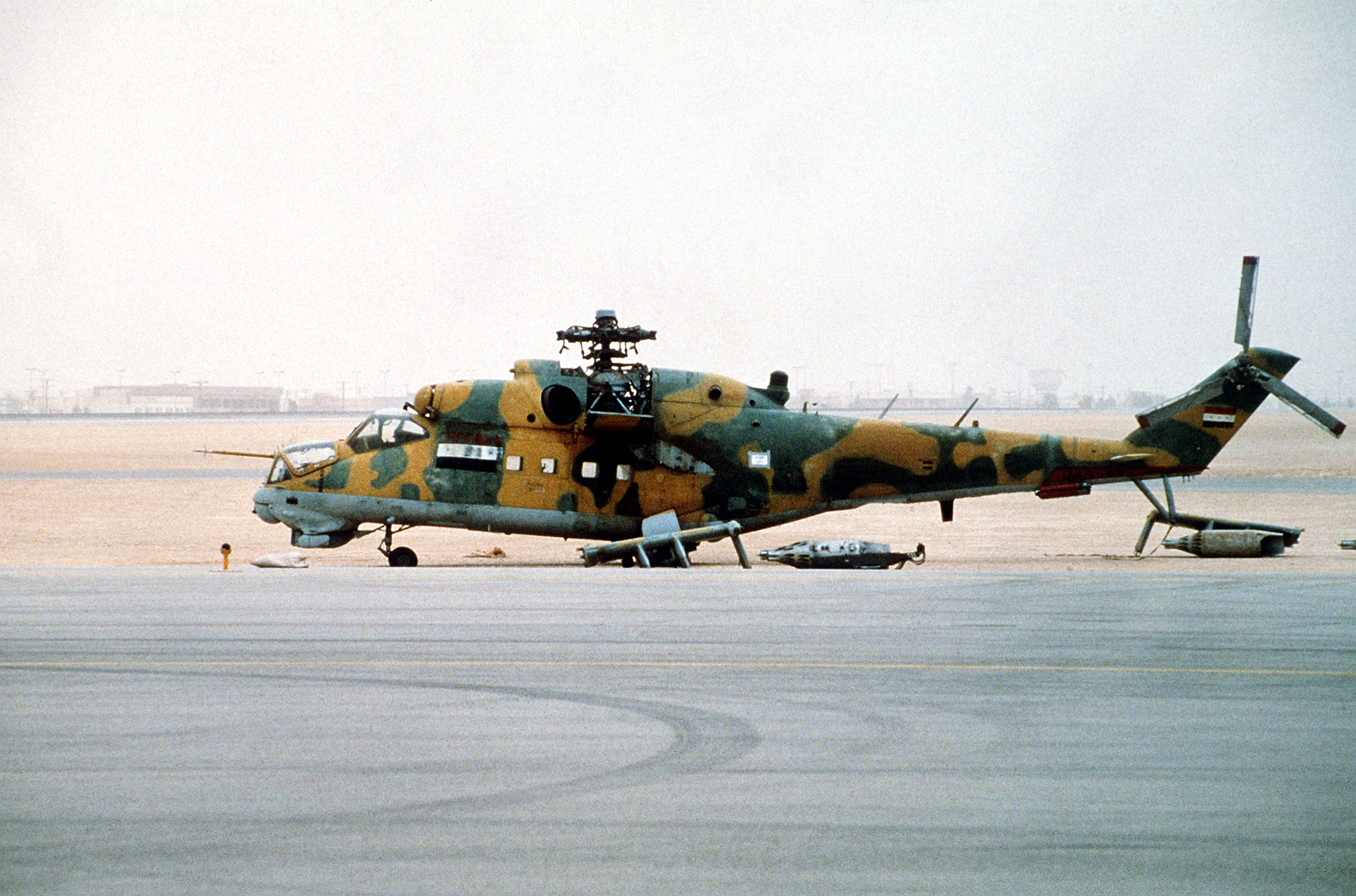
Iraqi Mi-24D captured during the Gulf War

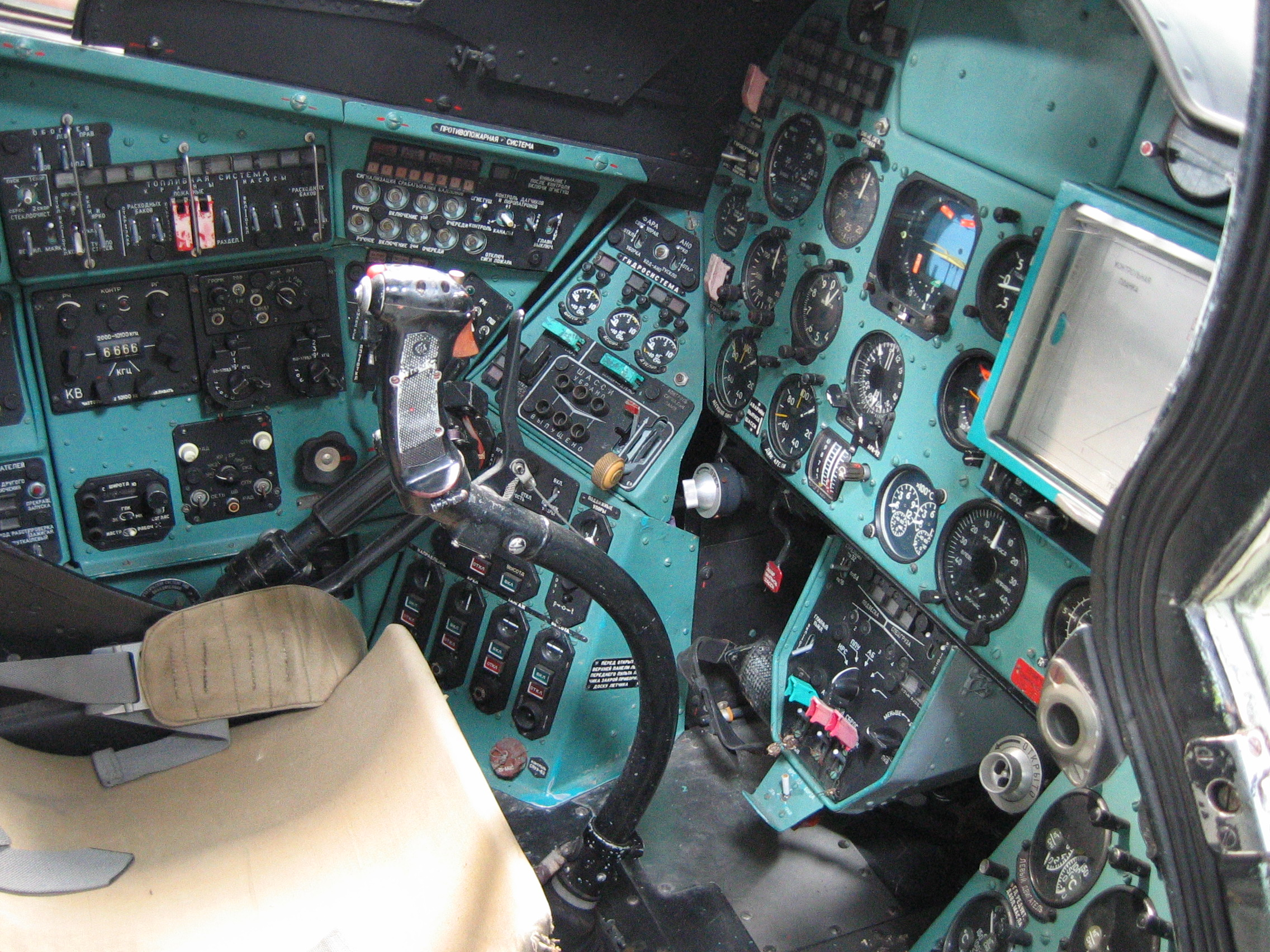
Mi-24D cockpit

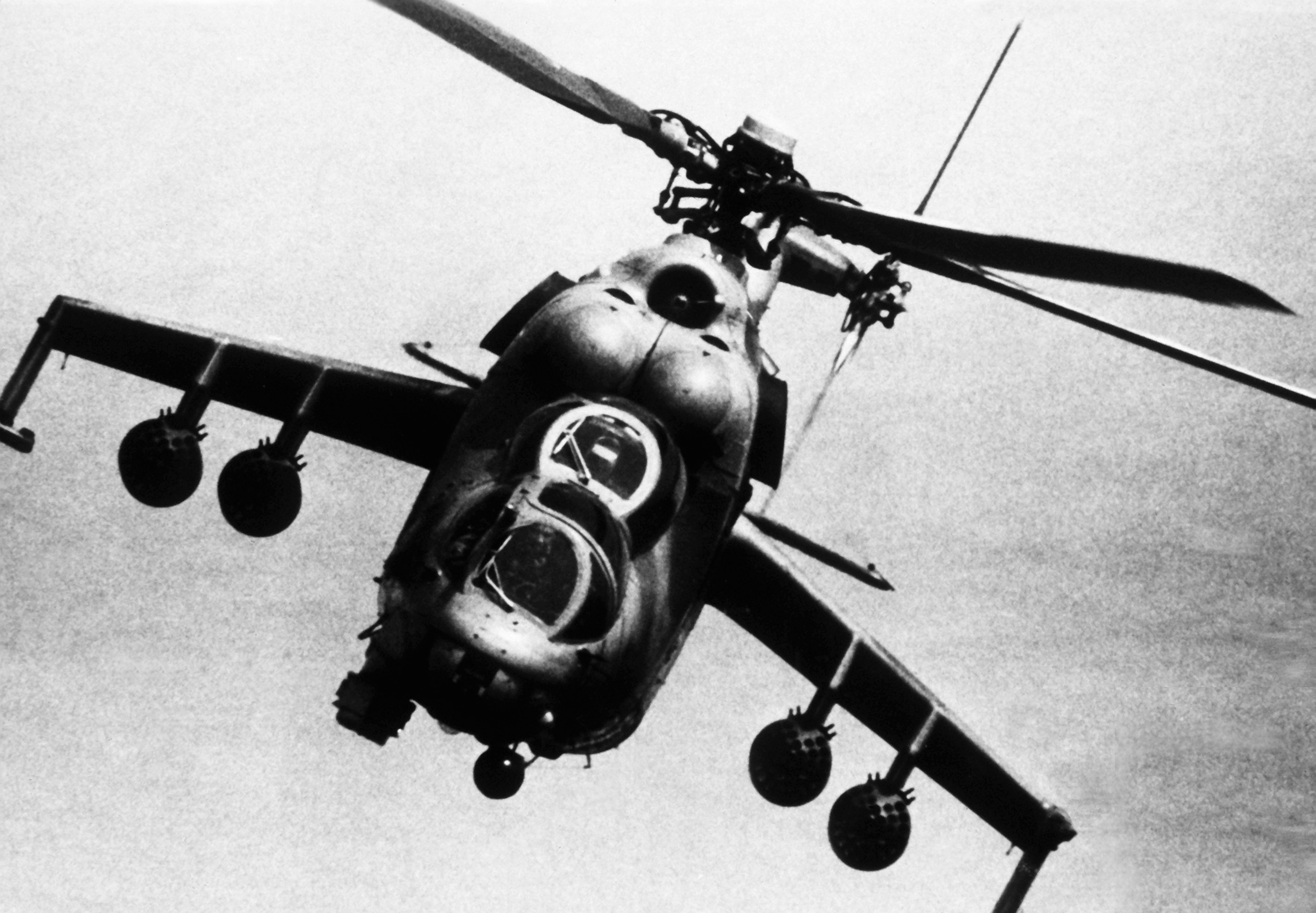
Mi-24V of the Soviet Air Forces

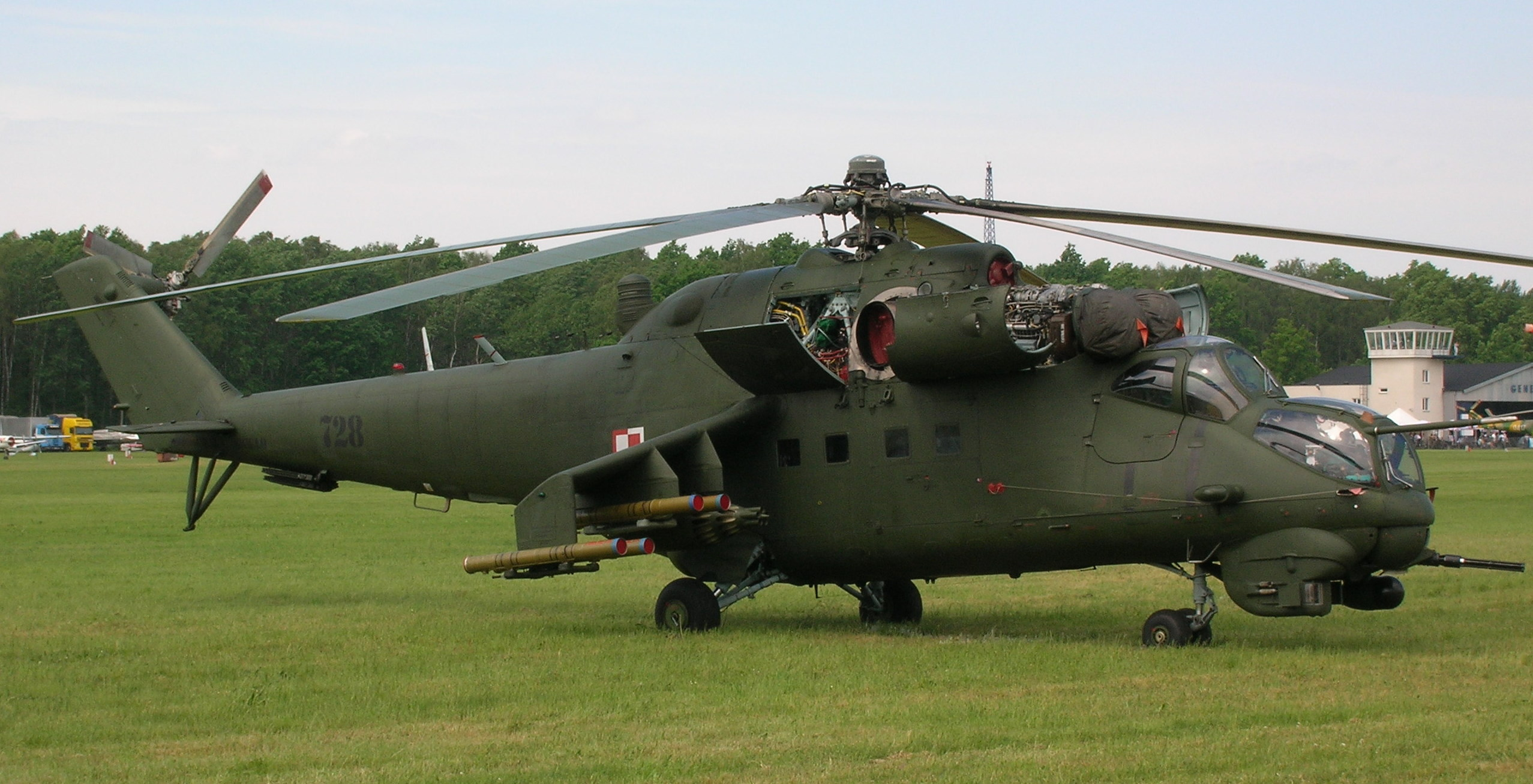
Mi-24W(V) of the Polish Air Force

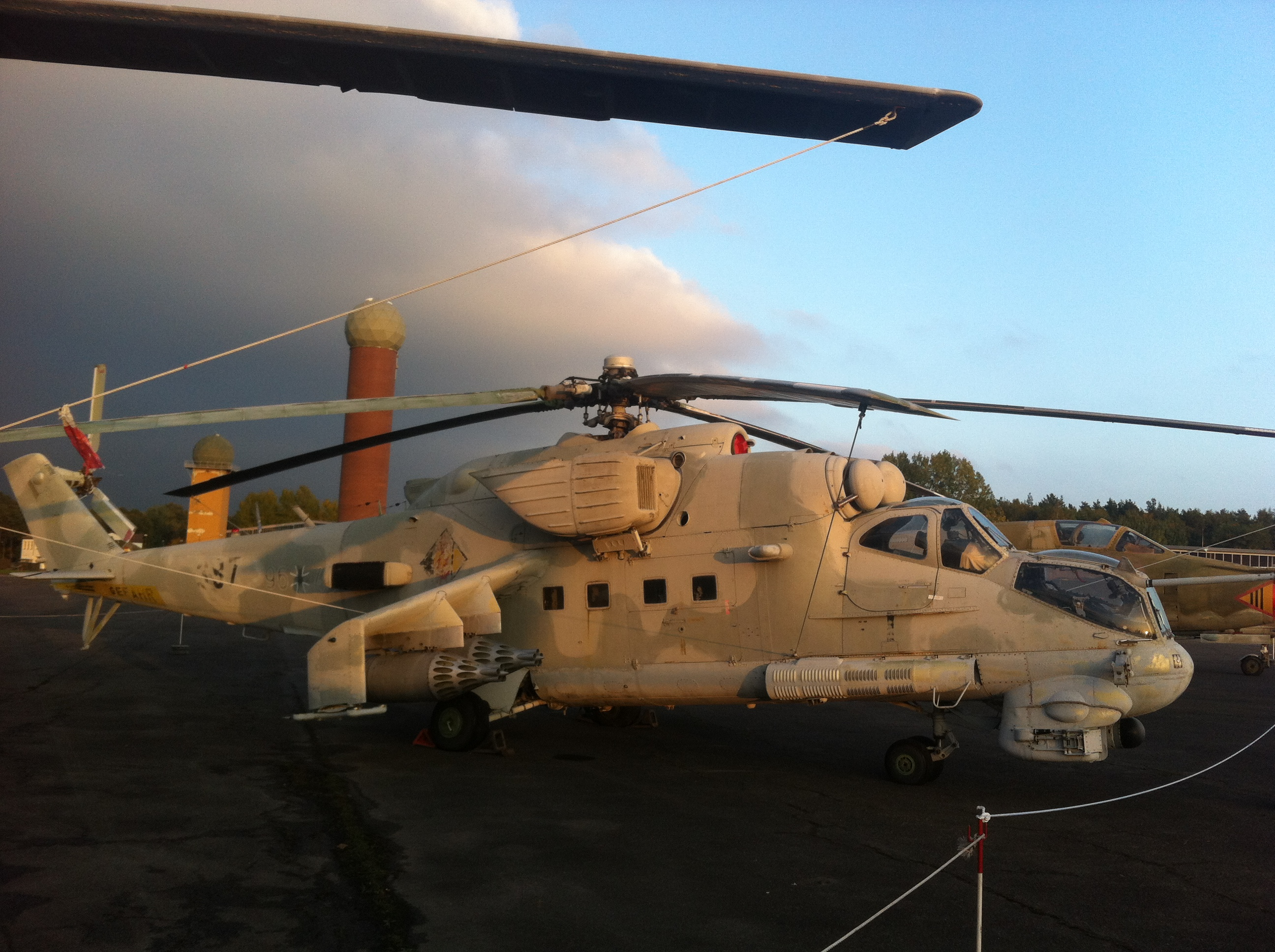
Mi-24P of the East German Air Force

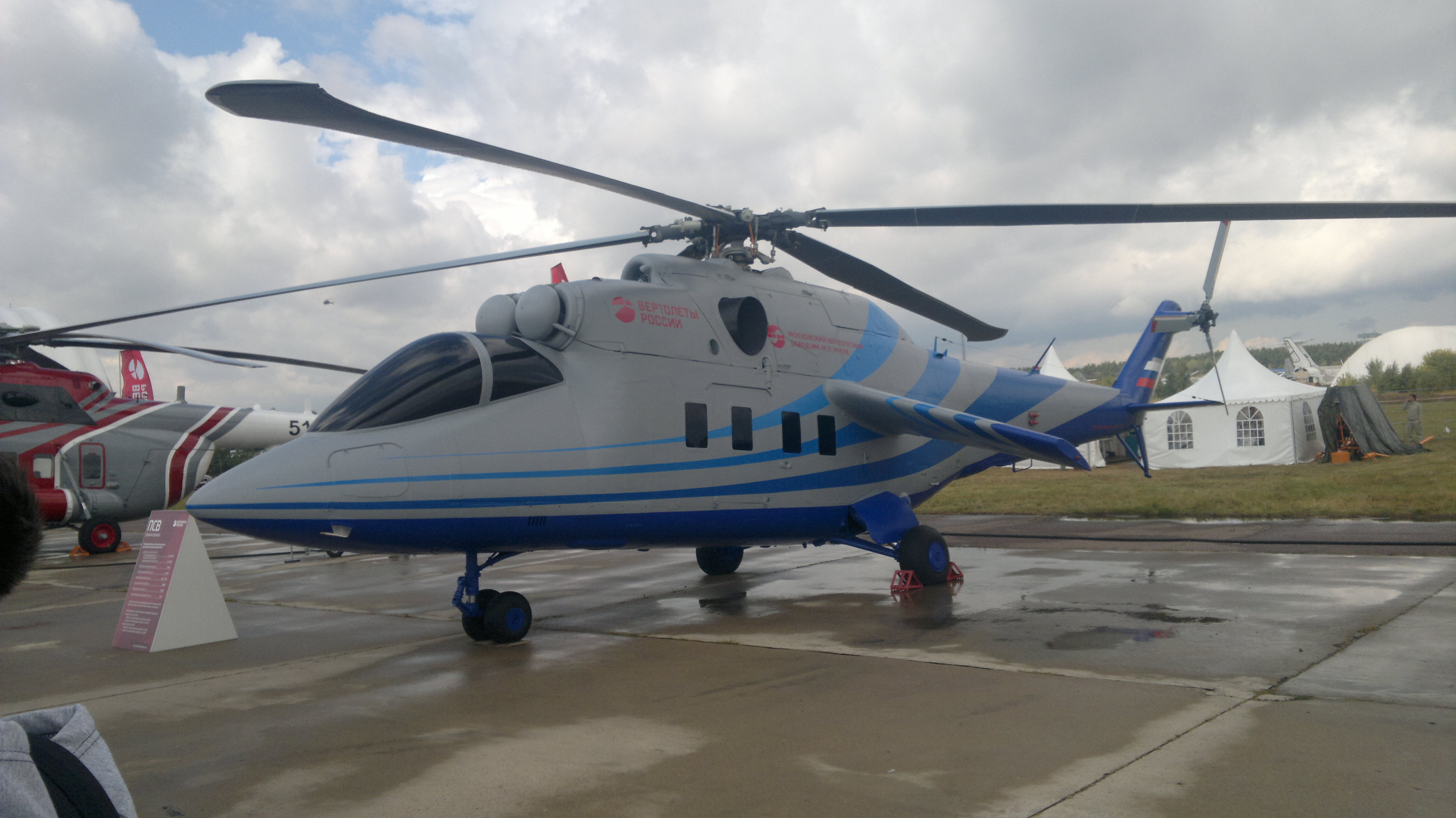
Mi-PSV at MAKS 2015
