= CILS =

CILS may refer to:

- Center for Informal Learning and Schools
- Center for International Legal Studies, an Austrian law institute
- Certificazione di Italiano come Lingua Straniera, a test of Italian as a foreign or second language
- Children of Immigrants Longitudinal Study, a study of immigrants in the United States
- CILS-FM, a Canadian radio station

== See also ==
- CIL (disambiguation)
