= SIL =

SIL, Sil and sil may refer to:

== Organizations ==
- Servis Industries Limited, Pakistan
- Smithsonian Institution Libraries
- SIL International, formerly Summer Institute of Linguistics
- Apex Silver Mines (former American Stock Exchange ticker symbol)
- Societas Internationalis Limnologiae, now International Society of Limnology
- Society for Individual Liberty
- Scooters India Limited

== Science and technology ==
- Solid immersion lens, for microscope
- Standard Interchange Language, for information exchange between software
- Software-in-the-Loop, in software testing; see Association for Standardisation of Automation and Measuring Systems
- STIL or SIL, a human gene
- Surge impedance loading, of electrical transmission lines
- Squamous intraepithelial lesion
- Safety Integrity Level, of a safety function
- Speech Interference Level, an acoustical parameter
- SIL Open Font License

== Fiction ==
- Sil (Doctor Who), a villain in the TV series
- Sil, a character in the film Species
- Silvio Dante, a character in The Sopranos

== People ==
- Narasingha Sil (born 1937), historian
- Sil Campusano (born 1965), a former baseball player
- Sil Austin (1929–2001), American jazz saxophonist
- Sil, member of the Dutch rap-metal band Urban Dance Squad
- Silvy De Bie or Sil (born 1981), Belgian singer
- Sil, project name of Dutch house musician Olav Basoski (born 1968)

== Places ==
- Sil (river), Galicia, Spain
- Sile (river), Italy, also called Sil
- Sil (village), a small village on the northwestern part of Soledar, Ukraine

== Transport ==
- South Island line, Hong Kong

== Other uses ==
- Sierra Leone, UNDP country code
- Tumulung Sisaala (ISO 639-3 language code), a language
- Silence-Lotto (UCI code), a bicycle racing team
- SIL code, a 3-letter language code used by SIL International
- sister-in-law

== See also ==
- Sill (disambiguation)
- Sils (disambiguation)
- CIL (disambiguation)
