= Sils Lake =

Sils Lake may refer to:

- Lake Sils in the Upper Engadine valley, Grisons, Switzerland
- Lake Sils, an ancient lake located in Catalonia, Spain
