= Silin (surname) =

Silin (Russian: Силин) is a Russian masculine surname, its feminine counterpart is Silina. Notable people with the surname include:

- Egor Silin (born 1988), Russian cyclist
- Evelyn Šilina (born 2001), Estonian footballer
- Marie Silin (born 1979), French politician
- Roman Silin (born 1973), Russian politician
- Tīna Siliņa (born 1995), Latvian curler
- Vyacheslav Ivanovich Silin, Russian firearms designer
- Yelena Silina (b. 1987), Russian ice hockey player
