= Sils =

Sils or SILS may refer to:

== Places ==
- Sils, Girona, a municipality in the comarca of Selva in Catalonia, Spain
  - Lake Sils (Catalonia), an ancient lake near Sils, Catalonia, Spain
  - Lake Sils, a lake in the Upper Engadine in the Grisons, Switzerland

== Other ==
- Single Incision Laparoscopic Surgery
- UMass SILS, the Summer Institute in Leadership in Sustainability at the University of Massachusetts Amherst
