= Silin =

Silin may also refer to:

- Silin, Poland, a village in Poland.
- Silin (surname), a Russian surname
- Saint Silin or Sulien, Welsh saint
- Silin Dam, a dam in Guizhou Province, China
- Silin gun, a Russian machine gun
