= Albert Dalmau =

Spanish footballer (born 1992)

Personal information
- Full name: Albert Dalmau Martínez
- Date of birth: 16 March 1992 (age 34)
- Place of birth: Sils, Spain
- Height: 1.75 m (5 ft 9 in)
- Position: Right-back

Youth career
- 2000–2002: Sils
- 2002–2005: Girona
- 2005–2011: Barcelona

Senior career*
Years	Team	Apps	(Gls)
2010–2011	Barcelona B	3	(0)
2011–2013	Valencia B	47	(1)
2013–2014	Cádiz	14	(1)
2014–2015	Lugo	23	(0)
2015–2016	Córdoba	8	(0)
2016–2017	Hércules	38	(2)
2017	Levante B	8	(0)
2018	Sepsi OSK	16	(0)
2018–2019	Lleida Esportiu	30	(0)
2019	Llagostera	9	(0)
2020	Horta	5	(0)
2021–2022	Peralada	21	(0)
Total		222	(4)

International career
2008	Spain U16	3	(0)
2008–2009	Spain U17	23	(0)
2010	Spain U19	2	(0)
- * Club domestic league appearances and goals

Albert Dalmau Martínez (born 16 March 1992) is a Spanish former professional footballer who played as a right-back.

== Club career ==
Born in Sils, Girona, Catalonia, Dalmau started playing football for his hometown club, moving to FC Barcelona's youth system La Masia at the age of 13. Still a junior, on 18 April 2010, he made his senior debut with the reserves in the Segunda División B, starting against UE Lleida in a 2–0 home win; they returned to Segunda División after an 11-year absence.

In the following seasons, Dalmau alternated between the second and third tiers, representing Valencia CF Mestalla, Cádiz CF, CD Lugo, Córdoba CF and Hércules CF. In October 2017, he signed with Levante UD to bolster the B side following Iván López's severe knee injury, but was released shortly after in order to move to Romanian team Sepsi OSK Sfântu Gheorghe.

On 3 August 2018, Dalmau agreed to a two-year contract at Lleida Esportiu.

== Career statistics ==
As of match played on 24 May 2018

Club	Season	League			Cup		Other		Total	
Club	Season	Division	Apps	Goals	Apps	Goals	Apps	Goals	Apps	Goals
Barcelona B	2009–10	Segunda División B	1	0	—		—		1	0
Barcelona B	2010–11	Segunda División	2	0	—		—		2	0
Barcelona B	Total		3	0	—		—		3	0
Valencia B	2011–12	Segunda División B	15	0	—		—		15	0
Valencia B	2012–13	Segunda División B	32	1	—		—		32	1
Valencia B	Total		47	1	—		—		47	1
Cádiz	2013–14	Segunda División B	14	1	0	0	—		14	1
Lugo	2014–15	Segunda División	23	0	1	0	—		24	0
Córdoba	2015–16	Segunda División	8	0	1	0	0	0	9	0
Hércules	2016–17	Segunda División	38	2	5	0	—		43	2
Sepsi OSK	2017–18	Liga I	14	0	0	0	—		14	0
Career total			147	4	7	0	0	0	154	4

== Honours ==
Spain U17

- FIFA U-17 World Cup third place: 2009
