= Gast gun =

German twin barrelled machine gun

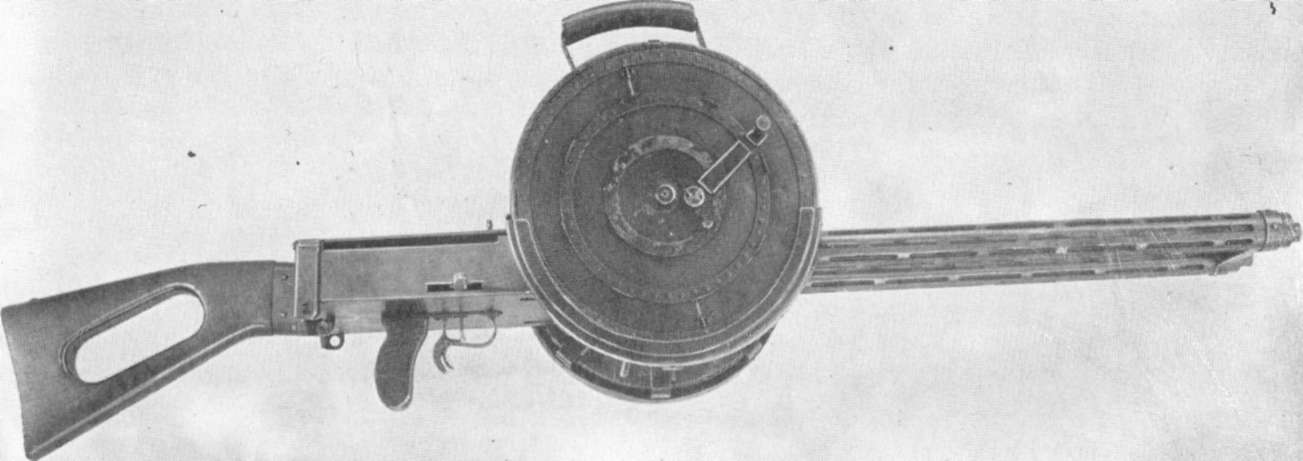
- Loaded Gast machine gun, with drum magazines
- Type: Machine gun
- Place of origin: German Empire

Service history
- Used by: German Empire
- Wars: World War I

Production history
- Produced: 1916

Specifications
- Mass: 27 kg (60 lb) (without ammunition)
- Cartridge: 7.92×57mm Mauser
- Caliber: 7.92 mm
- Barrels: 2
- Action: Recoil
- Rate of fire: 1,600 round/min
- Muzzle velocity: 930 metres per second (3,100 ft/s)
- Effective firing range: 1,800 m (2,000 yd)
- Feed system: Drum magazine

The Gast gun was a German twin barrelled machine gun that was developed by Karl Gast of Vorwerk und Companie of Barmen and used during the First World War. Its unique operating system produced a very high rate of fire of 1,600 rounds per minute. The same principle was later used as the basis for the widely used Gryazev-Shipunov GSh-23L series of Russian aircraft autocannon.

== Description ==
The weapon combines two barrels into a single mechanism so that the recoil from firing one barrel loads and charges the second. Ammunition feeds into the gun from two vertically mounted cylindrical drums, one on each side. The drums held 180 rounds of German 7.92 mm rifle ammunition, feeding them into the breech using a compressed spring. An experienced gunner could change ammunition drums in a few seconds. The weapon could fire single shots if one side of the mechanism had a problem.

The gun's relative lightness at approximately 27 kg (60 lb) without ammunition led to its airborne use; a telescopic sight was mounted between the two barrels. Its simple design eased maintenance and enabled it to be field stripped in one minute.

== History ==
In January 1915, Karl Gast invented the gun, which would become known as the Gast Maschinengewehr Modell 1917, while working for the Vorwerk company, the first weapon was produced in January 1916. Gast took out patents on 21 January 1916 and 13 February 1917, describing his weapon as "a double-barreled machine gun with recoiling barrels". Rates of fire of 1,600 rounds per minute were achieved during trials.

In August 1917, Gast's demonstration so impressed ordnance experts that a production order for 3,000 guns, along with spare parts and ten ammunition drums for each gun, was awarded to Vorwerk und Companie at a unit price of 6,800 marks each. Delivery of the first 100 guns was promised for 1 June 1918, with production increasing to 500 guns per month by September 1918. Production of the weapon exceeded these initial projections, and the weapons were favorably received with promises of an order for a further 6,000 guns being made in September 1918.

A version of the gun in 13 mm (13.2×92mmSR), the Gast-Flieger MG, was also under development, which used the same ammunition as the Maxim MG TuF and had two, curved, box magazines.

The gun was rarely used in service, and its existence was kept secret until three years after the Armistice; in 1921 the Allied Control Commission finally became aware of the Gast gun when a cache of 25 of the guns, ammunition, and designs was found near Königsberg. Gast had applied for a US patent in 1920, which was issued in 1923. A Gast gun was evaluated by the US Army and found to be reliable and mechanically practical. However it was not felt to offer a sufficient advantage over existing machine guns to justify the expense of producing the weapon.

Years later the Gast design was copied by Soviet engineers seeking to improve firing rates of their aircraft autocannon without resorting to the Gatling gun concept or powered revolver cannon. Previous efforts either had relatively poor rates of fire, or used gas operated revolvers, neither of which proved entirely satisfactory. The Gast concept was adopted for the Gryazev-Shipunov GSh-23, which quickly replaced many previous designs. It was also used in the larger 30 mm version, the Gryazev-Shipunov GSh-30-2.

== General references ==
- Chinn, George M. (1951). The Machine Gun: History, Evolution, and Development of Manual, Automatic, and Airborne Repeating Weapons. Bureau of Ordnance.
- Woodman, Harry (1989). Early Aircraft Armament: The Aeroplane and the Gun Up to 1918. Smithsonian Institution Press. p. 138. ISBN 0-87474-994-8.
