= Gryazev-Shipunov GSh-30-2 =

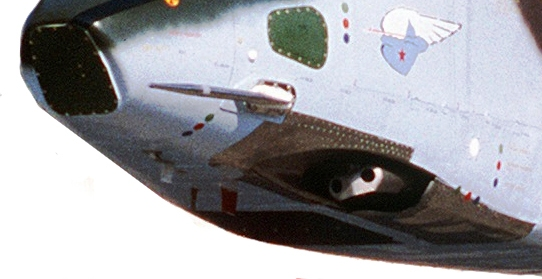
- GSh-30-2 on a Sukhoi Su-25
- Type: Dual-barrel aircraft autocannon

Service history
- In service: 1981–present

Production history
- Designer: KBP
- Manufacturer: KBP

Specifications
- Mass: GSh-30-2: 105 kilograms (231 lb); GSh-30-2k: 126 kilograms (278 lb)
- Length: GSh-30-2: 2,044 millimetres (6.706 ft); GSh-30-2k: 2,944 millimetres (9.659 ft)
- Barrel length: GSh-30-2: 1,500 millimetres (4.9 ft); GSh-30-2k: 2,400 millimetres (7.9 ft)
- Shell: 30×165mm
- Caliber: 30mm
- Barrels: 2
- Action: Gast principle
- Rate of fire: 1,000-3,000 rpm
- Muzzle velocity: 870 m/s (2,850 ft/s)
- Maximum firing range: ~1,800m

The Gryazev-Shipunov GSh-30-2 (Russian: ГШ-30-2) or GSh-2-30 is a Soviet dual-barrel autocannon developed for use on certain ground attack military aircraft and helicopters.

The cannon is not related to the Gryazev-Shipunov GSh-30-1, but is a recoil-operated cannon using the Gast principle, like the Gryazev-Shipunov GSh-23L.

The GSh-30-2 was designed for the Sukhoi Su-25 ground attack plane, it can also be carried in external gun pods and mounted on the Pakistani-Chinese JF-17 Thunder. It measures 2,044 × 222 × 195 mm, with a barrel length of 1500 mm and a weight of 105 kg. The GSh-30K is a modified version with 2400 mm long water-cooled barrels, a variable rate of fire, and dimensions of 2,944 × 222 × 195 mm. It is used on a fixed mounting on late model Mil Mi-24 helicopters, e.g. the Mi-24P.

== Variants ==
- GSh-30-2
- GSh-30-2K

== Specifications (GSh-30-2) ==
- Manufacturer: KBP Instrument Design Bureau
- Type: dual-barrel autocannon
- Caliber: 30×165mm, electrically primed
- Operation: recoil operation
- Length: 2,044 mm
- Barrel Length: 1,500 mm
- Weight (complete): 105 kg
- Rate of fire: 1,000–3,000 rpm
- Muzzle velocity: 870 m/s
- Projectile weight: 390 g
- Mounting platforms: Sukhoi Su-25 "Frogfoot"

== Specifications (GSh-30-2K) ==
- Manufacturer: KBP Instrument Design Bureau
- Type: dual-barrel autocannon
- Caliber: 30×165mm
- Operation: recoil operation
- Length: 2,944 mm
- Barrel Length: 2,400 mm
- Weight (complete): 126 kg
- Rate of fire: 300 rpm (low) – 2,000–2,600 rpm (high)
- Muzzle velocity: 940 m/s
- Projectile weight: 390 g
- Mounting platforms: Mil Mi-24P "Hind", Sukhoi Su-25 “Frogfoot”

== See also ==
- List of Russian weaponry
- List of multiple-barrel firearms

== Users ==
- Russian Federation
- Ukraine
- Pakistan
- China
- Bulgaria

=== Former user ===
- Soviet Union

== Sources ==
- Koll, Christian (2009). Soviet Cannon: A Comprehensive Study of Soviet Arms and Ammunition in Calibres 12.7mm to 57mm. Austria: Koll. p. 303. ISBN 978-3-200-01445-9.
- "KBP Instrument Design Bureau - Corporative Site". 17 July 2013. Archived from the original on 2013-07-17.
