= CIL =

CIL may refer to:

== Computers ==
- C Intermediate Language, a simplified subset of the C programming language
- Common Intermediate Language, a part of the Microsoft .NET runtime
- Computer and Information Literacy, a study of computer competence among students and teachers worldwide.

== Organisations ==
- Canadian Industries Limited, a chemical company best known for their explosives manufacturing and paints
- Centers for Independent Living, an American disabled persons' advocacy group
- Centre for International Law (CIL), part of the National University of Singapore
- Chicago, Indianapolis and Louisville Railway, a railway in Indiana, also known as the Monon Railroad
- Christadelphian Isolation League, a Christadelphian non-profit organisation
- Coal India Limited, an Indian state-owned coal company
- Commissioners of Irish Lights, the lighthouse authority for Ireland
- Crucible Industries LLC, the US steel producer of CPM steels
- COFCO International Limited, the overseas agribusiness platform for COFCO Group

== People ==
- Cil, an American singer-songwriter
- CIL Chen, a Chinese artist and writer

== Places ==
- Cil, Azerbaijan, a municipality in Lankaran Rayon
- Cil, a village in Almaș Commune, Arad County, Romania
- Cil, Armenia, a municipality in Armenia
- CIL (Casablanca), a quartier of Casablanca, Morocco
- Council Airport, airport code CIL
- Ciliwung LRT station, a light rail station in Jakarta, Indonesia

== Other ==
- Corpus Inscriptionum Latinarum, a collection of ancient Latin inscriptions
- Customary international law, those aspects of international law that derive from custom
- Community Infrastructure Levy, a type of planning gain
- Cash-in-lieu, a financial term used in the settlement of certain exchange traded options
