= Sile (disambiguation) =

Sile may refer to:

- Şile, a city and district of Istanbul Turkey
- Sille, an old former Greek village in Konya Province
- River Sile, a river in Italy
- Sile, an ancient Egyptian fortress
- Sile, a feminine name in Irish, usually anglicized as Sheila.
- Sile (typesetting system), a typesetting system loosely inspired on TeX
