= Roman Silin =

Russian politician (born 1973)

- Роман Силин

Member of the Legislative Assembly of the Republic of Karelia
- In office 22 December 2011 – 30 September 2016
- Constituency: Kukkovka

Personal details
- Born: 29 November 1973 (age 52) Petrozavodsk, Karelian ASSR, Russian SFSR, USSR
- Party: CPRF (since 2008)
- Education: Petrozavodsk State University
- Profession: Politician, engineer

Roman Anatolyevich Silin (Russian: Роман Анатольевич Силин; born 29 November 1973) is a Russian forest engineer and politician who served as a member of the Legislative Assembly of the Republic of Karelia from 2011 to 2016.
