= Speech interference level =

Acoustical parameter

Speech Interference Level (SIL) is an acoustical parameter calculated from sound pressure levels measured in octave bands. It is used to characterize a noise signal in the frequency range where the human ear has its highest sensitivity.

The Speech Interference Level is calculated as the arithmetic mean of unweighted sound pressure levels in three or four octave bands in the 500 Hz - 4 kHz frequency range.

Variants of Speech Interference Level
| PSIL | Arithmetic mean of 500 Hz, 1 kHz, and 2 kHz octave bands |
| SIL3 | Arithmetic mean of 1 kHz, 2 kHz, and 4 kHz octave bands |
| SIL4 | Arithmetic mean of 500 Hz, 1 kHz, 2 kHz, and 4 kHz octave bands |
