= Center for Informal Learning and Schools =

Center for Informal Learning and Schools (CILS) is an American-based National Science Foundation funded center to create a program of research, scholarship, and leadership in the arena of informal learning and the relationship of informal science institutions and schools. The center was founded in 2002.

== Functionality ==
Like all NSF-funded Centers for Learning and Teaching, CILS addresses "pressing problems confronting K-12 science education" by focusing on some key component of the national science education infrastructure.

In particular, CILS is concerned with making K-12 science education more compelling and accessible to a diverse student population, including students who come from families with little formal experience with K-12 schools and science learning. CILS does this through studying science learning in out-of-school settings, including informal science institutions, and building programmatic bridges between out-of-school and school science learning. In tandem with these studies, CILS seeks to build on and strengthen modes and methods of engagement and conceptual development commonly found in those settings.
