= Gryazev-Shipunov GSh-23 =

GSh-23
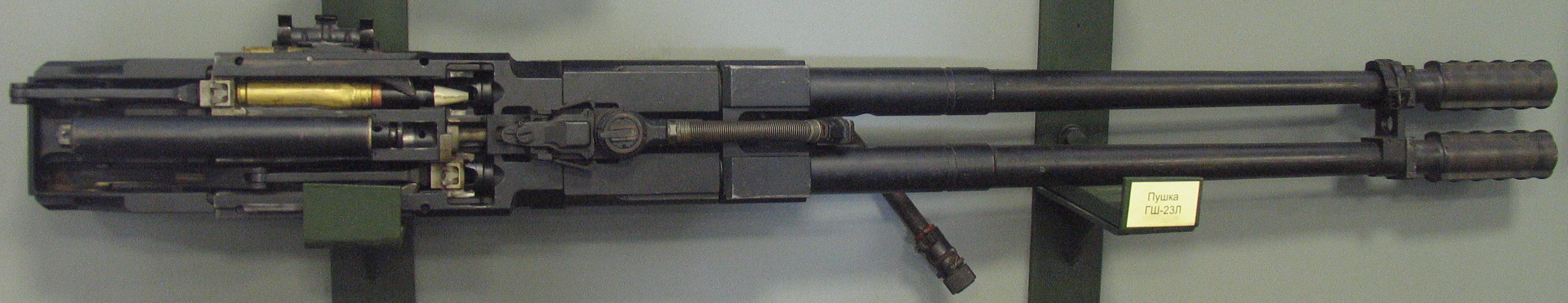
- GSh-23L
- Type: Autocannon
- Place of origin: Soviet Union

Service history
- In service: 1965–present
- Used by: See Users

Production history
- Designer: KBP Instrument Design Bureau
- Designed: Early 1960s
- Manufacturer: KBP Instrument Design Bureau
- Variants: GSh-23L

Specifications
- Mass: GSh-23: 49.2 kg (108 lb); GSh-23L: 50 kg (110 lb)
- Length: GSh-23: 1,387 mm (4 ft 7 in); GSh-23L: 1,537 mm (5 ft 1 in)
- Barrel length: 1,000 mm (3 ft 3 in)
- Cartridge: 23×115 mm
- Caliber: 23mm
- Barrels: 2
- Action: Gast principle
- Rate of fire: 3,400–3,600 rounds/min (alleged)
- Muzzle velocity: 715 m/s (2,350 ft/s)

The Gryazev-Shipunov GSh-23 (Russian: Грязев и Шипунов ГШ-23) is a twin-barreled 23 mm autocannon developed in the Soviet Union, primarily for military aircraft use. It entered service in 1965, replacing the earlier Nudelman-Rikhter NR-23 and Rikhter R-23.

The GSh-23 works on the Gast gun principle developed by German engineer Karl Gast of the Vorwerk company in 1916: it is a twin-barreled weapon in which the firing action of one barrel operates the mechanism of the other.

The Gast principle provides a much faster rate of fire for lower mechanical wear than a single-barrel weapon. It cannot match the sustained rate of fire of an electrically operated multi-barrel rotary cannon such as the M61 Vulcan, but does not require an external power source, being powered by the recoil of the floating barrels, somewhat like the action of the German MG-42. The Gast principle has been little used in the West, but was used on a variety of weapons in the Soviet Union.

The cannon comes in a basic GSh-23 variant, and the more popular GSh-23L (ГШ-23Л), differing mostly in adding a muzzle brake, lowering recoil force. This cannon was standard fit on late-model MiG-21 fighters (M, SM, MF, SMT, PFM, bis), all variants of the MiG-23, the SOKO J-22 Orao, the JF-17 Thunder, the HAL Tejas, the Aero L-39ZA Albatros and IAR 93, and the tail turrets of the Tupolev Tu-22M bomber and some late-model Tu-95MS and Tu-142M3. In the latter application, it had the unusual ability to fire infrared flares and chaff rounds, allowing it to function as both a weapon and a dispenser of anti-missile countermeasures. It is also mounted on late small series Mi-24VP helicopters (in the NPPU-23 movable mounting) and Polish W-3WA Sokół helicopter in fixed mounting. The cannon was also used on cargo aircraft; specifically, Russian/Soviet Ilyushin Il-76 aircraft were designed to accommodate twin GSh-23's in a tail turret. An Il-76M with this configuration was displayed at the 2002 Ivanovo airshow.

Some second-generation MiG-21 models could carry the GSh-23L in an under-fuselage gondola designated the GP-9, carrying the cannon and 200 rounds of ammunition; this was replaced by a more streamlined semi-conformal installation in later variants. There are also several gun pods available for mounting on external hardpoints: UPK-23 for air-to-air use, with one or two fixed GSh-23 guns and 200–400 rounds of ammunition, and SPPU-22 pods with barrels traversable from 0° to −30° for strafing, both carrying 280 rounds of ammunition; they were most often carried in pairs by the Su-17/-20/-22 and the Su-25/-39.

== Variants ==
- Gryazev-Shipunov GSh-23L, is a modernized air-cooled version with a muzzle brake added to reduce recoil. Used on NPPU-23 helicopter turret.
- Gryazev-Shipunov GSh-23V, is a water-cooled version of GSh-23L. Used on NPPU-23 helicopter turret.

== Users ==
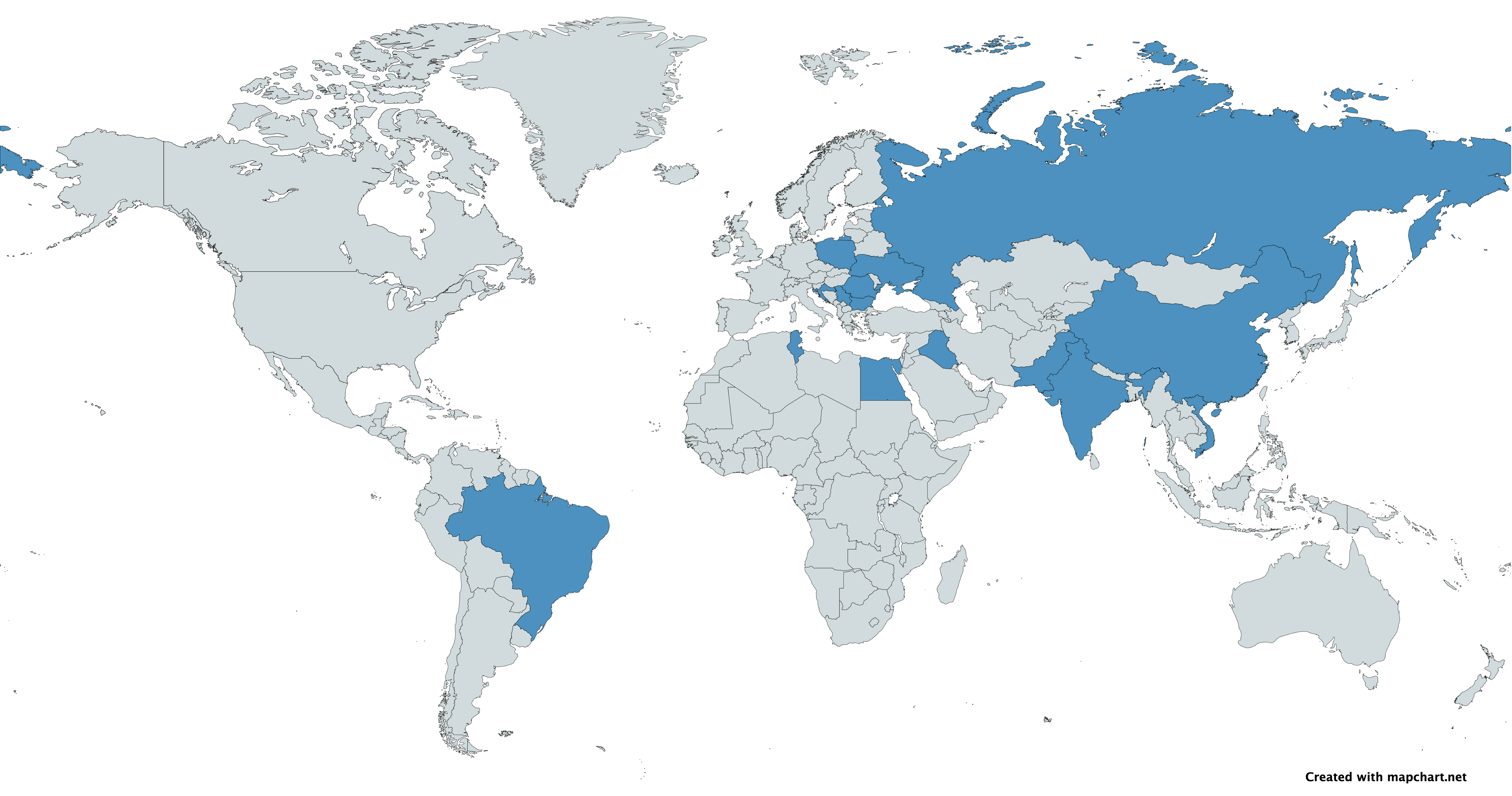
Map with Gryazev-Shipunov GSh-23 users in blue

- Brazil - Used on Mi-35M
- Bulgaria
- Czech Republic
- China
- Croatia
- Egypt – Used on L-59T Super-Albatross
- India Manufactured at Ordnance Factories Board
- Iraq used on Su-25
- Pakistan - JF-17 Thunder (all variants)
- Poland
- Romania – manufactured locally by SC Uzina Mecanică Cugir as GȘ-23.
- Russia
- Serbia
- Soviet Union
- Tunisia – Used on L-59T Super-Albatross
- Ukraine on SU-25M1
- Venezuela - Used on Mi-35M and Mi-17 gun pods
- Vietnam

== Gallery ==
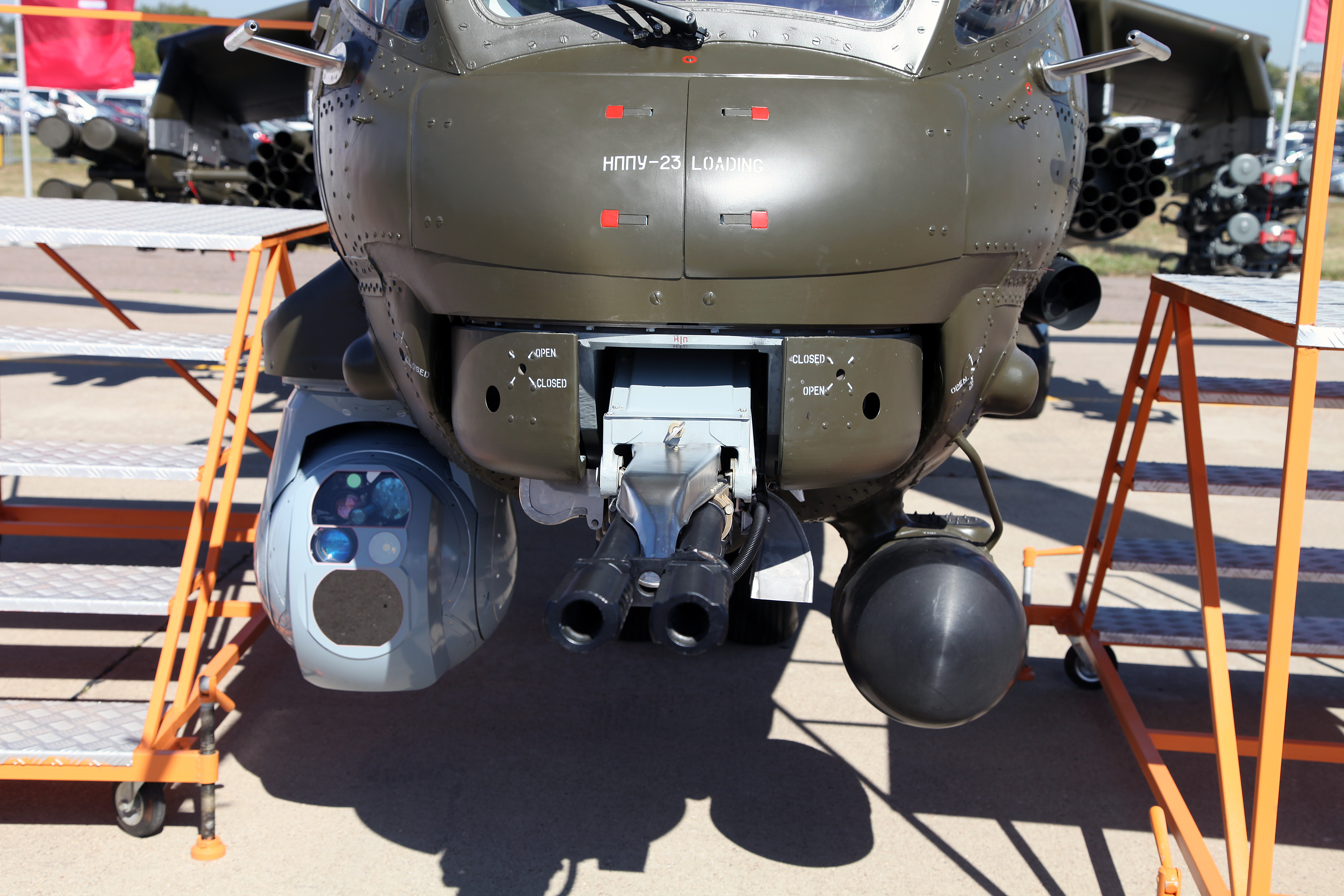
GSh-23 turret mounted on Mi-35.

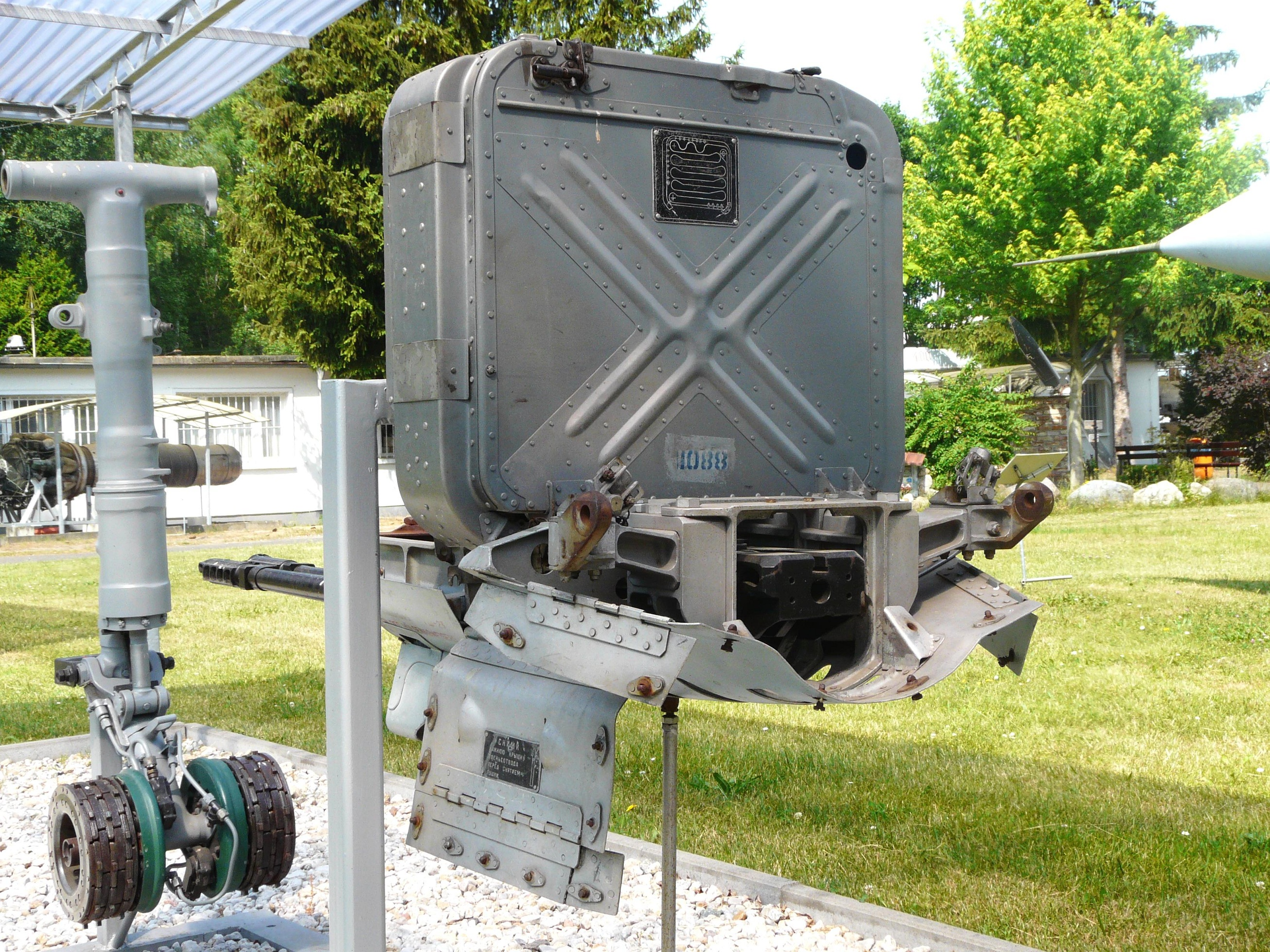
Gun system of a Mikoyan-Gurevich MiG-23 (machine gun GSh-23 with gun carriage and associated magazine).

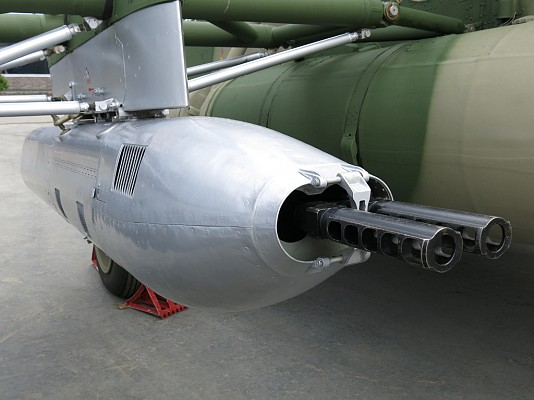
A UPK-23 gun pod on a Mil Mi-8.

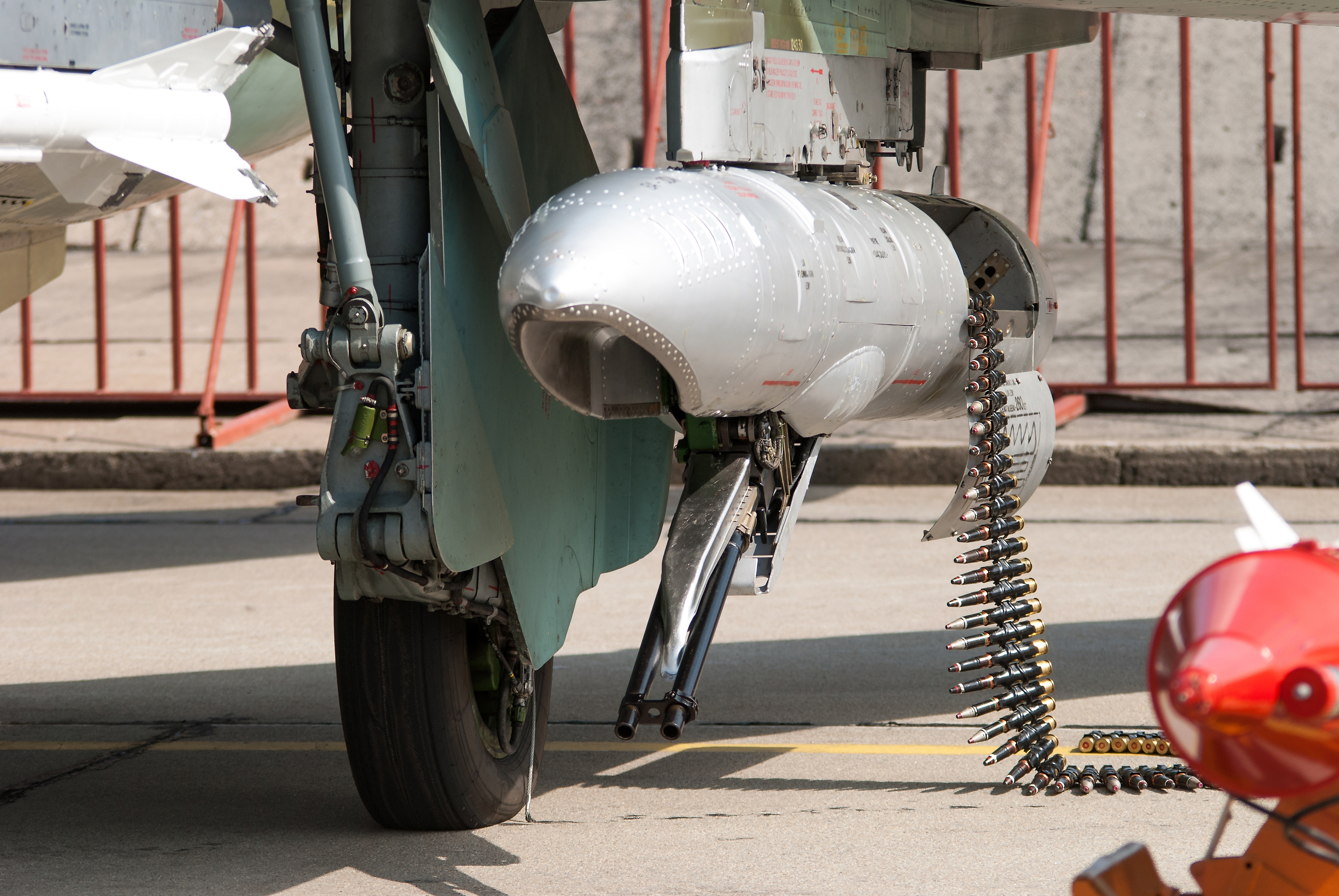
A SPPU-22-01 gun pod on a Sukhoi Su-17.

== See also ==
- Gryazev-Shipunov GSh-6-23
- Gryazev-Shipunov GSh-6-30
- KS-23
- List of modern Russian small arms and light weapons
- List of multiple-barrel firearms
- GAU-12 Equalizer
- Minigun
- Vyacheslav Ivanovich Silin
