= CIL Chen =

Chinese artist and writer (born 1963)

Donglan Chen also known as CIL Chen (Chinese: 曦儿, born 1963), is a Chinese former professor, artist, writer, and businesswoman who founded Shenzhen Duo Cai Fang Designing

== About CIL ==
In 1963, CIL was born in Huhhot of Inner Mongolia. In 1984, she graduated from Inner Mongolia University with a bachelor's degree in English Language and Literature and became a teaching assistant right after graduation. She moved to Shenzhen in 1989 and started a design company in 1996. She emigrated to the US in 2002. In 2008, she moved back to China and started her artistic and writing career. Her literature, painting, and sculpture firmly emphasized oriental culture, actively promoting humanism and focusing on self-cultivation and spiritual progress. Until 2007, CIL had published three full-length novels and two painting albums. Her literary works were printed in the Journal of Literature and Art, and the paintings were issued in Art Research, Gallery, etc. Her first solo exhibition was sponsored by the University Town Museum of Guangzhou Academy of Fine Arts, with Xiaoyan Yang as the curator, Johnson Chang as the academic chairman, and Zhengyao Zuo as the art director. The symposium participants included Shuangxi Yin, Hong Lu, Zhenhua Sun, Shaofeng Ji, Yuan Feng, and Bin Hu. Websites like artron.net, gd.qq.com, Sina News, toutiao.com published articles about this exhibition.

== Artistic activities ==
From 2017 to 2018, CIL's art pieces were selected to be part of Return to Ontology Art Exhibitions: Tracing the Source of Abstract Art in the New period of Guangdong, which is a cross cities and years group exhibition organized by the Lingnan Painting Academy, curated by Xiaoyan Yang and Bin Hu, and sponsored by the Lingnan Art Museum, Guanshanyue Art Museum and Art Museum of GAFA.

In July 2016, The Way of Nature: CIL Painting Exhibition was sponsored by the University Town Museum of Guangzhou Academy of Fine Arts with Zhengyao Zuo as the art director, Xiaoyan Yang as the Curator, and Johnson Chang as the academic chair. Scholars and guests like Shuangxi Yin, Shaofeng Ji, Hong Lu, Zhenhua Sun, Yuan Feng, Bin Hu, Ziyu Zheng, and Weiping He attended the opening ceremony and symposium.

In August 2015, Dimension 22VR art show was held at the South China Book Festival with the Lingnan Fine Arts Publishing House.

In March 2013, the performance art Incubation of Confucian businessmen was showcased in Guangzhou, China. The video got published on gd.qq.com.

In July 2016, Guangzhou Daily, artron.net, gd.qq.com, Sina News, toutiao.com, 3 g.21cn.com, etc., published relevant reports and videos of the opening ceremony and interviews of "The Way of Nature: CIL Painting Exhibition".

== Published books ==
- In 2017, The Art of CIL, an art album, was published by the Lingnan Fine Arts Publishing House with Xiaoyan Yang as the Chief Editor.
- In 2016, Dimension 22, a full-length illustrated magic realist novel, was published by the Lingnan Fine Arts Publishing House.
- In 2013, Growing with China (Shang Hen), a full-length romantic realist novel, and CIL Oil Paintings & Notes were published by the Lingnan Fine Arts Publishing House.
- In 2010, Message from the Orient, a full-length financial novel, was published by the Guangzhou Publishing House.

== Other publications ==
- CIL's World by Zhenhua Sun, Issue 1, 2017, Art Research
- The Dimension of Spirit: On CIL's Art by Shuangxi Yin, Issue 10, 2016, Art China
- The Way of Nature: On CIL and Her Painting by Xiaoyan Yang, Issue 11, 2016, Art Monthly
- On CIL and Her Painting by Xiaoyan Yang, Art Overview, Boya Collection, July 3, 2016, Guangzhou Daily
- Q & A about CIL's "Jianyi Art", Issue 6 (two editions), 2014, Gallery
- Noted Artist CIL A15, Issue March 6, 2013, Yangcheng Evening News
- Son and Gold (Fable novella), Page 1, Novel section, Issue March 8, 2010, Journal of Literature and Art

== Milestones ==
| Year | Study |
|---|---|
| 2014 | Finished studies from the seminar of "Methodology and Writing of Art Criticism" launched by Central Academy of Fine Arts |
| 2013 | Finished studies from the Contemporary Art Creation Program supervised by Chinese painting masters at the Academy of Art & Design, Tsinghua University |
| 2011 | Attended a non-degree program in the Lu Xun Literature Institute and learnt a lot from Mo Yan's teaching |
| 2010 | Won the title of "Distinguished Alumni" of the University of Minnesota |
| 2006 | Worked as a consultant to Perot's Hillwood Properties |
| 2003 | Worked as a Director and Executive Deputy General Manager of Hong Kong Haibeike Company (a joint venture of Himalaya Investments in U.S. and Fenghua Gaoke listed in Shanghai Stock Exchange) |
| 1996 | Worked as a Founder and General Manager of Shenzhen Duo Cai Fang Designing Ltd. |
| 1984 | Obtained a B.A. Degree in English Language and Literature at Inner Mongolia University (IMU) |
