= Lake Sils (Catalonia) =

Sils Lake
- Estany de Sils (Catalan)
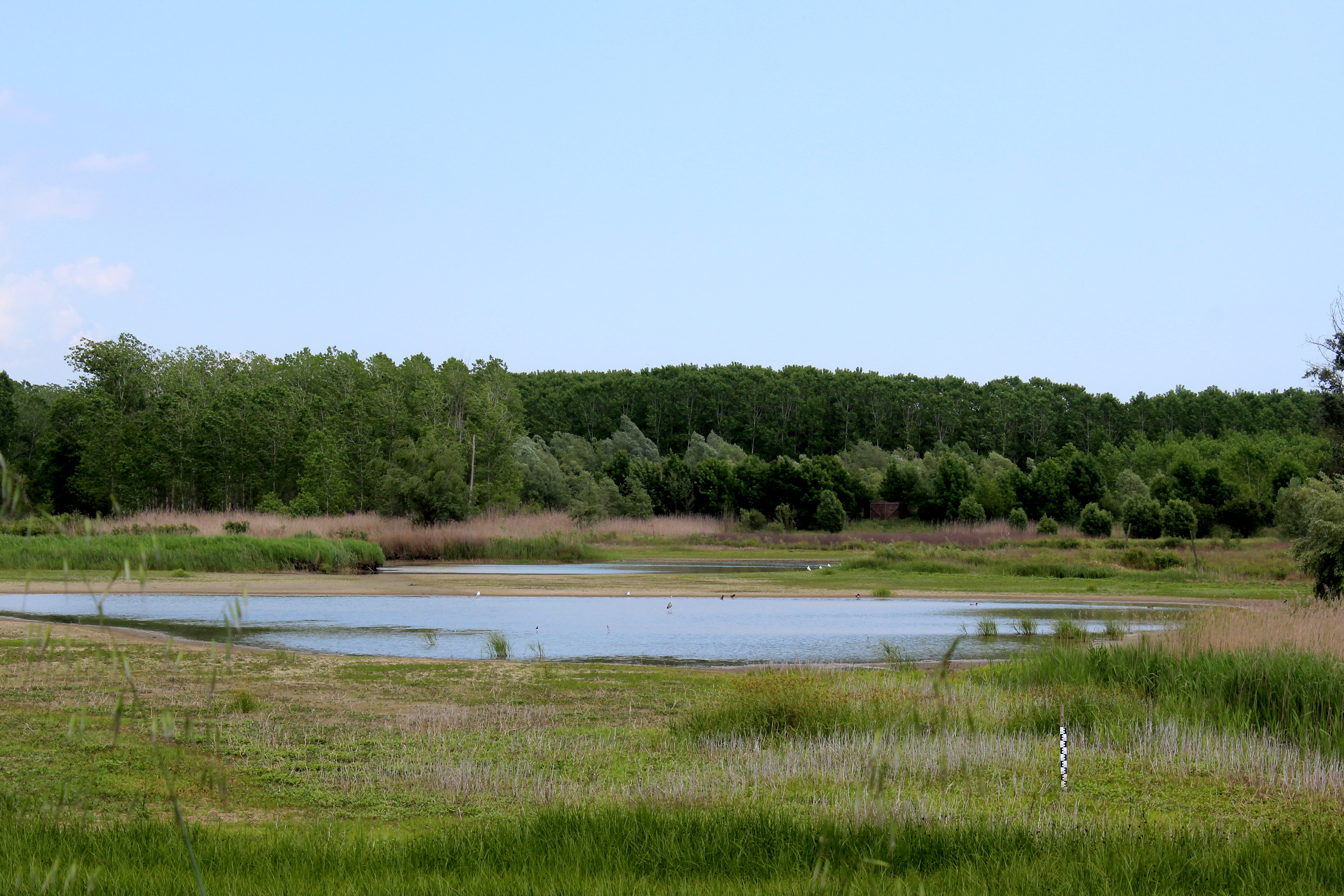
- View of one of the residual seasonal wetlands of the former Lake Sils

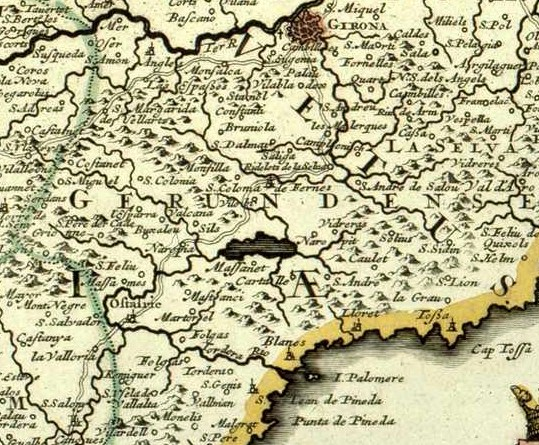
- Sils Lake as it appears in 17th century Principatus Cataloniae Map published in Amsterdam by Cornelis Danckerts

- Location within Catalonia Location within Spain
- Location: Caldes de Malavella, Maçanet de la Selva and Sils; La Selva
- Coordinates: 41°48′25″N 2°44′45″E
- Type: Dry lake
- Primary inflows: Riera de Vallcanera; Riera de Santa Maria; Rec Sorrer; El Reclar; Riera de Pins; La Torderola
- Basin countries: Catalonia, Spain
- Max. length: dry bed 5 km (3.1 mi)
- Surface area: dry bed 7 km^{2} (2.7 sq mi)
- Average depth: dry
- Surface elevation: 69 m (226 ft)

Lake Sils, Catalan Estany de Sils or Llac de Sils, is a freshwater dry lake with residual wetlands and marshes located in Caldes de Malavella, Maçanet de la Selva and Sils municipal terms, in the comarca of Selva, Catalonia, Spain. Located in a tectonic basin, this lake was the largest natural lake in Catalonia before being drained in the nineteenth century.

== History ==
The original surface of the ancient lake was around 7 km^{2}, therefore it appears larger than Lake Banyoles in the ancient cartography of Catalonia.

The lake was located in a tectonic depression without natural drainage. The highly seasonal rivers of Riera de Vallcanera, Riera de Santa Maria, Rec Sorrer, El Reclar, Riera de Pins and la Torderola contributed with their waters to fill Lake Sils basin. The surface of the lake was most likely subject to periodical variations, reaching its lowest level at the height of the summer in periods of drought when inflow reached a minimum and evaporation was high.

As in most wetlands in Europe in the past, the Sils Lake was seen as an unhealthy area, a focus of maladies. There were several attempts to drain the lake in the past centuries, but these were not successful. Finally in 1851, as part of a campaign against malaria and to promote agricultural development, a long canal was built leading to the Riera de Santa Coloma —a tributary of the Tordera River— and the waters of the lake ebbed away. The lands that were obtained through the desiccation of the lake area were distributed among the people who had built the drainage canal.

As time went by the lake basin filled mainly with hay fields that were cut in order to store hay for the local cattle in the winter. Towards the last quarter of the 20th century, when cattle-rearing was on the wane in the region, the hayfields gave way to poplar and London plane plantations for commercial use.

=== Maps ===
Sils Lake is represented clearly in the following ancient maps, among others:

- "Cataloniae principatus descriptio nova" by Gerard Mercator, 1619
- "Catalonia de Guiljelmus Blaeu excud.", Amsterdam, 1632
- "Cataloniae principatus et Ruscinonis ac Cerretaniae comitatuum exactissima dilineatio, cura et studio de Matthäus Seutter", 1740
- "Cataloniae principatus, nec non Ruscinonensis et Cerretaniae Comitatus in eorum vicariatus peraccurae distincti de Nicolaum Visser"
- "Cataloniae Principatus novissima et accurata descriptio" by J.B. Vrients, 1608

== Ecology ==
Nowadays there are a few vestiges of the former lake as marshes and seasonal ponds in the area formerly occupied by Lake Sils. These are partly a fruit of the effort of a 1998 project called "Life" under which some of the former hayfields are being restored by buying private land. The final and most ambitious part of the project is to reestablish a permanent lake and recreate some of the local forest that had formerly grown at the edges of the ancient lake. This project is under the 'Natural Interest Areas Plan', Pla d'Espais d'Interès Natural (PEIN) of the Generalitat, and is part of the Natura 2000 ecological network of protected areas in the territory of the European Union.

=== Species ===
There are many different species of birds in the few marshes remaining in the area. These were probably part of the original fauna of the lake that disappeared. Among the herpetological fauna, the Mediterranean Painted Frog, the Palmate Newt, the European pond terrapin and the small snake Natrix maura deserve mention.

It is difficult to know which fishes inhabited the waters of the ancient lake. The incertitude is largely based on the introduction of exotic species, such as common carp, crucian carp and Gambusia rather than to the probable extinction of some original local species. Besides the exotic species, nowadays the European chub and European eel are common in the present remaining wetlands and rivulets. The population of three-spined stickleback in the remaining water bodies of the ancient lake is the only presence of this species in the area of the Tordera basin.

== Lake basin ==
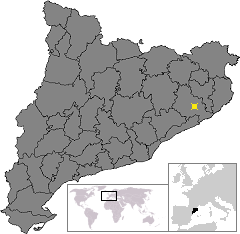
Lake Sils basin location

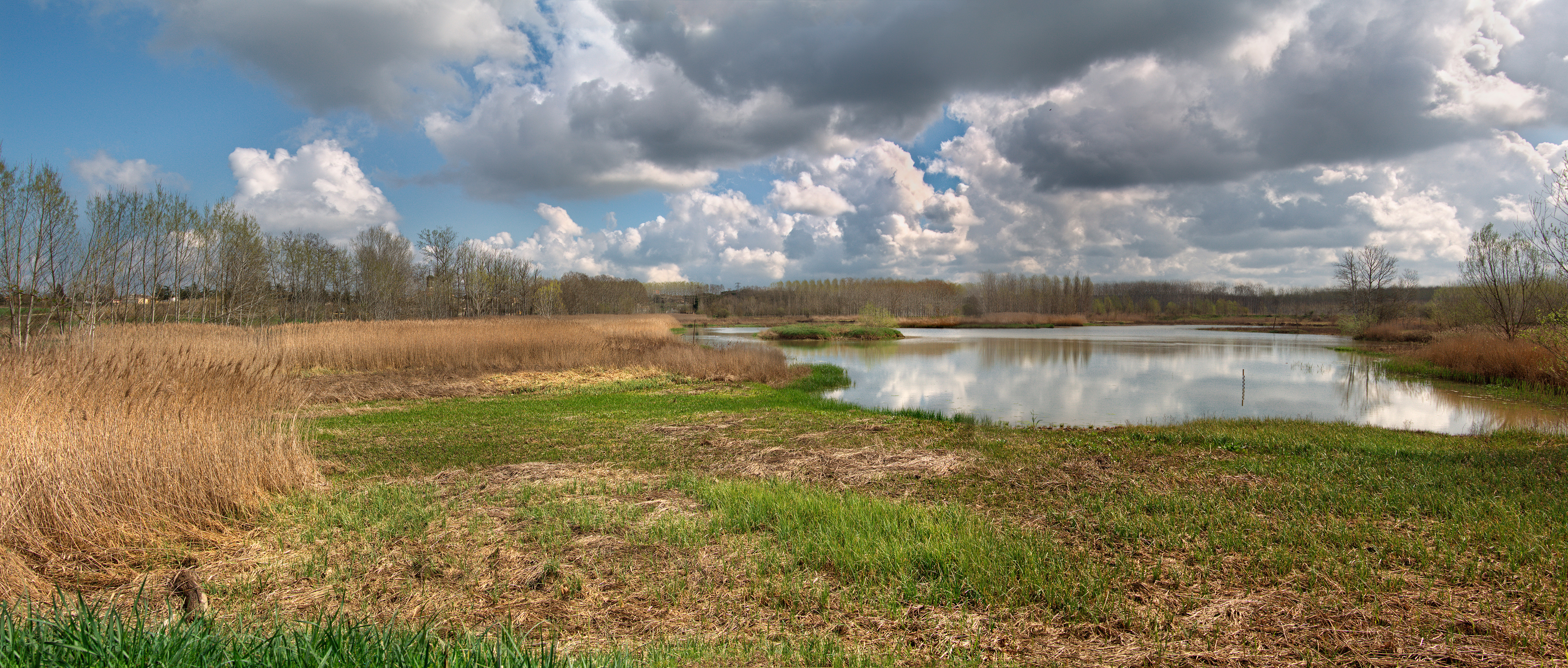
A seasonal pond, one of the remaining vestiges of ancient Lake Sils.

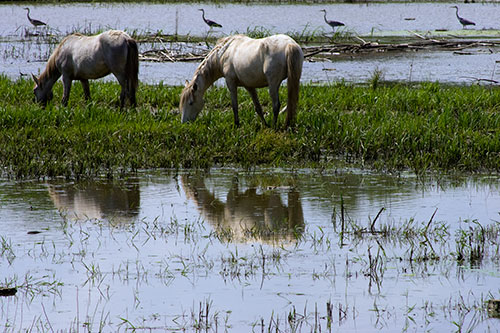
Image of a marsh in the former lake basin. Summer 2008.
