= Sils, Spain =

Sils
- Municipality
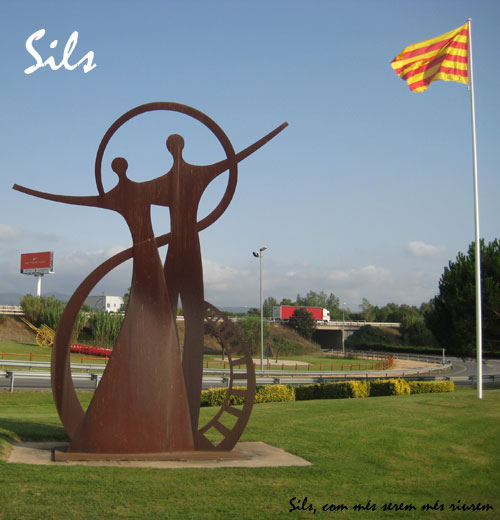
- Monument at entrance to Sils

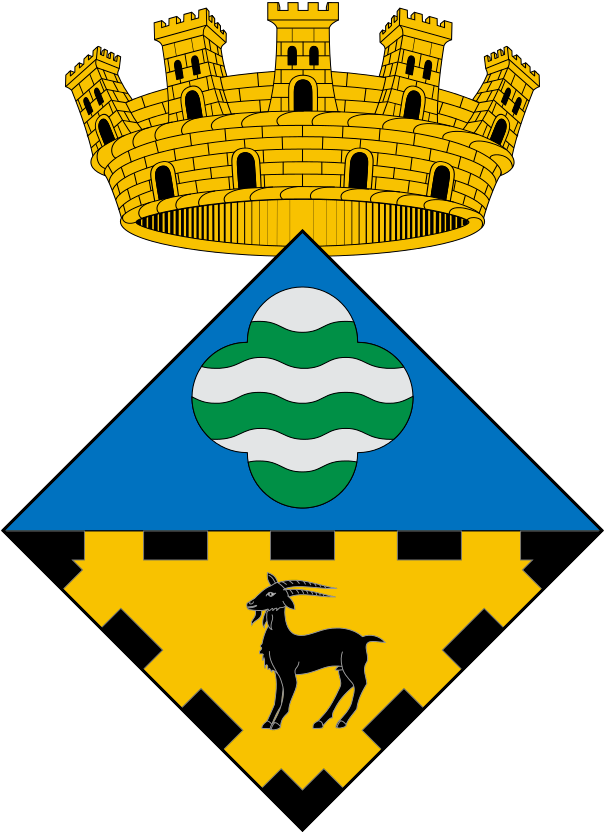
- Flag Coat of arms

- Location in Catalonia Sils (Spain)
- Coordinates: 41°48′N 2°45′E
- Country: Spain
- Community: Catalonia
- Province: Girona
- Comarca: Selva

Government
  - Mayor: Eduard Colomé Ribas (2019)

Area
  - Total: 29.9 km^{2} (11.5 sq mi)
- Elevation: 76 m (249 ft)

Population (2025-01-01)
  - Total: 6,920
  - Density: 231/km^{2} (599/sq mi)
- Demonym(s): Silenc, silenca
- Website: www.sils.cat

Sils (Catalan pronunciation: [ˈsils]) is a municipality in the comarca of Selva, in Catalonia, Spain. It is situated next to a former lake, which was drained in the nineteenth century. Autopista AP-7 and road N-II run through the municipality, and there is a Renfe railway station on the line between Barcelona and Girona.

== Demography ==
1900	1930	1950	1970	1986	2007
1221	1362	1586	1923	2058	4347

== Lake Sils ==
Formerly a 7 km^{2} lake, known as Llac de Sils or Estany de Sils existed close to this town, but it was desiccated in the 19th century and only a few residual wetlands remain. Presently some efforts are under way to try to reestablish a pond restoring a sample of the original vegetation.

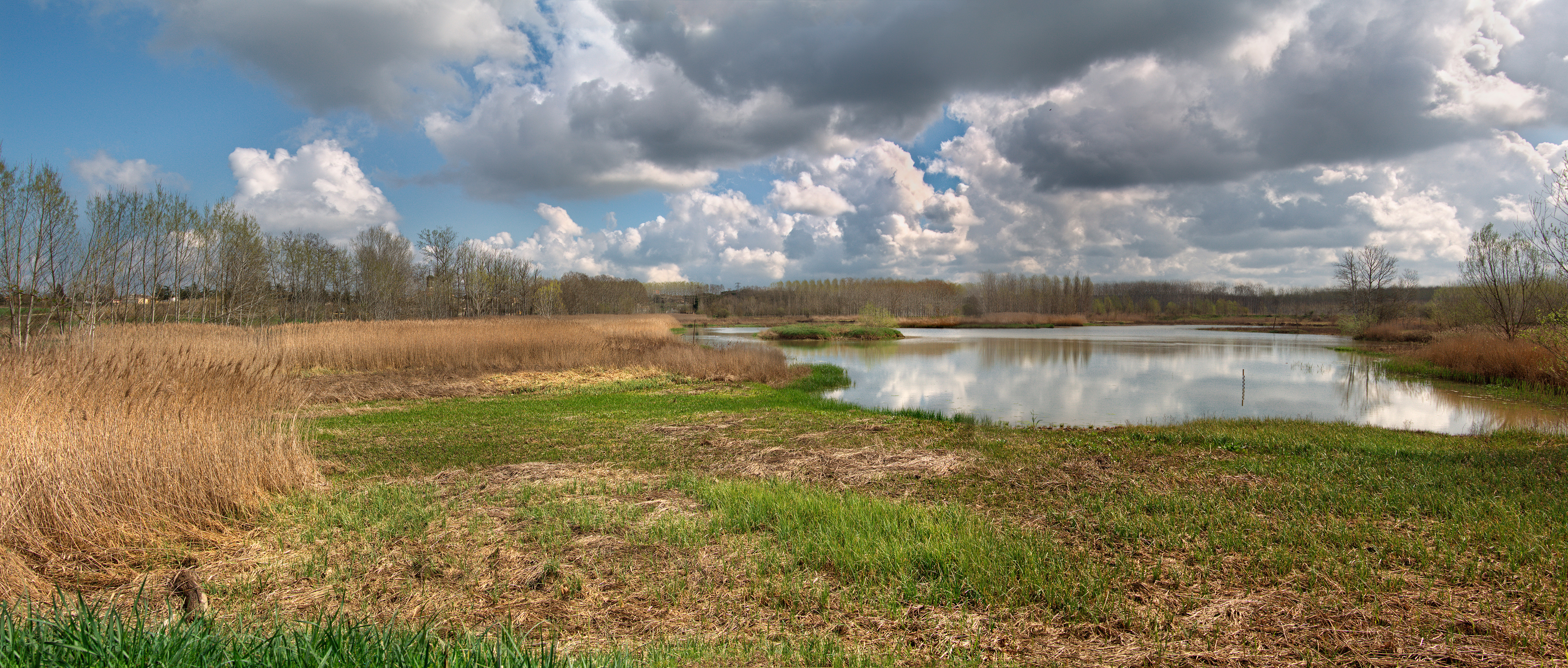
A seasonal pond, one of the remaining vestiges of ancient Lake Sils.

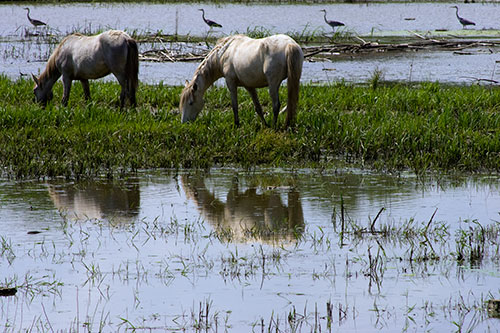
Image of a marsh in the former lake basin. Summer 2008.
