= Vyacheslav Silin =

Soviet weapons engineer

- Born: Vyacheslav Ivanovich Silin; February 22, 1907; Tula, Russian Empire
- Died: November 20, 1975 (aged 68)
- Occupation: Firearms designer

Vyacheslav Ivanovich Silin (Russian: Вячеслав Иванович Силин; 22 February 1907 – 20 November 1975) was a leading Soviet weapons engineer.

== Biography ==
Silin was born in Tula. In 1919, he began working at the Tula Arms Plant. His work was halted while he served in the Red Army from 1931-1932, but throughout the rest of his life, he was a leading figure in the engineering and construction of military technology for the Soviet Union. He died on November 20, 1975.

== Technology produced ==
Silin produced several important weapons for the USSR, both through his own engineering work and under his direction. Most notably, whilst working at the Central Bureau for the Construction and Research of Recreational and Hunting Weapons during the 1960s, he was directly involved in the creation of the main armament for the BMP-1 and BMD-1 infantry fighting vehicles - the 73mm 2A28 Grom.

In 1935, his involvement with a project to develop a new machine-gun for the Soviet Air Forces led to the development of the 7.62mm Sibemas aircraft machine gun (VI Silin, M. E. Berezin, P. Morozenko) with a rate of fire of 6,000 rounds/min. Work on the design of such weapons was halted in the late 1940s, due to shortcomings in the design.

In 1939 Silin participated in a competition to create a 7.62mm machine gun. He developed the TCB-67 machine gun, which successfully passed field testing. Silin participated in the design of the VYa-23 and B-20 aircraft automatic cannons. In the late 1940s and early 1950s, Silin developed the TKB-440 and TKB-458M 7.62mm machine-guns, as well as the 23mm TKB-505 and 30mm TKB-515 revolving automatic cannons.

As chief designer at the Central Bureau in Tula from 1960 until his death, Silin spearheaded the development of anti-tank grenade launchers. From 1960 to 1963, he worked with AT Alekseev to develop the SPG-9 73mm Smoothbore Recoilless Gun, which was significantly lighter and more effective than other foreign Recoilless weapons of the period. In 1961-1966, Silin, together with VI Zaitsev, NS Pasenko, and VI Volkov, developed the smoothbore 73mm semi-automatic 2A28 Grom, which was used as the primary armament for the BMP-1 and BMD-1 Infantry Fighting Vehicles.

== Awards and honors ==
- Order of Lenin (1939)
- Lenin Prize (1967)
- Two Orders of the Red Banner of Labour
- Order of the Patriotic War, 2nd class
