= List of long-distance footpaths =

This is a list of some long-distance footpaths used for walking and hiking.

== Africa ==
=== Lesotho ===
- 3 Ranges Trail: 288.3 km (179.1 mi) a hiking trail that passes three mountain ranges, namely Thaba Putsoa Range, Central Range and ends at Drakensburg Range. It starts at Lesotho lowest point, at the confluence of Makhaleng and Senqu and ends at the country's highest point, Thabana Ntlenyane (3482m).

=== Namibia ===
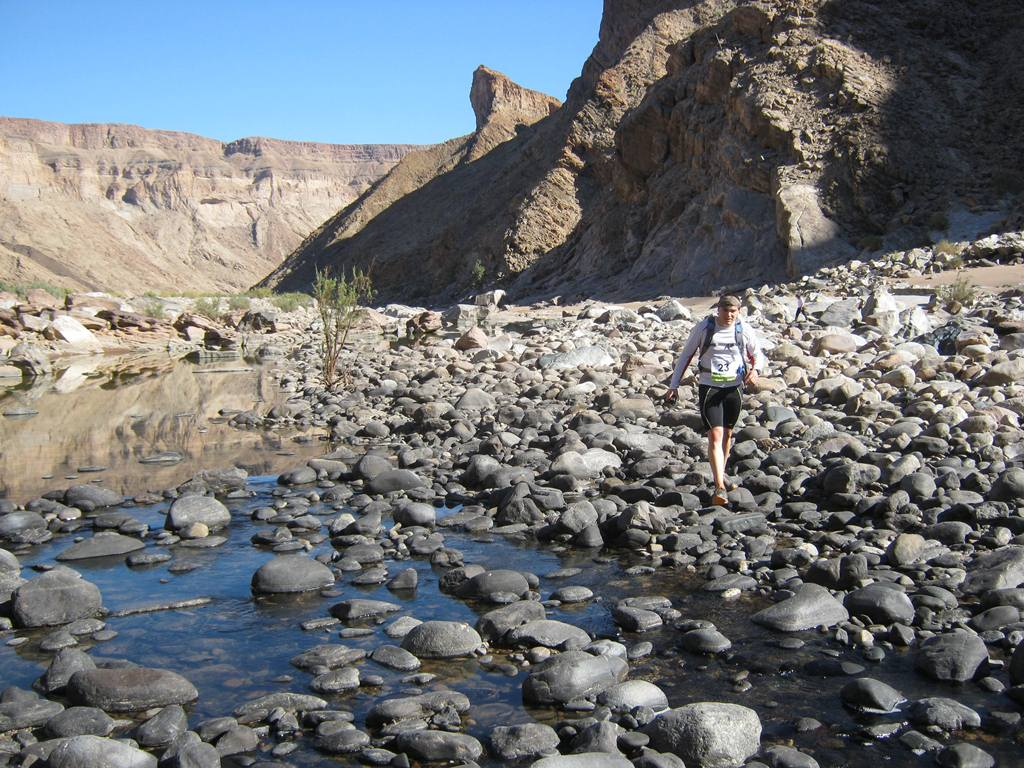
Trail running in the Fish River Canyon

- Fish River Canyon: 90 km (56 mi) route in the ǀAi-ǀAis/Richtersveld Transfrontier Park

=== South Africa ===
- Otter Trail: 44 km (27 mi) section of the Garden Route along the Cape coast
- Drakensberg Grand Traverse: rugged 205 km (127 mi) trek in KwaZulu-Natal

=== Egypt ===
- Sinai Trail: 250 km (160 mi) thru-hike from Nuweiba to Mount Catherine

=== Uganda ===
- Sir Samuel and Lady Florence Baker Trail: 575 km (357 mi) trek through northern Uganda

== Asia ==
=== Bangladesh ===
- Jhiri Path: ascent of Keokradong, one of the highest mountains in Bangladesh.

=== Bhutan ===
- Snowman Trek: 328 km (204 mi) trek through high passes near the border with Tibet

=== Hong Kong ===
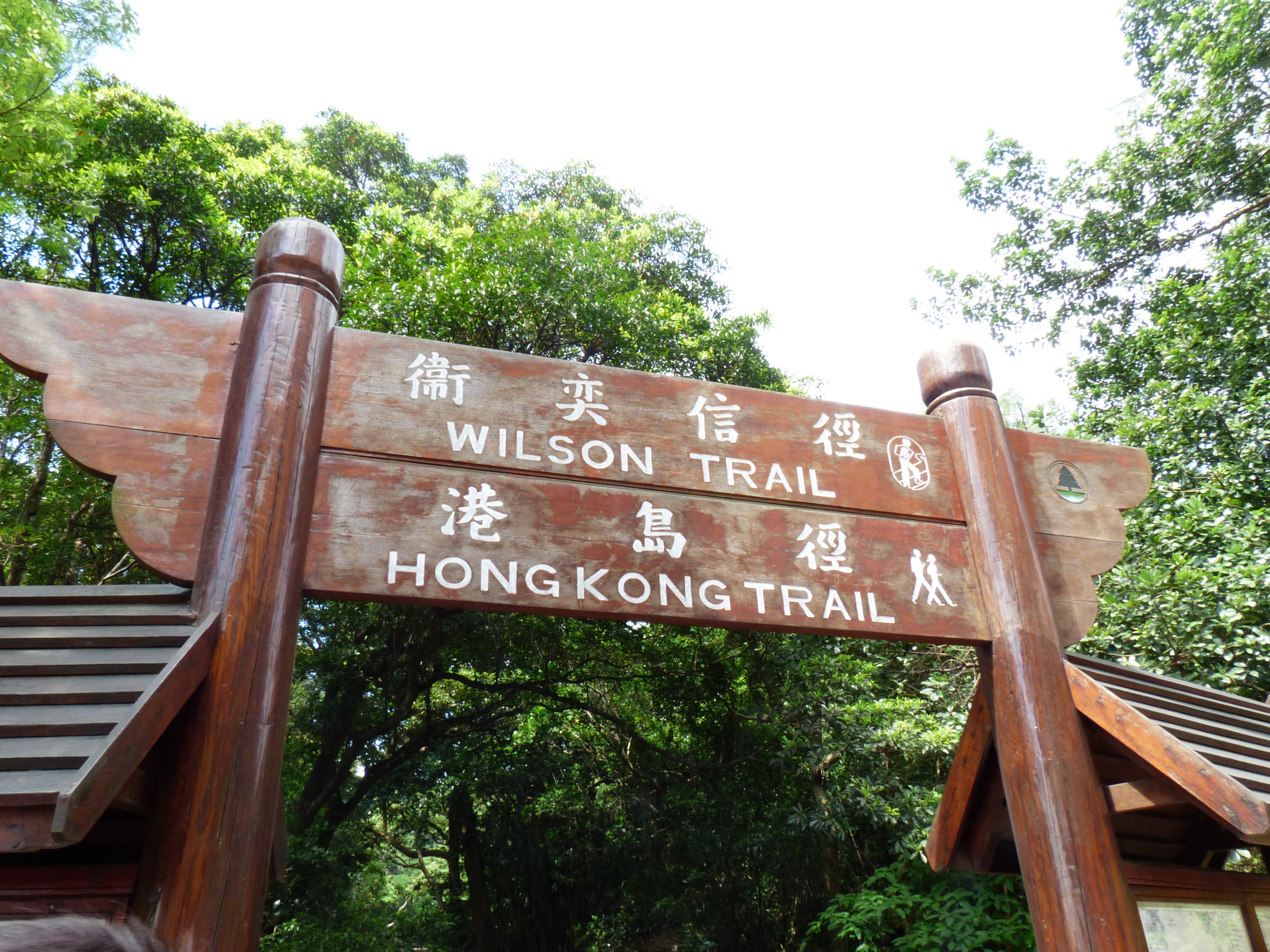
Wilson Trail and Hong Kong Trail meets at Hong Kong Parkview

- Hong Kong Trail: 50 km (31 mi) across Hong Kong Island
- Lantau Trail: 70 km (43 mi) on Lantau Island
- Wilson Trail: 78 km (48 mi) from Stanley, Hong Kong Island to Nam Chung, New Territories

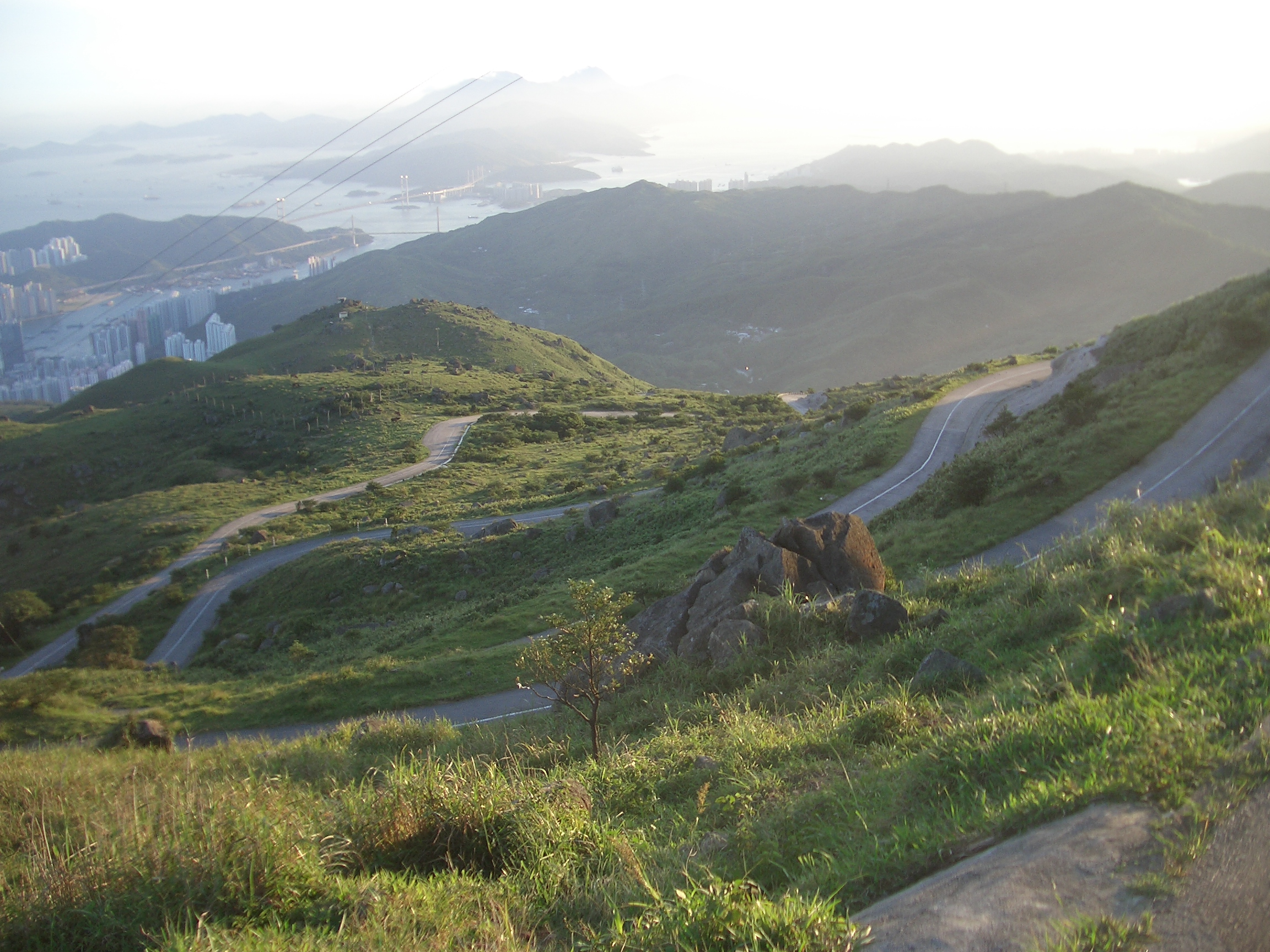
Road to Tai Mo Shan summit in the New Territories, Hong Kong

- MacLehose Trail: 100 km (62 mi) from Sai Kung to Tuen Mun

=== Georgia ===
- Transcaucasian Trail: 300 km (190 mi) of trail over Georgia and Armenia

=== India ===
- Great Lakes Trek: 90 km (56 mi), Himalayan trek, from Sonamarg to Naranag.
- The Dang: 90 km (56 mi), The route follows the path of the King of the Dangs, from his residence to the Mount Mary Steps via his favourite den at the foot of his Sea Breeze residence.

=== Israel ===
- Israel National Trail: 1,000 km (620 mi) from Dan to Eilat, covering many historic and scenic points
- Jerusalem Trail: 40 km (25 mi) trail, connecting the Israel National Trail with Jerusalem
- Jesus Trail: 65 km (40 mi) in the Galilee region, connecting important sites from the life of Jesus. The trail begins in Nazareth and passes through Sepphoris, Cana, the horns of Hattin, Arbel Cliffs, Capernaum, Tabgha, the Mount of Beatitudes, the Jordan River, and Mount Tabor.
- Golan Trail: 130 km (81 mi) from Mt. Hermon to the Sea of Galilee
- Sea to sea trail: 70 km (43 mi) from the sea of Galilee to the Mediterranean Sea
- Valley of the springs Trail (Emek HaMaayanot): 140 km (87 mi) around the Valley of springs near the Sea of Galilee
- Haifa Wadis Trail: 50 km (31 mi) trail connecting the Israel National Trail with Haifa and its surroundings

=== Japan ===
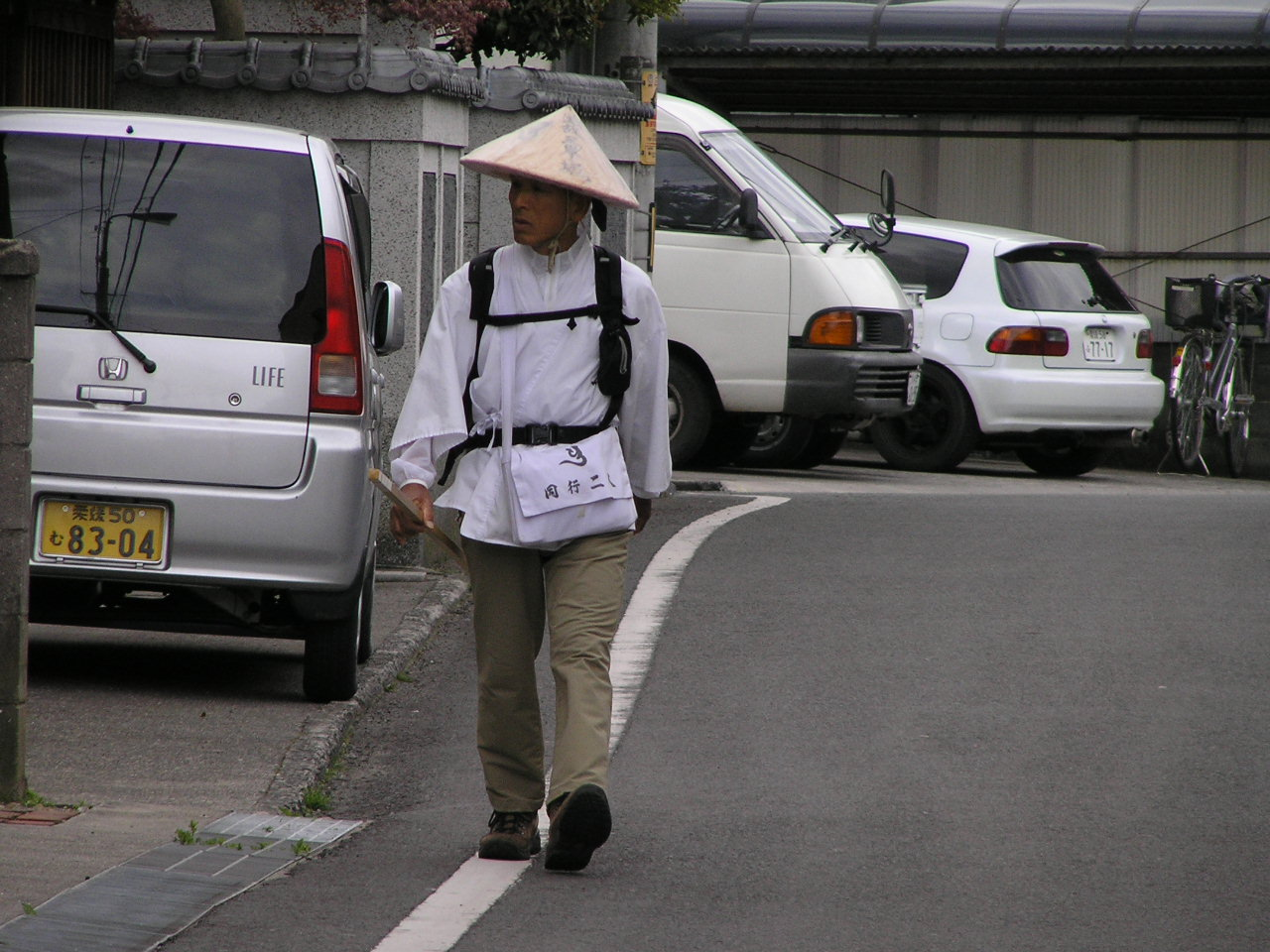
An aruki-henro or walking pilgrim, marked out by his distinctive sedge hat, white shirt, and kongō-zue

- Hokkaidō Nature Trail: 4,585 km (2,849 mi) all over the island of Hokkaidō (in planning)
- Tōhoku Nature Trail: 4,374 km (2,718 mi) within Aomori, Iwate, Miyagi, Akita, Yamagata and Fukushima prefectures
- Chubu Hokuriku Nature Trail: 4,029 km (2,504 mi) within Gunma, Niigata, Toyama, Ishikawa, Fukui, Nagano, Gifu and Shiga prefectures
- Kantō Fureai Trail: 1,665 km (1,035 mi) within Ibaraki, Tochigi, Gunma, Saitama, Chiba, Tōkyō and Kanagawa prefectures. Also known as the Capital Region Nature Trail.
- Tōkaidō Nature Trail: 1,697 km (1,054 mi) from Tokyo to Osaka via Kanagawa, Yamanashi, Shizuoka, Aichi, Shiga, Gifu, Mie, Kyōto and Nara prefectures
- Kinki Nature Trail: 3,291 km (2,045 mi) within Fukui, Mie, Shiga, Kyōto, Osaka, Hyōgo, Nara, Wakayama and Tottori prefectures
- Chugoku Nature Trail: 2,211 km (1,374 mi) within Tottori, Shimane, Okayama, Hiroshima and Yamaguchi prefectures
- Shikoku Nature Trail: 1,637 km (1,017 mi) within Ehime, Tokushima, Kagawa and Kōchi prefectures
- Kyushu Nature Trail: 2,587 km (1,607 mi) within Fukuoka, Saga, Nagasaki, Kumamoto, Oita, Miyazaki and Kagoshima prefectures
- Michinoku Coastal Trail: 1,025 km (637 mi) within Aomori, Iwate, Miyagi and Fukushima prefectures

Japan is also home to several lengthy pilgrimage routes, such as the 1,200 km (750 mi) Shikoku Pilgrimage that visits 88 temples and Mount Kōya. Today these temples and shrines are easily accessible by car and mass transit, but many visitors choose to walk the traditional routes.

=== Jordan ===
- Jordan Trail: 600 km (370 mi) north-south, cross country from Um Qais to Aqaba

=== Kyrgyzstan ===
- Snow Leopard Track: An in-development international trail spanning approximately 9,400km. Currently it has sections in Nepal, India, Pakistan, Afghanistan, Tajikistan, Kyrgyzstan, and Kazakhstan, but will theoretically connect all 12 countries with active wild snow leopard populations.

=== Lebanon ===
- Lebanon Mountain Trail, a 26-day 440 km (270 mi) trail through Mount Lebanon

=== Myanmar ===
- Hkakabo Razi Trail, climbing the highest peak in Myanmar, in Khakaborazi National Park, and various footpaths in Putao

=== Nepal ===
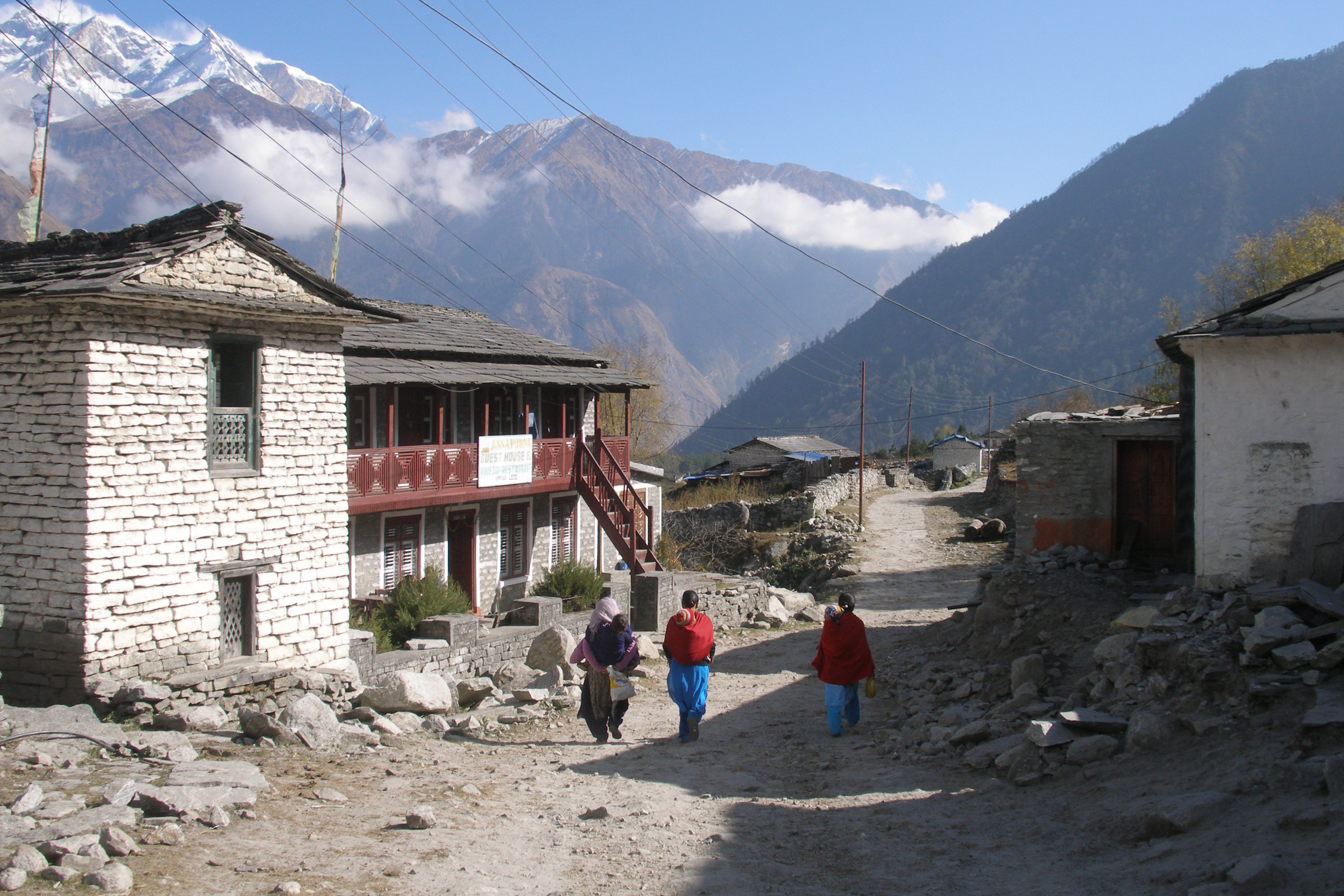
Path through Lete on the Annapurna Circuit

- Trek to Everest Base Camp, an 18-day trail to the base camp of Mt. Everest
- 230 km (140 mi) Annapurna Circuit, a 3-week loop trek through the Annapurna range
- 277 km (172 mi) Manaslu Circuit Trek, a 3-week loop trek through the adjacent range to the Annapurna region—the Manaslu region. (see Manaslu Circuit at WikiVoyage)

The Great Himalaya Trail is a proposed 4,500 km (2,800 mi) trail from Namche Barwa, Tibet to Nanga Parbat, Pakistan, with sections in Bhutan, China, and India. It uses existing trails, many of which are trekking, trade, or pilgrimage routes, but no new trails have been built. Starting near Kanchenjunga in the east and ending in Humla in the west, the Nepal section has been walked and documented and is about 1,600 km (990 mi).

=== Russia ===
- Great Baikal Trail
- Frolikha Adventure Coastline Track F.A.C.T.: 100 km (62 mi) trail at the northern tip of Lake Baikal
- Doroga v Lavru: 120 km from Moscow to Sergiev Posad.

=== Sri Lanka ===
- The Pekoe Trail: 300 km, a 22-stage hike through Sri Lanka's tea plantations.

=== South Korea ===
- Korea Dulle Trail: 4,500 km (2,800 mi) trail around the country mainland
- Seoul Trail: 156.5 km (97.2 mi) trail around Seoul
- Jeju Olle Trail: 437 km (272 mi) trail around Jeju Island
- Baekdudaegan Trail: 750 km (470 mi) along the ridge of the Baekdudaegan range

=== Taiwan ===
- Taipei Grand Trail

=== Tajikistan ===
- Pamir Trail – 1297 km (806 mi) trail from Shring to Vrang

=== Türkiye ===
- Sufi Trail – 801 km (498 mi) trail from Istanbul to Konya, following the Ottoman Sultans Hajj route
- Lycian Way – 540 km (340 mi) trail around the south coast of Turkey
- Saint Paul Trail – 500 km (310 mi) trail following St Paul's 1st journey
- Sultans Trail runs 2,200 km (1,400 mi) from Vienna through the Balkans, terminating in Istanbul
- Kaçkar Trails – 8 multi-day trails in Northeast Turkey
- Evliya Çelebi Way – the first part of Evliya's route to Mecca in the 17th century
- Phrygian Way – three separate trekking and cycling trails of total 506 km (314 mi) in the Phrygian Valleys, western Turkey,
- Carian Trail – 800 km (500 mi) hugging the south-west coast of Turkey

== Europe ==
Some of the best known footpaths in Europe are joined by 12 designated European long-distance paths over some 70,000 km (43,000 mi). Some other popular international routes include:

- GR (Grande Randonnée) footpaths in Belgium, France, Spain and the Netherlands
- Tour du Mont Blanc, circling the Mont Blanc massif in Italy, Switzerland, and France. It covers a distance of roughly 170 km (110 mi) with 10 km (6.2 mi) of elevation change.
- Haute Randonnée Pyrénéenne (HRP), 800 km (500 mi) along the length of the Pyrenees in France, Spain and Andorra
- Nordkalottleden Trail (Kalottireitti), 800 km (500 mi) in the northernmost parts of Finland, Sweden, and Norway (Lapland)
- St James's Way (Camino de Santiago de Compostela), with 2,530 km (1,570 mi) commonly walked through France and Spain, but also including old pilgrimage routes from as far afield as Poland and Portugal
- Peaks of the Balkans Trail, 192 km (119 mi) through Montenegro, Albania and Kosovo in the Accursed Mountains
- Sultans Trail 2,200 km (1,400 mi) in Austria, Slovakia, Hungary, Croatia, Serbia, Romania, Bulgaria, Greece, and Turkey

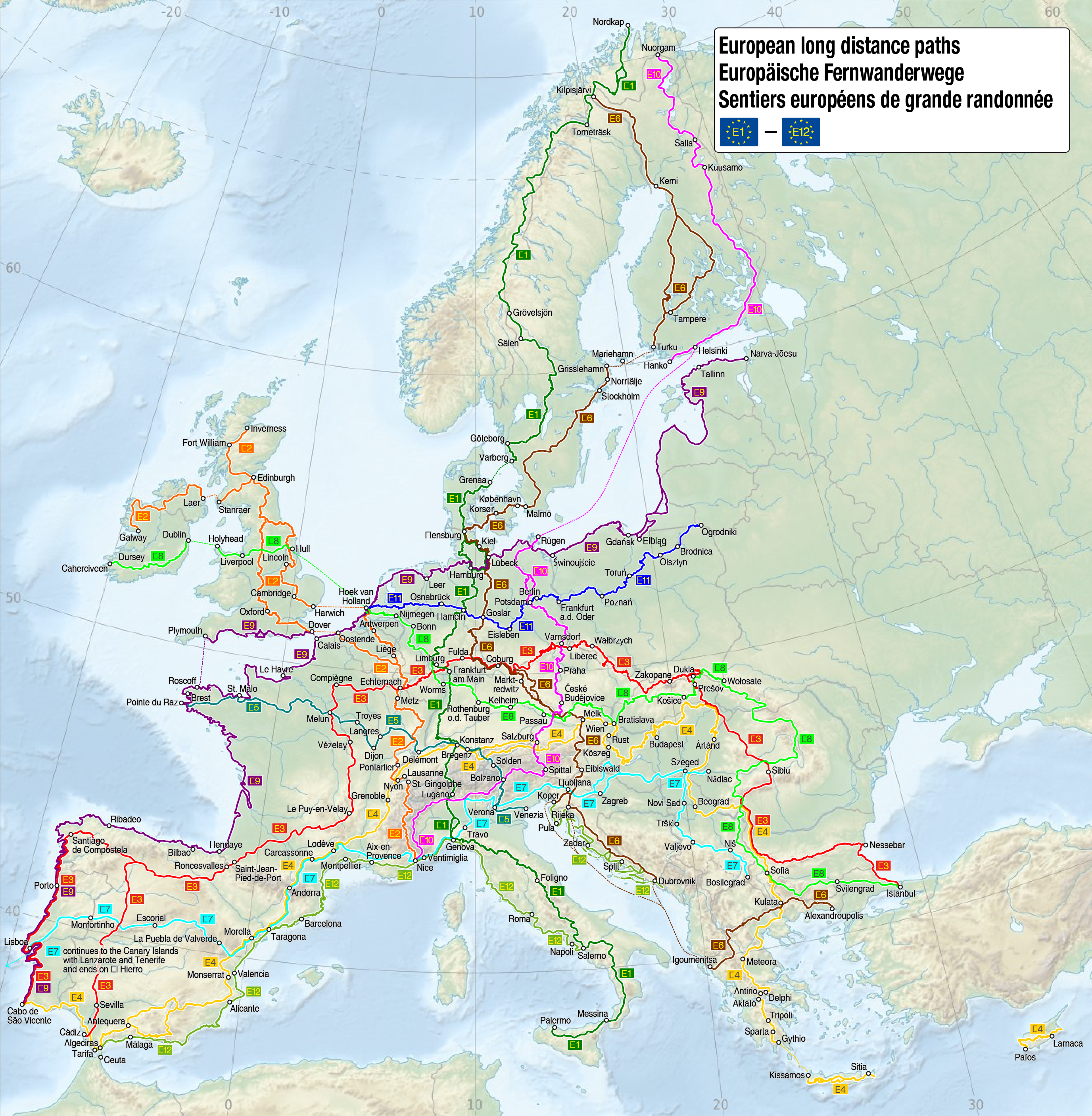
Map of European long-distance paths

- 5,000 km (3,100 mi) The Via Alpina network of Alpine trails
  - 1,500 km (930 mi) Red Trail
  - Violet Trail
  - Yellow Trail
  - Green Trail
  - Blue Trail
- Via Francigena from Canterbury to Rome
- it:Tratturo L'Aquila-Foggia from L'Aquila (Abruzzo region, Italy) to Foggia (Puglia region, Italy). At 244 km (152 mi), Tratturo Magno is the longest and the most important ancient route, traversed by shepherds in Transhumance
- The Via Dinarica from Slovenia to Montenegro via the Dinaric Alps connects Croatia, Bosnia and Herzegovina and Montenegro. The trail connects with Kosovo and Albania via the High Scardus Trail.

=== Austria ===
==== "10 great Austrian long-distance trails" ====
- North Alpine Trail 01 from Vienna or Lake Neusiedl to Lake Constance
- Central Alpine Trail 02 from Hainburg an der Donau to Feldkirch
- South Alpine Trail 03 from Bad Radkersburg to Sillian
- Pre-Alpine Trail 04 from Vienna to Salzburg and continued via Bavaria to Bregenz
- Nord-South-Trail 05 from Nebelstein to Eibiswald
- Pilgrimage Trails to Mariazell 06 connecting Eisenstadt, Vienna, Nebelstein, Linz, Salzburg, Klagenfurt and Eibiswald with Mariazell
- East-Austrian Borderland Trail 07 from Nebelstein to Bad Radkersburg
- Eisenwurzentrail 08 connecting the northernmost and the southernmost points of Austria
- Salzsteig Trail 09 following an old salt smugglers' route from Sternstein to Arnoldstein

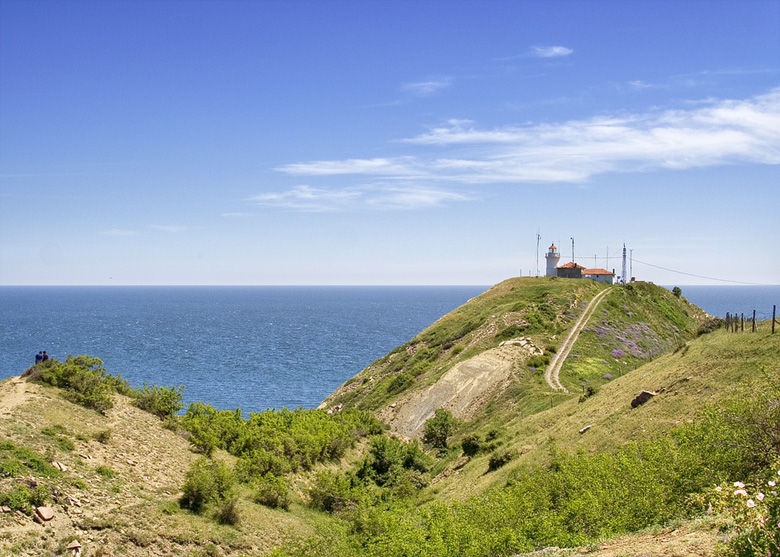
End of the Kom-Emine trail on the Black Sea

- Ruperti Trail 10 from Bärenstein to Nassfeld

==== Other important trails ====
- Arnoweg around the state of Salzburg
- Alpe Adria Trail, Austria, Slovenia, Italy

=== Bulgaria ===
- Kom-Emine 600 km (370 mi), from Mount Kom to Cape Emine (part of European walking route E3)

=== Czechia ===
- Polish–Czech Friendship Trail: trail along the Polish and Czech border in the Sudetes
- Czech Trail: first official Czech thru-hike trail, divided into a northern and southern branch, totaling 2,000 km (1243 mi)

=== Denmark ===
- Hærvejen, an ancient trail on the Jutland Peninsula.
- Øhavsstien 220 km (140 mi) around the archipelago of southern Denmark Fünen.
- Gendarmstien, 74 km (46 mi) following the border between Germany and Denmark.
- Bornholm Rundt. A walk around of the island of Bornholm (120 km (75 mi)).
- Camønoen A walk on the island of Møn (175 km (109 mi)).
- Sjællandsleden is a trail around Sjælland.
- Kyst til kyst stien A 140 km long hike across Jutland from Blåvandshuk to Vejle Map

=== Estonia ===
- Peraküla-Aegviidu-Ähijärve, 820 km (510 mi) from North-East to South-West Estonia
- Oandu-Aegviidu-Ikla, 375 km (233 mi) from North to South Estonia
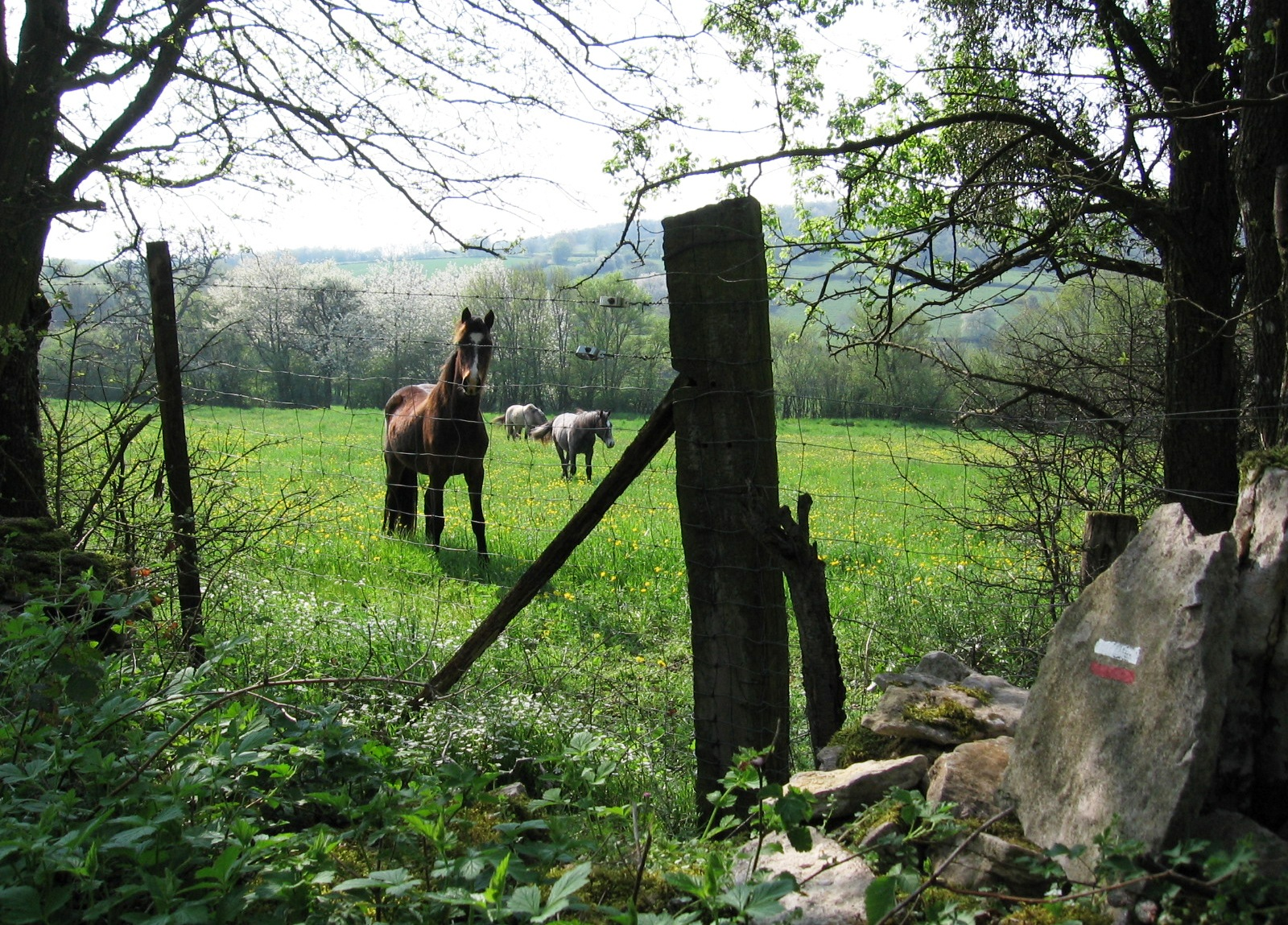
  Grande Randonnée path through a pasture in Saône-et-Loire

=== Finland ===
- The Karhunkierros Trail (80 km (50 mi), External link) in the municipalities of Kuusamo and Salla, Oulanka National Park, Lapland
- The Peuran polku Trail: (115 km (71 mi), External link) in the municipalities of Kivijärvi, Kinnula, Perho, Lestijärvi and Reisjärvi in Central Finland, Central Ostrobothnia, and Northern Ostrobothnia—a part of European walking route E6

=== France ===
- Sentier de Grande Randonnée (GR)
- Haute Randonnée Pyrénéenne (HRP): High Pyrenees Trail, along the border with Spain.
- The Tour du Lot: a circuit of over 500 km (310 mi) around the Department of the Lot's periphery.
- Sentier Métropolitain: urban and suburban hiking routes, that allow their users to discover a metropolitan territory in several days of hiking.
- Hexatrek: a 3000 km trail linking France's main mountain ranges.

=== Germany ===
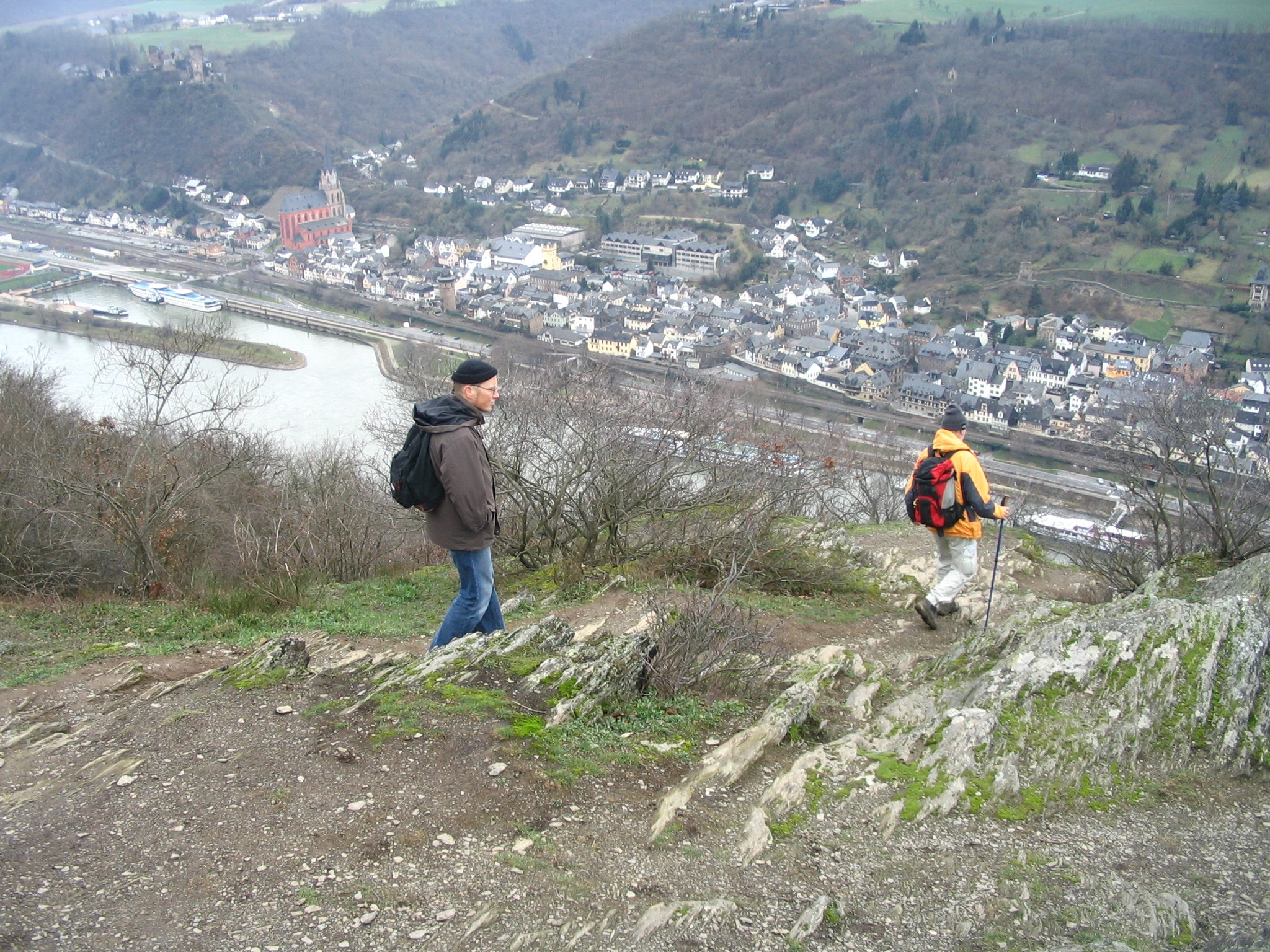
Hikers descending the Rheinsteig above Oberwesel

- Barbarossaweg: Korbach to Kyffhäuserdenkmal (332 km (206 mi))
- Bergischer Weg: Essen to Königswinter (137 km (85 mi))
- Birkenhainer Strasse: Hanau to Gemünden am Main (71 km (44 mi))
- Bonifatiusweg: Mainz to Fulda (180 km (110 mi))
- Christine-Koch-Weg: Menden to Bad Laasphe (123 km (76 mi))
- Eselsweg: Schlüchtern to Großheubach (111 km (69 mi))
- König-Ludwig-Weg: Berg am Starnberger See to Füssen (120 km (75 mi))
- Maximiliansweg: Lindau to Berchtesgaden (350 km (220 mi))
- Moselhöhenweg: Trier to Koblenz
- Pandurensteig: Waldmuenchen to Passau
- Rennsteig: Hörsel to Blankenstein/Saale through the Thuringian Forest (169 km (105 mi))
- Rheinburgenweg Trail: Bingen to Koblenz to Rüdesheim am Rhein (c.200 km (120 mi))
- Rheinhöhenweg Trail: Bonn to Alsheim/Wiesbaden (530 km (330 mi))
- Rheinsteig: Bonn to Wiesbaden (320 km (200 mi))
- Westweg (Black Forest western ridgeway): Pforzheim to Basel (279 km (173 mi))
- Mittelweg (Black Forest central ridgeway): Pforzheim to Waldshut (233 km (145 mi))
- Ostweg (Black Forest eastern ridgeway): Pforzheim to Schaffhausen (238 km (148 mi))
- Black Forest North Perimeter Way: Mühlacker to Karlsruhe (71 km (44 mi))
- Two Valleys Trail: round hiking trail from/to Waldkirch (106 km (66 mi))

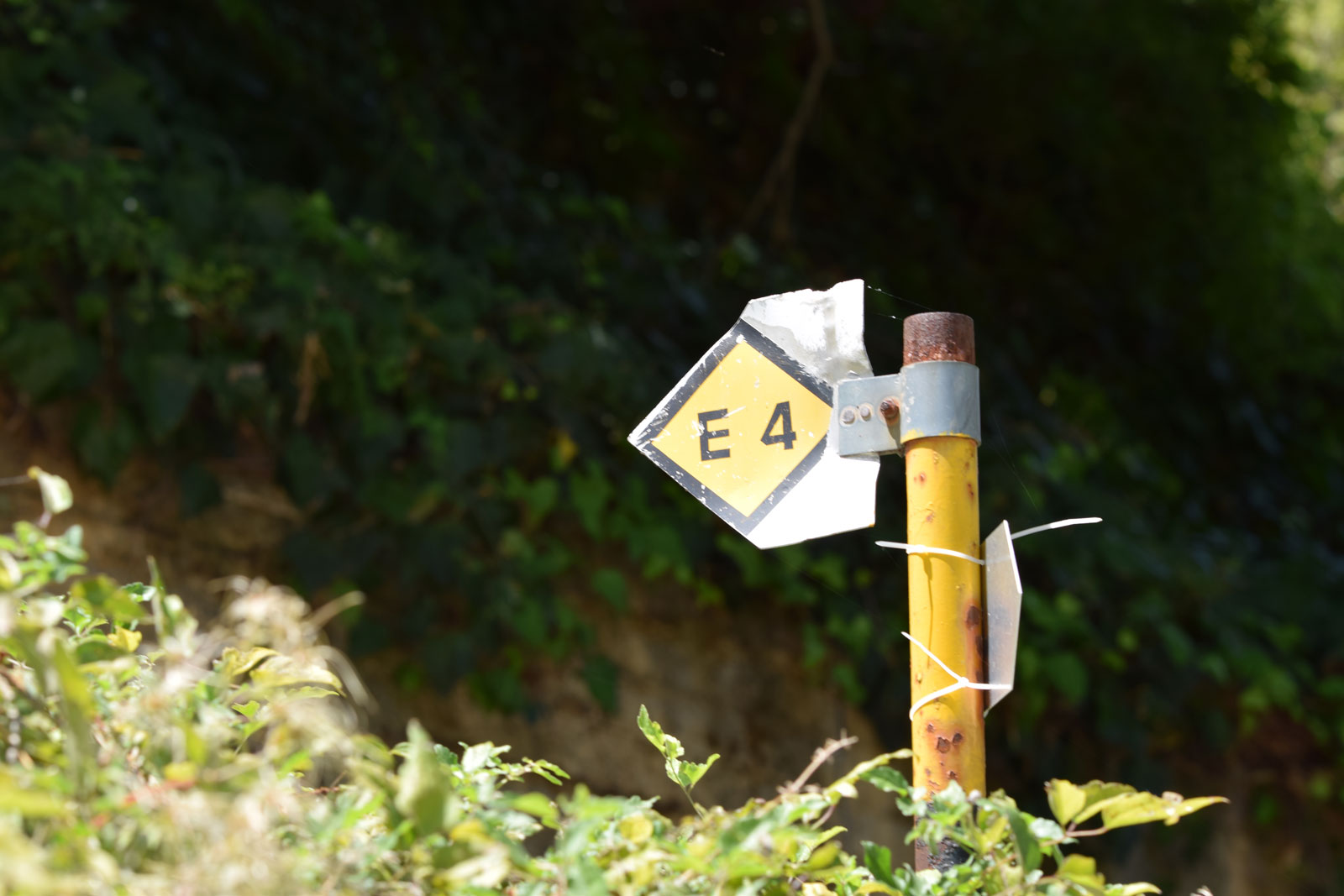
E4 European path sign in the village Ano Doliana of Arcadia, Peloponnese, Greece

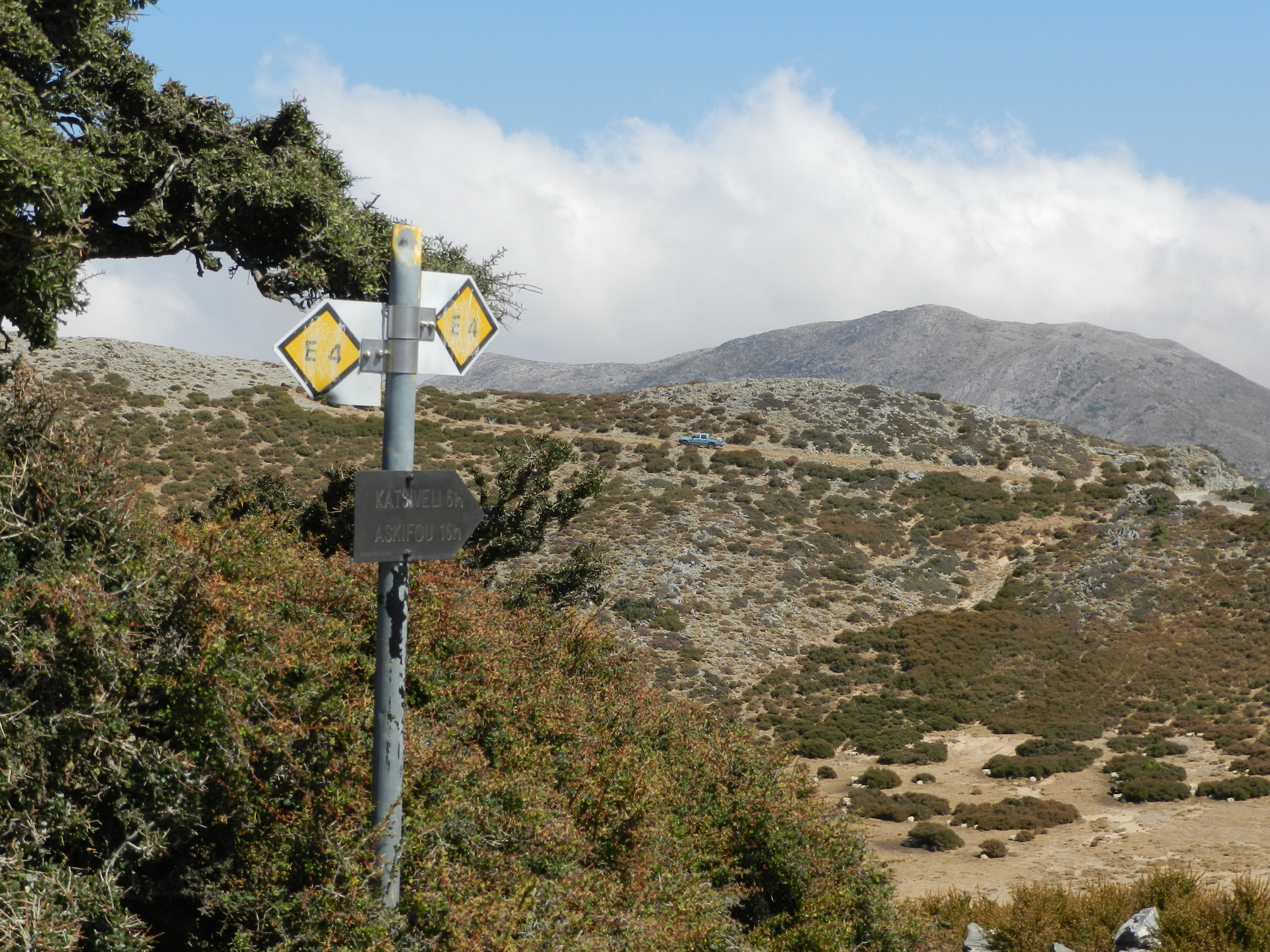
E4 walking route in Crete

- Freiburg-Lake Constance Black Forest Trail: Freiburg to Konstanz (183 km (114 mi))
- Saar-Hunsrück-Steig: Trier to Saarschleife in Mettlach or Idar-Oberstein 9 (180 km (110 mi))
- Westfalenwanderweg: Hattingen to Altenbergen (216 km (134 mi))
- Goldsteig: Marktredwitz to Passau (660 km (410 mi))

=== Greece ===
- European walking route E4 (Florina to Agios Nikolaos)
- European walking route E6 (Igoumenitsa to Alexandroupoli)

=== Hungary ===
- National Blue Trail: 1,168 km (726 mi) connecting several World Heritage Sites

=== Iceland ===
- Laugavegur: 80 km (50 mi) from Landmannalaugar to Skógar via Thórsmörk mountain ridge

=== Italy ===
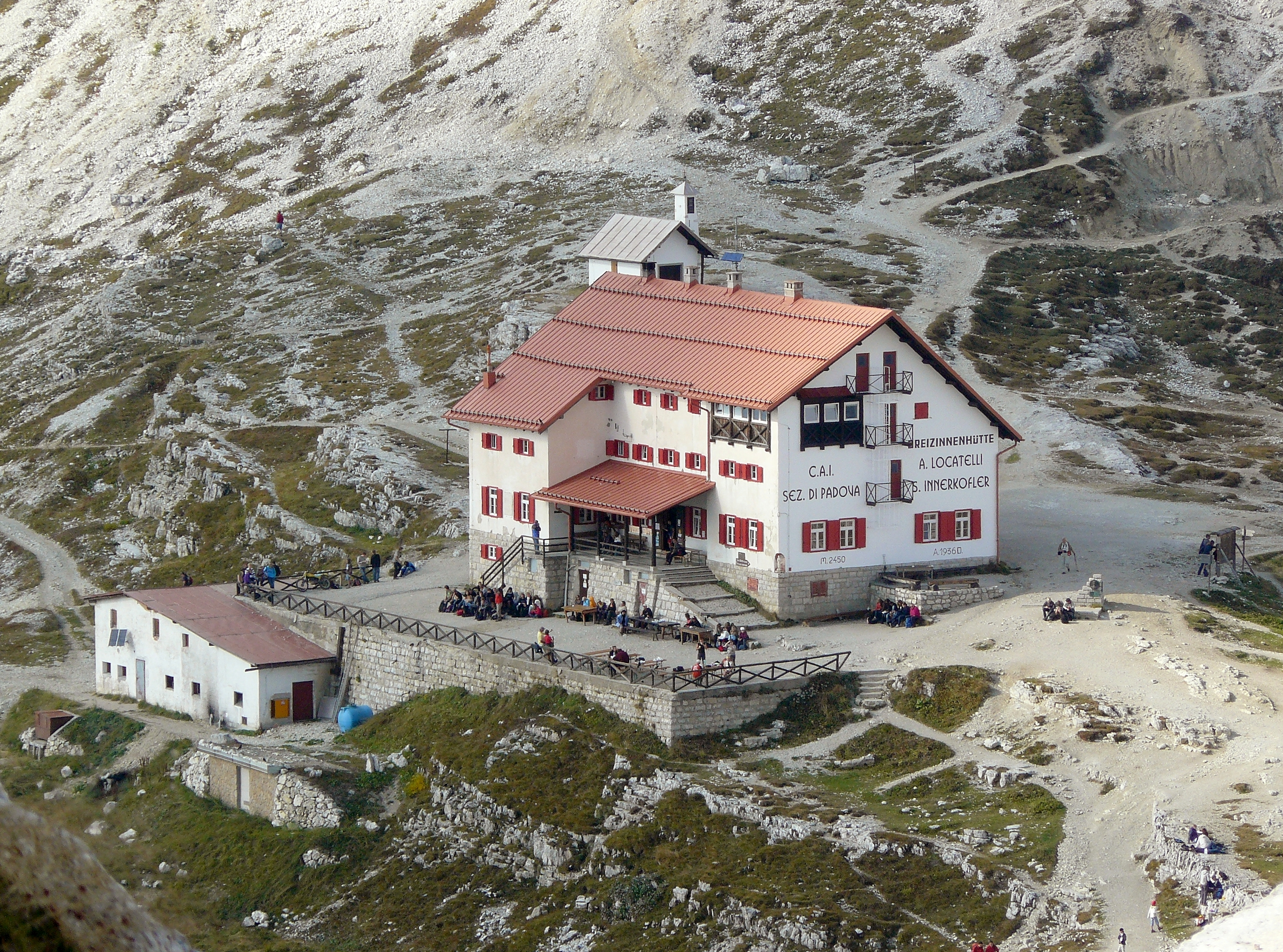
Antonio Locatelli Hut on the Grand Italian Trail

- Grand Italian Trail (Sentiero Italia): nationwide trail of more than 6,000 km (3,700 mi) length
- Via Francigena: pilgrimage route across Italy to Rome from France
- Emilia-Romagna: Via degli Dei is a path 135 km (84 mi) that crosses the Apennines from Bologna to Florence.
- Dolomites:
  - Dolomites Classical High Route (no.1) from Braies Lake to Belluno
  - High Route of the Legends (no.2) from Brixen to Feltre
  - Dolomites High Route of the Chamoi (no.3) from Villabassa to Longarone
  - Dolomites Grohmann's High Route (no.4) from San Candido in Pusteria to Pieve di Cadore
  - Dolomites Titans's High Route (no.5) from Sesto in Pusteria to Pieve di Cadore
  - Dolomites High Route of Silence (no.6) from Pieve d'Alpago to Vittorio Veneto
  - Dolomites Patera's High Route (no.7) from Ponte nelle Alpi to Tambre d'Alpago
  - Dolomites High Route of the Heroes (no.8) from Feltre to Bassano del Grappa
  - Dolomites High Route (n. 9): the Trasversale from Bolzano to Santo Stefano di Cadore
  - Dolomites High Route (n. 10) of Giudicarie from Bolzano to the Garda Lake
- Liguria:
  - Liguria: From Portovenere to Camogli hiking trail along the sea
  - Alta Via dei Monti Liguri
  - Sentiero Azzurro is a trail along a rugged portion of coast on the Italian Riviera that connects the five towns known as the Cinque Terre in Liguria, Italy
- Lombardy
  - Il Sentiero del Viandante The "Wayfarer's trail" from Lecco to Colico on the east side of Lake Como.
  - Il Sentiero delle 4 Valli The "Four Valleys Path" between Lake Como and Lake Lugano
  - La Via dei Monti Lariani: The Monti Lariani trail on the west side of Lake Como, from Cernobbio to Sorico
- Piedmont
  - Grande Traversata delle Alpi (GTA): 55 days in the Alps of Piedmont
- Tuscany
  - Grande Escursione Appenninica (Great Apennines Walk): largely along the ridge of the Apennine Mountains
- Sardinia
  - Selvaggio Blu
- Sicily
  - Magna Via Francigena: from Palermo to Agrigento

=== Montenegro ===
- Primorska planinarska transverzala (Coastal Mountain Transversal), from Herceg Novi to Bar, 180 km (110 mi)
- Crnogorska Transverzala (Montenegrin Transversal), from Durmitor to Kučka Krajina, 140 km (87 mi)

=== Netherlands ===
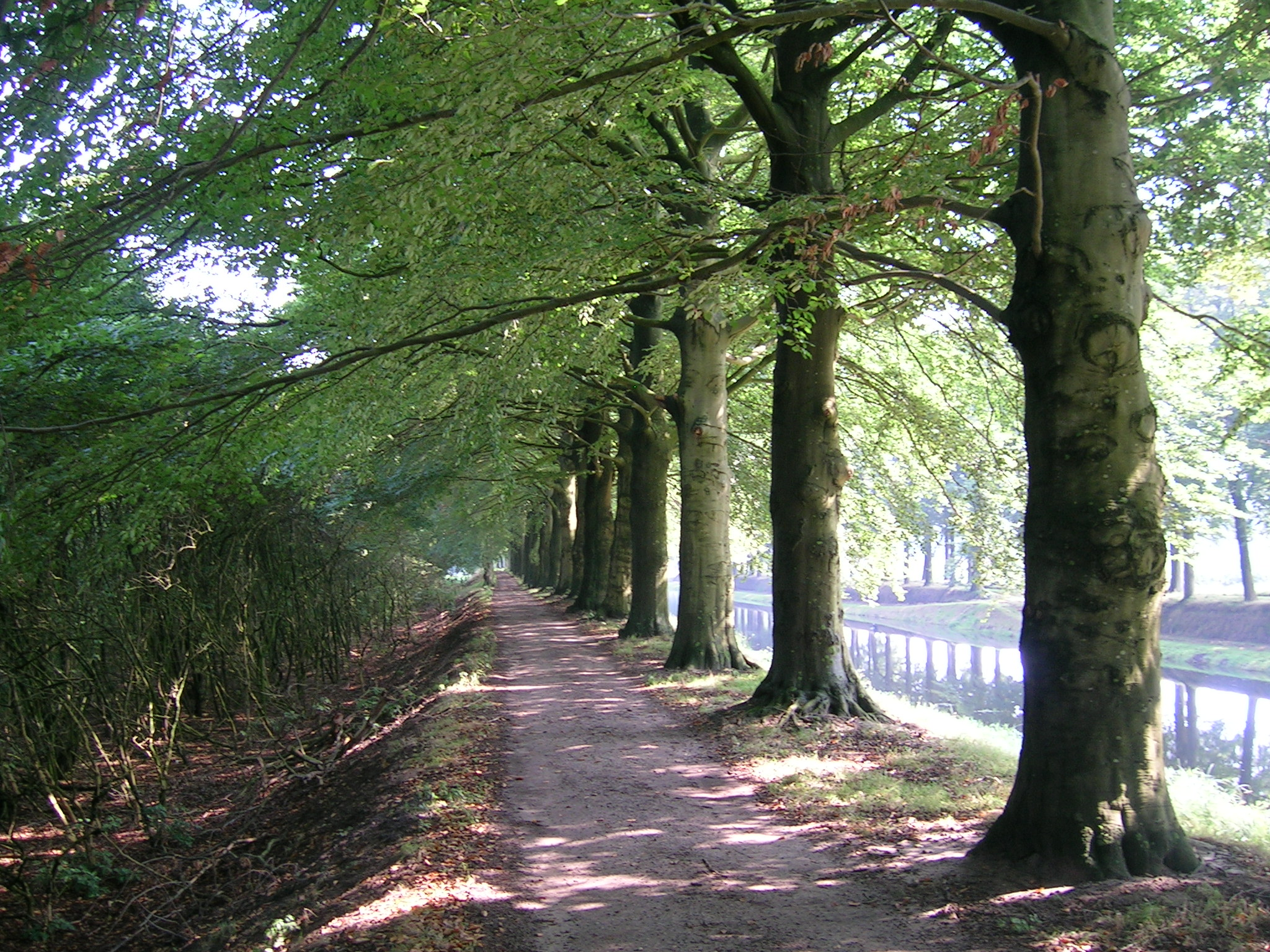
Pieterpad trail near Hellendoorn and Laren, Netherlands

- Zevenwoudenpad from Lauwersoog to Steenwijk (200 km (120 mi))
- Pionierspad from Steenwijk to Muiden (200 km (120 mi))
- Floris V-pad from Amsterdam to Bergen op Zoom (245 km (152 mi))
- Trekvogelpad from Bergen aan Zee to Enschede (380 km (240 mi))
- Marskramerpad from Bad Bentheim to Den Haag (360 km (220 mi))
- Maarten van Rossumpad from 's-Hertogenbosch to Ommen (308 km (191 mi))
- Deltapad from Sluis to Hook of Holland (237 km (147 mi))
- Hollands Kustpad from Hook of Holland to Den Helder (213 km (132 mi))
- Friese Kustpad from Stavoren to Lauwersoog (131 km (81 mi))
- Wad- en Wierdenpad from Lauwersoog to Nieuweschans (123 km (76 mi))
- Oeverloperpad from Rotterdam Europoort to Leerdam (232 km (144 mi))
- Lingepad from Leerdam to Nijmegen (German border) (98 km (61 mi))
- Pelgrimspad from Amsterdam to Maastricht (453 km (281 mi))
- Zuiderzeepad from Enkhuizen to Stavoren (400 km (250 mi))
- Pieterpad from Pieterburen to the Sint Pietersberg (492 km (306 mi))
- Noaberpad from Nieuweschans to Emmerich (363 km (226 mi))
- Grenslandpad from Sluis to Thorn (363 km (226 mi))
- Overijssels Havezatenpad from Oldenzaal to Steenwijk (272 km (169 mi))
- Peellandpad from 's-Hertogenbosch to Roermond (160 km (99 mi))
- Airbornepad from the Belgian border to Arnhem

=== Norway ===
- Bergen Trail (Norwegian: Bergensstien): 441 km (274 mi) from Oslo to Bergen
- Jotunheimen Trail (Norwegian: Jotunheimstien): 320 km (200 mi) from downtown Oslo to Lake Gjende in Jotunheimen
- Nordkalottruta (Finnish: Kalottireitti, Swedish: Nordkalottleden): 800 km (500 mi) from Kautokeino (located in Finnmark, Northern Norway) to Sulitjelma (Norway) or alternately Kvikkjokk (Sweden)
- Rondane Trail (Norwegian: Rondanestien): 437 km (272 mi) from downtown Oslo to Hjerkinn

=== Poland ===
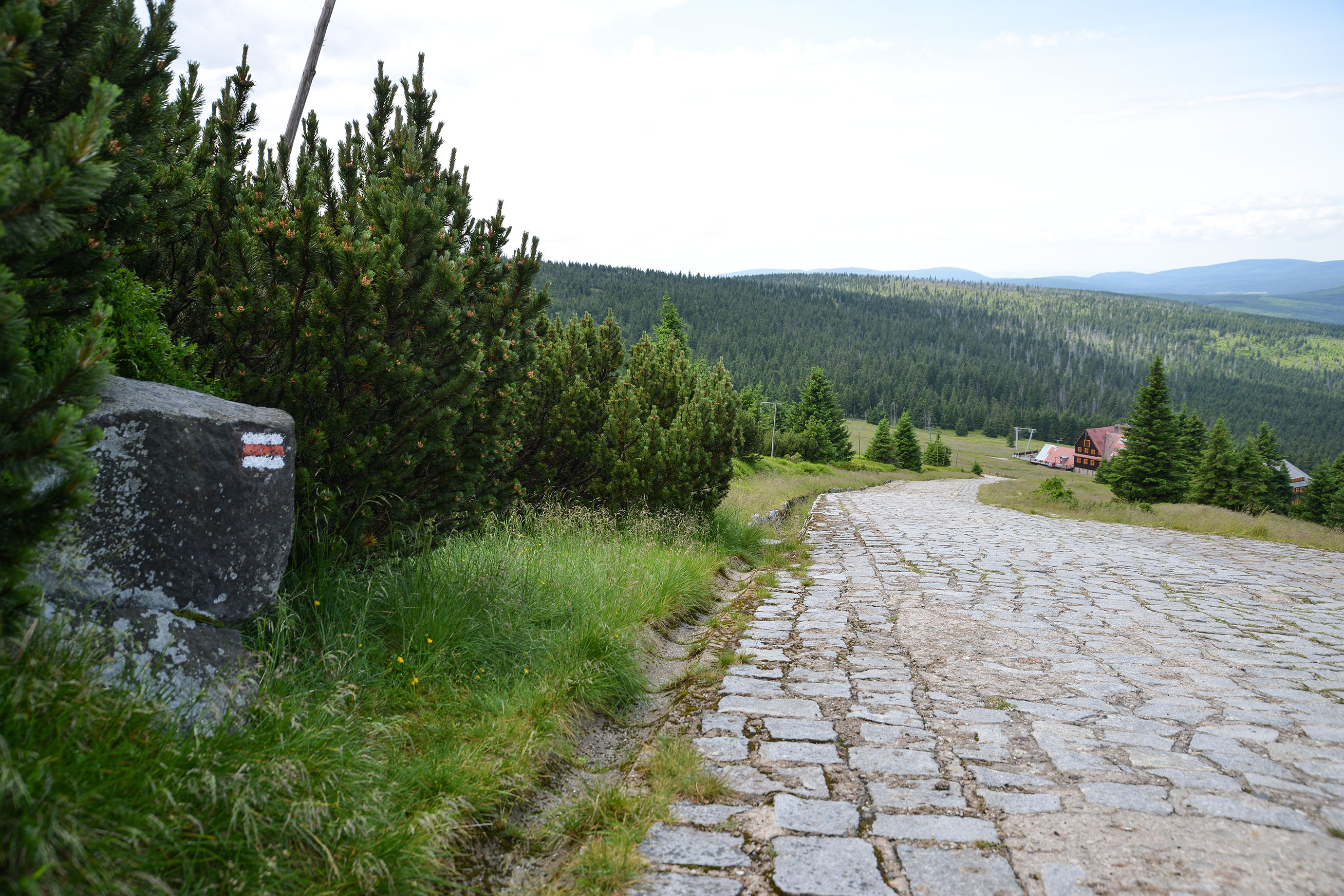
Cobblestone road along Glowny Szlak Sudecki

- Główny Szlak Sudecki (Main Sudety Trail): 440 km (270 mi) in Sudetes Mountains from Świeradów Zdrój to Prudnik
- Główny Szlak Beskidzki (Main Beskidy Trail): 519 km (322 mi) in Beskids Mountains, from Wołosate to Ustroń, the longest public trail in Poland
- Polish - Czech Friendship Trail: trail along the Polish and Czech border in Sudetes

=== Portugal ===
- Fisherman's Trail: 226 km (140 mi) along the cliffs of southern Portugal
- Rota Vicentina

=== Romania ===
- Via Transilvanica - Length: 1,428 km (887 mi)

=== Serbia ===
- The Fruška Gora Transversal (Serbian: Fruškogorska Transverzala) – circular trail around Fruška Gora mountain – 160 km (100 mi)
- The Small Toplica Transversal (Serbian: Mala Toplička Transverzala) – 122 km (76 mi)

=== Slovakia ===
- The SNP Heroes Trail, 770 km (480 mi) from Dukla Pass to Devín, across mountainous regions of Slovakia

=== Slovenia ===
- Slovenian Mountain Hiking Trail 599 km (372 mi) from east (Maribor) to west (Ankaran)

=== Spain ===
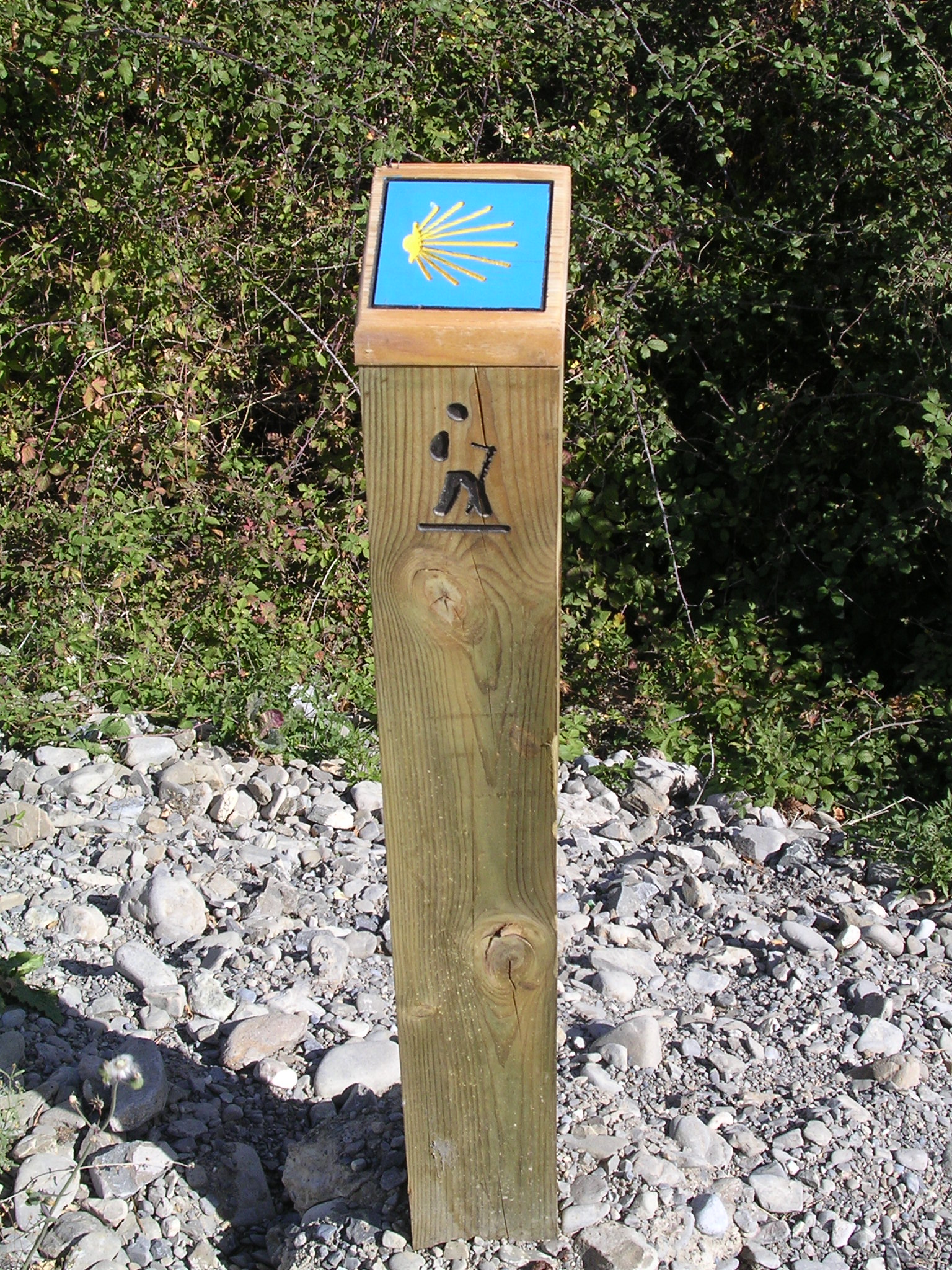
Camino de Santiago pilgrimage trail marker in Huesca, Spain

- Way of St. James (Spanish: El Camino de Santiago)
- Route of the Monasteries of Valencia (Spanish: Ruta de los Monasterios de Valencia)
- Grande Randonnée 7 (GR 7): From Tarifa to the mountain cabin of Fontferrera, part of the E4 route.
- Grande Randonnée 11 (GR 11): Pyrenees Trail, staying within Spain.
- Haute Randonnée Pyrénéenne (HRP): High Pyrenees Trail, along the border with France.
- Way of the Lighthouses: 200 km (120 mi) along the coastline from Malpica to Fisterra, in Galicia (Spain)

=== Sweden ===
- Kungsleden, 425 km (264 mi) from the northern extremity of the country
- Sörmlandsleden 1,000 km (620 mi) of winding paths through the county of Sörmland.
- Bohusleden 360 km (220 mi) past at Göteborg, Uddevalla, Munkedal and ends finally in Strömstad
- Ingegerdsleden, 110 km (68 mi), pilgrimage route in county of Uppland between Uppsala Cathedral and Stockholm Cathedral.
- Skåneleden, more than 1,000 km (620 mi) long path through the province of Scania. Part of the North Sea Trail.

=== United Kingdom ===
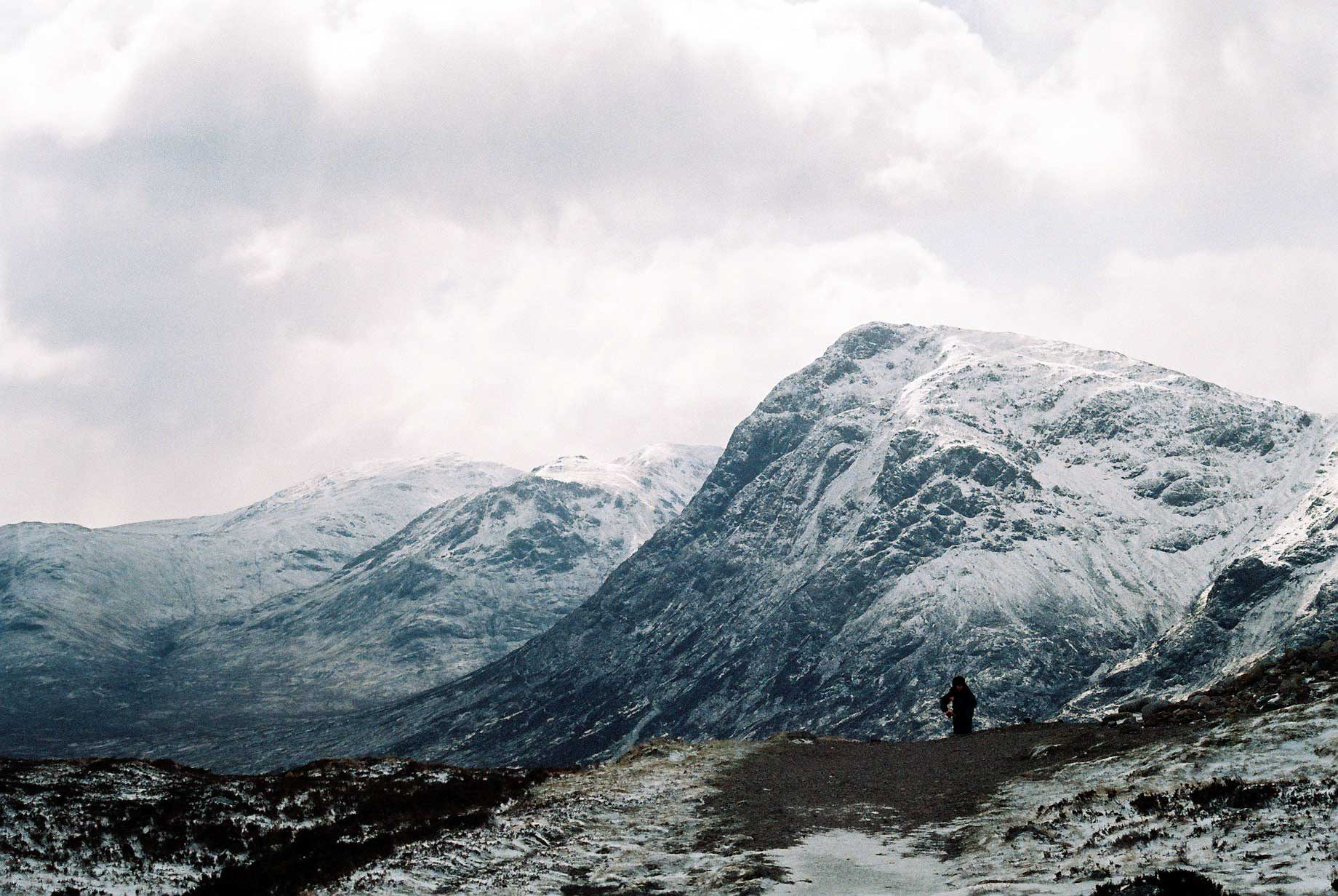
The Devil's Staircase path in the Scottish Highlands is part of the West Highland Way

Some of the best-known National Trails in England and Wales include:

- Cleveland Way, 177 km (110 mi) on the moors and coastline of North Yorkshire
- Offa's Dyke Path, 285 km (177 mi) along the Anglo–Welsh border
- Pembrokeshire Coast Path, 299 km (186 mi) through the Pembrokeshire Coast National Park in southeast Wales
- Pennine Way, 431 km (268 mi) through northern England to the Scottish border
- South West Coast Path, 1,014 km (630 mi) along the Devon and Cornwall coasts
- The Wales Coast Path follows the entire coastline of the country over some 1,400 km (870 mi).
- Scotland's Great Trails is a network of 29 paths primarily used by hikers.

== North America ==
=== Canada ===
- The Trans-Canada Trail is a trail system of over 24,000 km (15,000 mi) extending throughout Canada

==== Western Canada ====
- Alexander MacKenzie Heritage Trail (or Blackwater Trail), 420 km (260 mi) in British Columbia
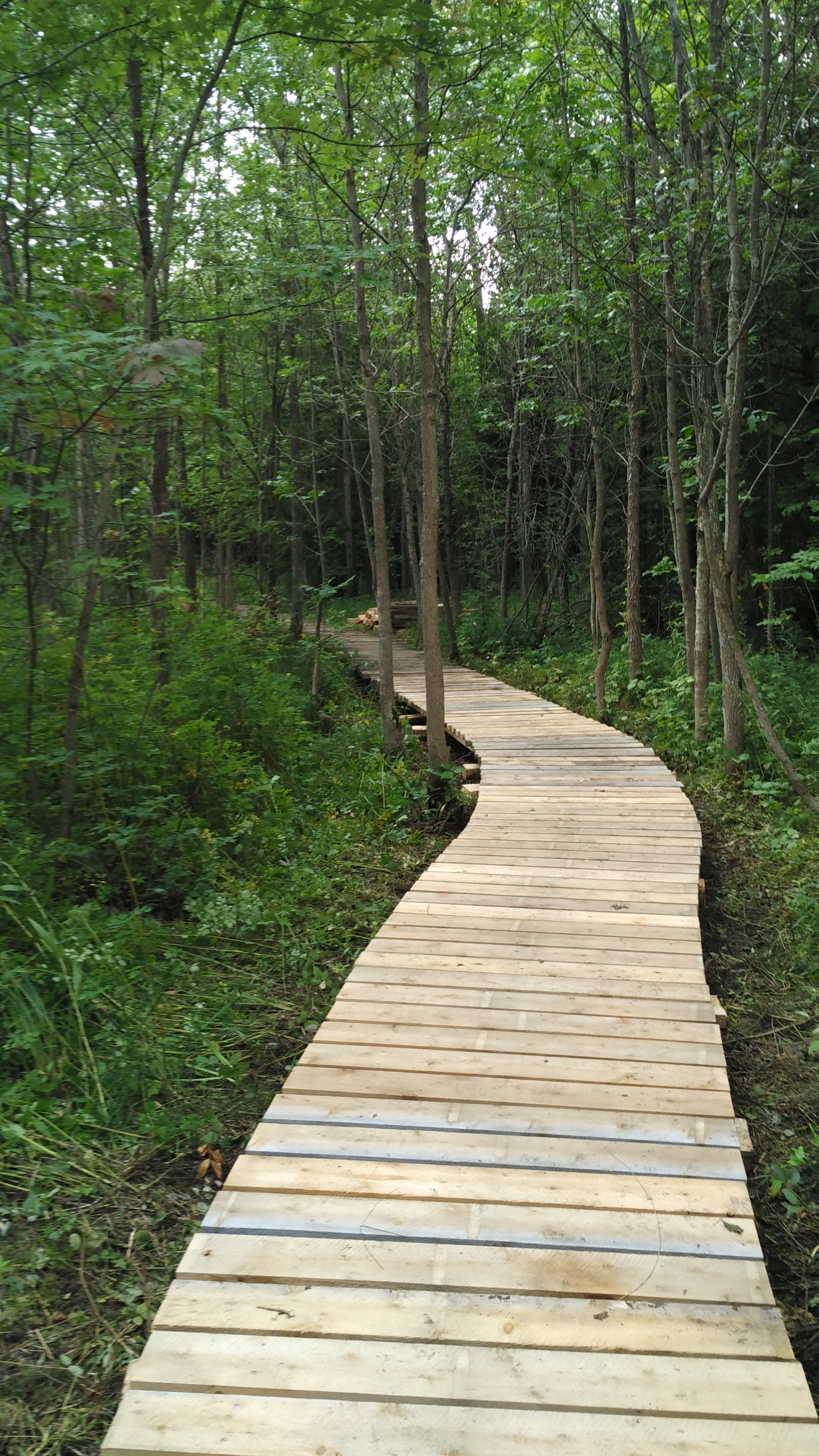
  Planked segment of the Bruce Trail
- Chilkoot Trail, 53 km (33 mi) in British Columbia and Alaska, USA
- Great Divide Trail, 1,200 km (750 mi) in the Canadian Rockies straddling Alberta and British Columbia
- Juan de Fuca Trail (47 km (29 mi)) and West Coast Trail 75 km (47 mi) on Vancouver Island, BC
- Monkman Pass Memorial Trail, 63 km (39 mi) in British Columbia
- Sunshine Coast Trail, 180 km (110 mi) in British Columbia
- Vancouver Island Trail, 800 km (500 mi) in British Columbia

==== Ontario ====
- Bruce Trail, 890 km (550 mi) via the Niagara Escarpment through southern Ontario
- Capital Pathway, 220 km (140 mi) around the National Capital Region
- La Cloche Silhouette Trail, 78 km (48 mi) in the La Cloche Mountains of Killarney Provincial Park
- Rideau Trail, 387 km (240 mi) linking Ottawa and Kingston
- Voyageur Hiking Trail, 600 km (370 mi) along the coastlines of Lakes Superior and Huron
- Mantario Trail, 63 km (39 mi) in southeastern Manitoba and Ontario

==== Quebec ====
- Sentier des Caps, 51 km (32 mi)
- Traversée de Charlevoix, 105 km (65 mi)
- Vallée Bras-du-Nord, 50.3 km (31.3 mi)

==== Atlantic Canada ====
- East Coast Trail, 540 km (340 mi) in Newfoundland
- Fundy Footpath, 41 km (25 mi) in New Brunswick
- International Appalachian Trail, 3,000 km (1,900 mi) from the US border via New Brunswick, the Gaspé Peninsula, and through Newfoundland and Labrador by ferry

=== Greenland ===
- Arctic Circle Trail, some 165 km (103 mi) in an ice-free patch of western Greenland

=== Mexico ===
The following two trails also connect to the United States:

- Camino Real de Tierra Adentro, 2,560 km (1,590 mi), 1,910 km (1,190 mi) in Mexico.
- Juan Bautista de Anza National Historic Trail, 3,100 km (1,900 mi), 1,150 km (710 mi) in Mexico.

=== Panama ===
- TransPanama Trail, 1,100 km (700 miles)

=== United States ===
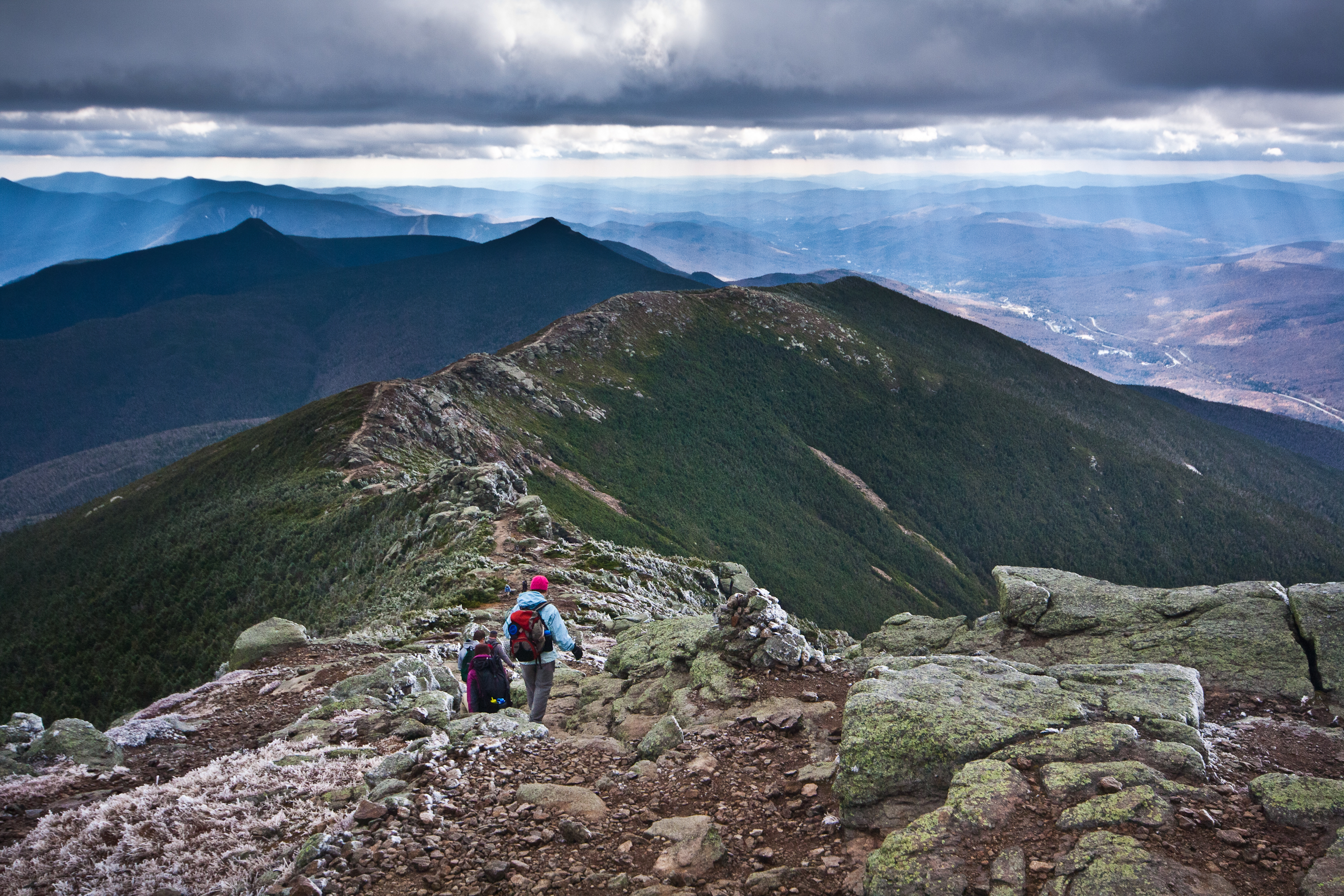
Appalachian Trail in the Franconia Range, New Hampshire

Three famous north–south trails spanning the USA comprise the Triple Crown of Hiking:

- Appalachian Trail, 3,500 km (2,200 mi) long connecting Georgia and Maine via the Appalachian Mountains and other mountain ranges
- Continental Divide Trail, 5,000 km (3,100 mi) running from Mexico to Canada through New Mexico, Colorado, Wyoming, Idaho, and Montana
- Pacific Crest Trail, 4,270 km (2,653 mi) from Mexico to Canada via the Sierra Nevada and Cascade ranges of the West Coast

Other popular trails include:

- John Muir Trail in central California, mostly along the Pacific Crest Trail in the central Sierra, 340 km (210 mi)
- Tahoe Rim Trail in California and Nevada, 266 km (165 mi)
- Long Trail through Vermont, 438 km (272 mi)
- Pacific Northwest Trail from the Washington coast to the North American continental divide in Montana, 1,900 km (1,200 mi)
- Colorado Trail from southwestern Colorado to the Denver suburbs, 782 km (486 mi)
- Arizona Trail running the length of the state north - south, 1,270 km (789 mi)
- Ouachita National Recreation Trail in Oklahoma and Arkansas, 359 km (223 mi)
- River to River Trail in southern Illinois, 260 km (160 mi)
- Florida Trail running the length of the state, 1,600 km (1,000 mi) built with some 480 km (300 mi) planned

== Oceania ==
=== New Zealand ===
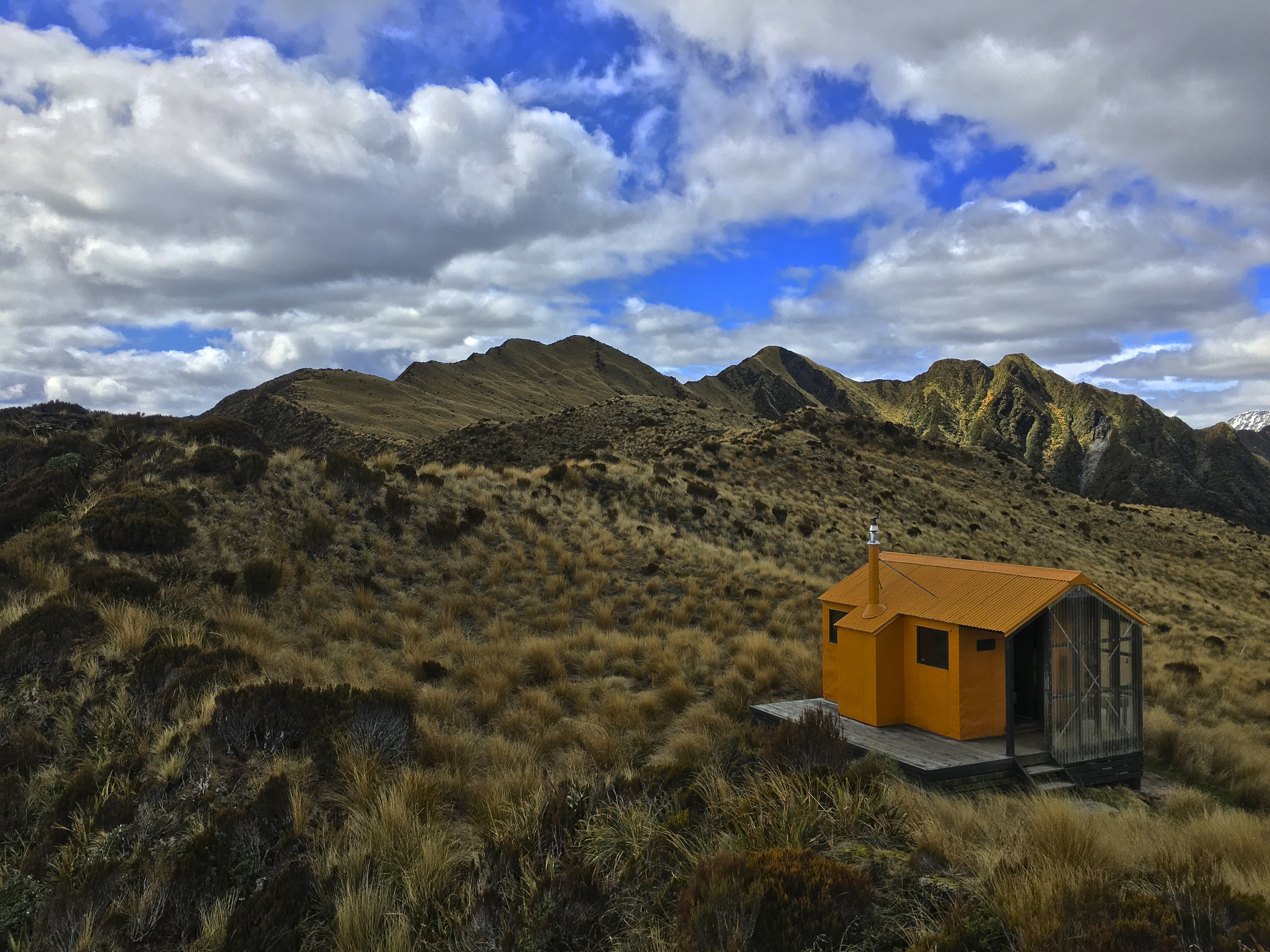
Mountain hut at Lake Kaniere, New Zealand

- Te Araroa, 3,000 km (1,900 mi) stretching from Cape Reinga in the north of New Zealand to Bluff in the south.
- New Zealand Great Walks, ten popular backcountry hikes

== Central and South America ==
=== Argentina ===
- Los Glaciares
  - Various options to Laguna Torre, Cerro FitzRoy, or even out onto the Southern Patagonian Ice Field
- Huella Andina
  - 570 km (350 mi) from Alumine Lake to Baggilt lake

=== Bolivia ===
- Cordillera Real (Bolivia)
  - 106 km (66 mi) 7-day Illampu Circuit

=== Brazil ===
- Atlantic Forest Trail 4,270 km (2,400 mi) follows the Serra do Mar mountain range, crossing five Brazilian States and connecting 10 national parks, and many historical trails and traditional communities. (very hard trail)
- Transmantiqueira Trail
  - 1,200 km (750 mi) crosses the Mantiqueira range in a west–east direction (very hard trail)
- Petrópolis Teresópolis Traverse
  - 36 km (22 mi) between Petrópolis and Teresópolis (medium to hard trail)
- Transcarioca Trail
  - 183 km (114 mi) in Rio de Janeiro city (medium to hard trail)
- Caminho da Fé
  - 538 km (334 mi). There are 3 different starting points:
    - from Sao Carlos to Aparecida, São Paulo
    - or from Cravinhos to Aparecida
    - or from Mococa to Aparecida

=== Costa Rica ===
280 km from Atlantic to Pacific coasts of Costa Rica

- El Camino de Costa Rica

=== Chile ===
- Central Chile and Patagonia
  - 3,000 km (1,900 mi) Greater Patagonian Trail from the capital Santiago de Chile to the Southern Patagonian Ice Field.
- Magallanes
  - 118 km (73 mi). Full circuit of Torres del Paine, including Valle del Francés and access to the base of Torres del Paine.
  - Dientes de Navarino Circuit ≈53 km (33 mi). 3‑7 days. Starts out of Puerto Williams. Access from mainland Chile by ferry from Punta Areas, plane or from Ushuaia.

=== Peru ===
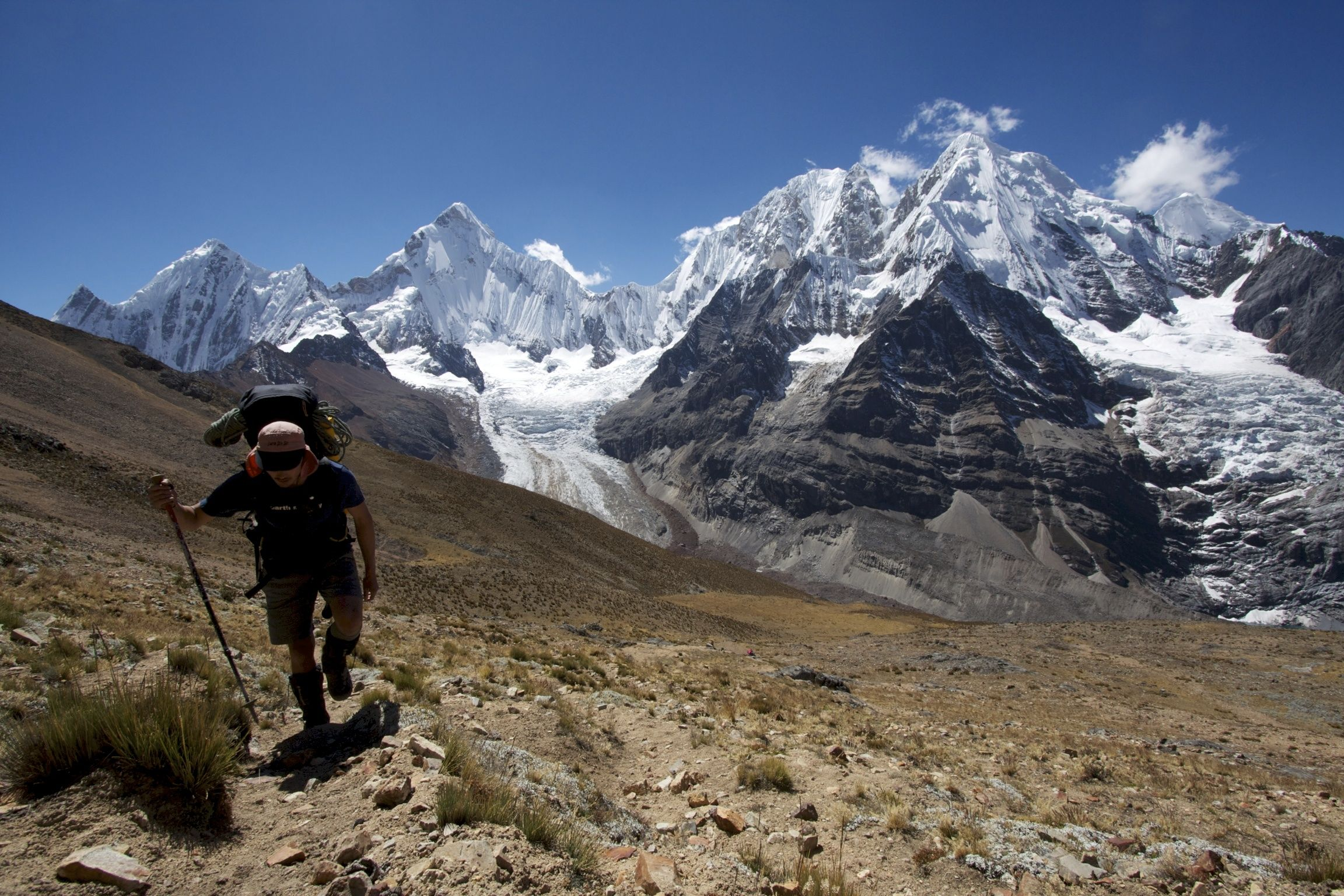
Trekker in the Huayhuash mountains

- Cordillera Blanca and Huayhuash mountain range near Huaráz
  - 30 km (19 mi) 10- to 14-day trek on the Huayhuash Circuit
  - 52 km (32 mi) 3- to 4-day "W" Circuit Santa Cruz trek
  - 94 km (58 mi) 6- to 10-day Alpamayo Circuit, full "O" Circuit
- Sacred Valley & Vilcanota mountain range near Cuzco
  - 88 km (55 mi) for the longest Mollepata variant of the Inca trail, with options for a single day to more than six days, all ending at Machu Picchu
  - 32 km (20 mi) Cachora to Choquequirao trek
  - 80 km (50 mi) 5- to 6-day trek on Ausangate Circuit
- Colca Canyon near Arequipa
  - 60 km (37 mi) 5-day trek around Canyon or other single-day and multi-day hikes
