= Siyahatnama =

Siyahatnama (from Classical Persian سیاحتنامه siyāḥatnāma, lit. 'travel book'; Iranian Persian: سیاحتنامه siyâḥatnâme; Ottoman Turkish: سیاحتنامه seyâḥatnâme; Urdu: سیاحتنامہ siyāḥatnāma) may refer to:

- Seyahatnâme, a 17th-century Ottoman Turkish travelogue by Evliya Çelebi
- Seyahatname, one of the generic Turkish words for a written travelogue
- Siyahatnama, a 19th-century Urdu travelogue by Abd al-Karim Khan Jhajjari
- The Travel Diary of Ebrahim Beg (Siyâhatnâme-ye Ebrâhim-Beyg), a 19th-century fictional Persian travelogue by Zeyn al-Abedin Maraghei
