= Saint Paul Trail =

Footpath from Perge to Yalvaç, Turkey

The Saint Paul Trail is a long-distance footpath in Turkey, approximately 500 km long. The trail begins in Perge, about 10 km east of Antalya, and it ends in Yalvaç, Isparta, northeast of Lake Eğirdir. A second branch starts at the Oluk Köprüsü (Roman Bridge over the Köprülü River), 100 km north-east of Antalya, and joins the main route at the ancient Roman site of Adada.

The name of the trail is derived from the fact that a part of it follows the route Saint Paul the Apostle took on his first missionary journey to Anatolia. It starts at sea level and climbs to 2200 m in elevation. It is marked along the way with red and white stripes to Grande Randonnée standards.

The trail is one of a group of trails associated with the Culture Routes Society of Turkey. The organization publishes a guidebook for the Saint Paul Trail, and in September 2011 released a digital guidebook iPhone application that provides users with GPS navigation and localized information about trail attractions and amenities.

== See also ==
- List of long-distance footpaths
- Lycian Way
- Evliya Çelebi Way

== Other sources ==
- Kate Clow (with Terry Richardson). St Paul Trail: Turkey's Second Long Distance Walking Route. Upcountry, 2004, ISBN 978-0-9539218-1-2.
- Goodwin, Stephen (July 25, 2004). "Return of the Saint: On the road from Perge to Antioch". The Independent on Sunday.
- "St. Paul was here: Antioch in 'Pisida'". Today's Zaman, 9 January 2008.
