= Haifa Wadis Trail =

- Length: 50 kilometres (31 mi)
- Location: Haifa
- Established: 2014
- Use: Hiking
- Website: www.facebook.com/WadisTrail

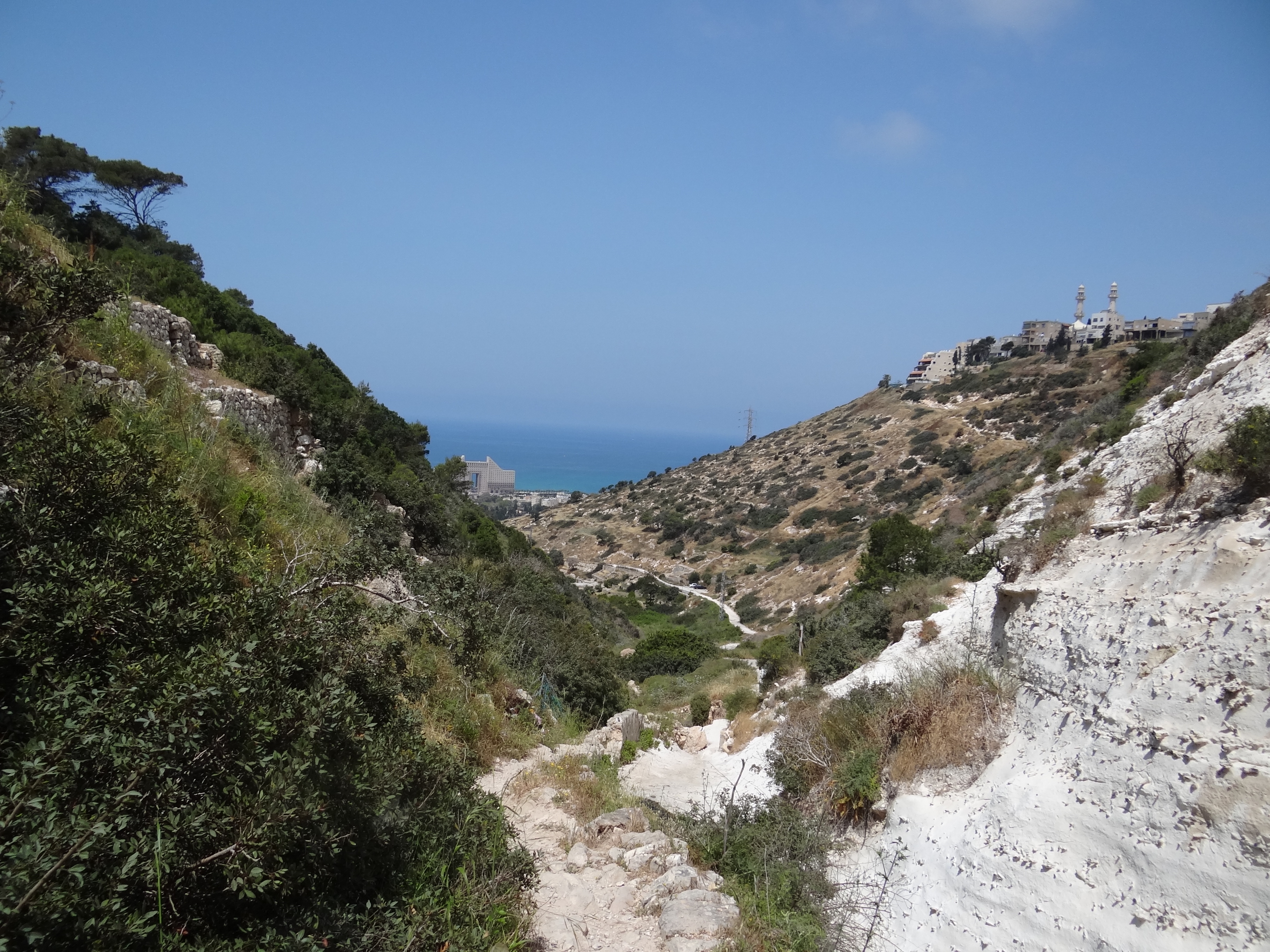
Nahal Siah, Haifa

The Haifa Wadis Trail, (Hebrew: שביל ואדיות חיפה, Shvil Vadiot Haifa) is a hiking path that extends the Israel National Trail into Haifa. This trail that was formed and maintained by Yarok Balev NGO forms a complete hiking circuit of approximately 50 kilometres (31 mi) through the wadis of Mount Carmel.

The trail is partially marked, and it takes an average of 3 days to hike it as a whole. It has been opened to the public since April 2014, and was officially launched in March 2015 after actually marking it.

The trail passes along cultural and historical landmarks and through national parks around Haifa. It passes near the Bahá'í Gardens, Mahmood Mosque in Kababir, Elijah's Cave, Carmelites ruins, Technion and numerous other sites.

== See also ==
- Tourism in Israel
- Geography of Israel
- List of long-distance footpaths
- Wildlife in Israel
