= GR 10 =

Walking path

GR10
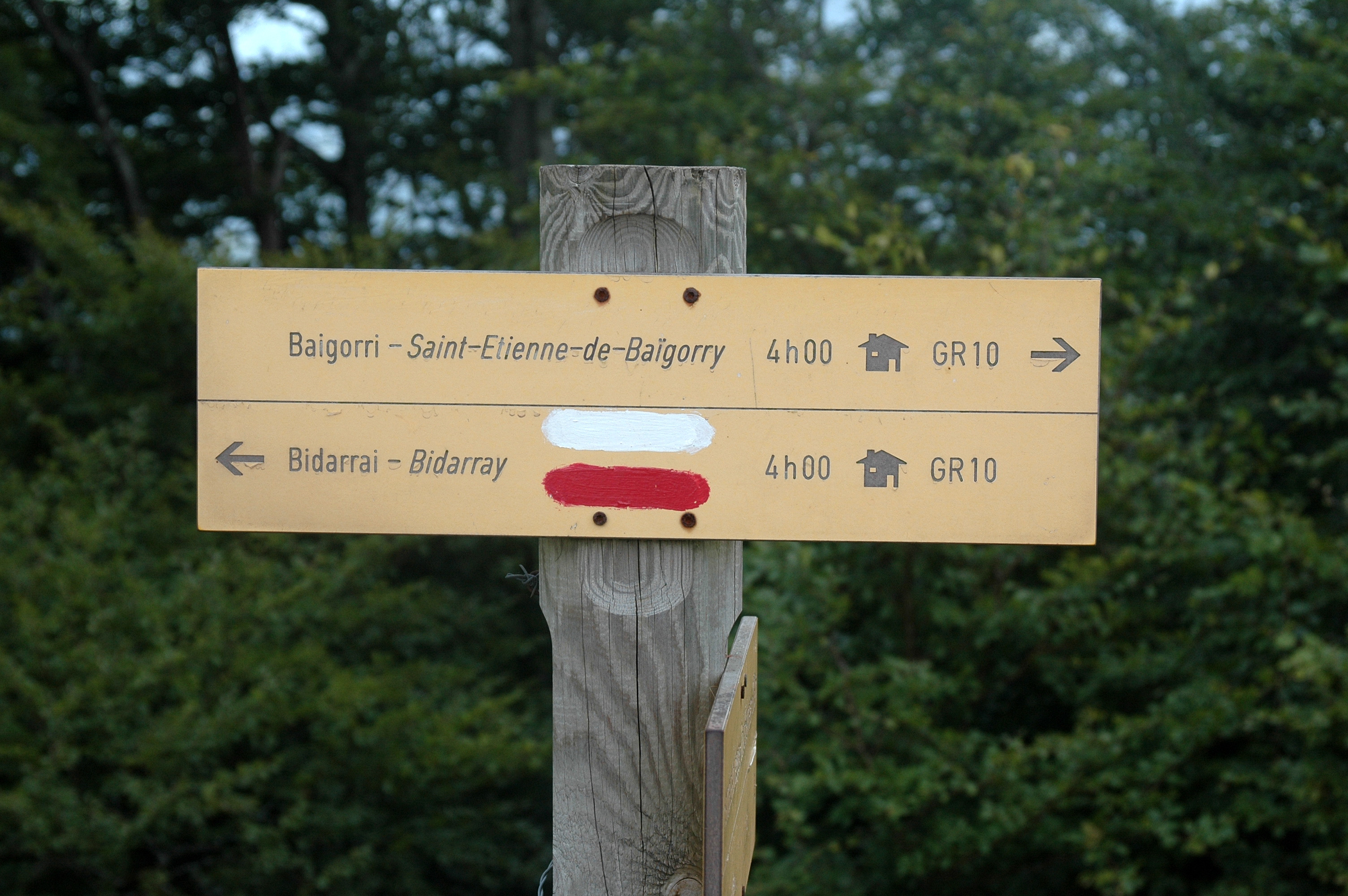
- Signpost on the GR10
- Length: 866 km (538 mi)
- Location: Pyrenees
- Designation: GR footpath
- Trailheads: Hendaye, Banyuls-sur-Mer
- Use: Hiking
- Elevation change: 48,000 m (157,000 ft)
- Season: late spring-early summer, late summer-early fall
- Hazards: Storms, Snow, Heat

GR 10 is a French GR footpath, or hiking trail, that runs the length of the Pyrenees Mountains. It roughly parallels the French–Spanish border on the French side. Those attempting the entire trail often choose to walk it from west to east, from Hendaye on the Bay of Biscay to Banyuls-sur-Mer on the Mediterranean Sea, but it can also be traversed east to west.

== Description ==
Hiking the entire route is estimated to take around 52 days for hikers who are physically fit and used to mountain hiking. Some stretches involve a lot of ascending and descending, including a few one-day sections that can climb and then descend 1,200 metres (3,900 ft), but the GR 10 is a hiking trail, and there is no actual mountain climbing involved. The trail covers a distance of 866 kilometres (538 mi), with 48,000 metres (157,000 ft) of ascent and, given the coast-to-coast nature of the route, the same descent.

Lodging along the route that cater to walkers include hotels, gîtes d'étape, and very basic mountain refuges. Camping is only necessary for two or three nights in the Ariège section. Some walkers walk one section of the trail at a time, completing the route over several visits.

The trail is well marked with red and white painted blazes. It appears on all regional maps, including on Michelin roadmaps. The route is within the area shown by the Editions Sud-Ouest Rando éditions range of maps (numbers 1–11), which are based on French Institut Géographique National 1:50,000 scale maps. Parts of the route, especially around towns and villages, change from year to year, so walkers should carry the most recent editions of the maps and guides.

A number of sections include alternative routes of a less demanding nature. Some alternatives offer more scenic choices, for example the alternative route from Cauterets to Luz-Saint-Sauveur takes in Pont d'Espagne, the Refuge Oulettes de Gaube, the Refuge Baysellance, Gavarnie, Gedre and Pragneres, and offers more spectacular mountain scenery.

Another notable section is near the village of Etsaut, where the route follows the Chemin de la Mâture, a track carved into a sheer cliff face. This path was created in the 18th century to facilitate the transport of tree trunks destined to be made into masts for French warships.

There are four very detailed guide books (in French) describing the GR 10. These are published by the Fédération Française de la Randonnée Pédestre (French Hiking Federation). These guide books can be purchased at most large sports stores in the region, and in a few of the largest sports stores in the major cities in France. English guides are also available.

The Spanish GR 11 is a similar route on the Spanish side of the border, while the only-occasionally-marked Haute Randonnée Pyrénéenne (HRP) follows a generally higher route through the Pyrenees, from mountaintop to mountaintop, frequently crossing from one side of the border to the other.

== Weather ==
The best time for hiking on the GR 10 is late spring/early summer and late summer/early fall. In the middle of the summer the heat can become a problem, though some of the ski stations on the route open their lifts for summer walkers, providing opportunities for hikers to avoid some ascents and descents. In the fall mountain storms become more frequent, making conditions dangerous. In winter most of the GR 10 is impassable due to snow.

The first high pass walking from the Atlantic Ocean is the Hourquette d'Arre (2465m). Walking from the Mediterranean Sea, the equivalent high pass is the Coma d'Anyell (2450m). Both are normally snowed up until about 14 June (in 2013 two weeks later). These are about 14 and 9 days in from the respective starting points.

== Departments crossed ==
The GR 10 passes through the French departments of:

- Pyrénées-Atlantiques
- Hautes-Pyrénées
- Haute-Garonne
- Ariège
- Pyrénées-Orientales

== Towns, villages and other stopping places ==
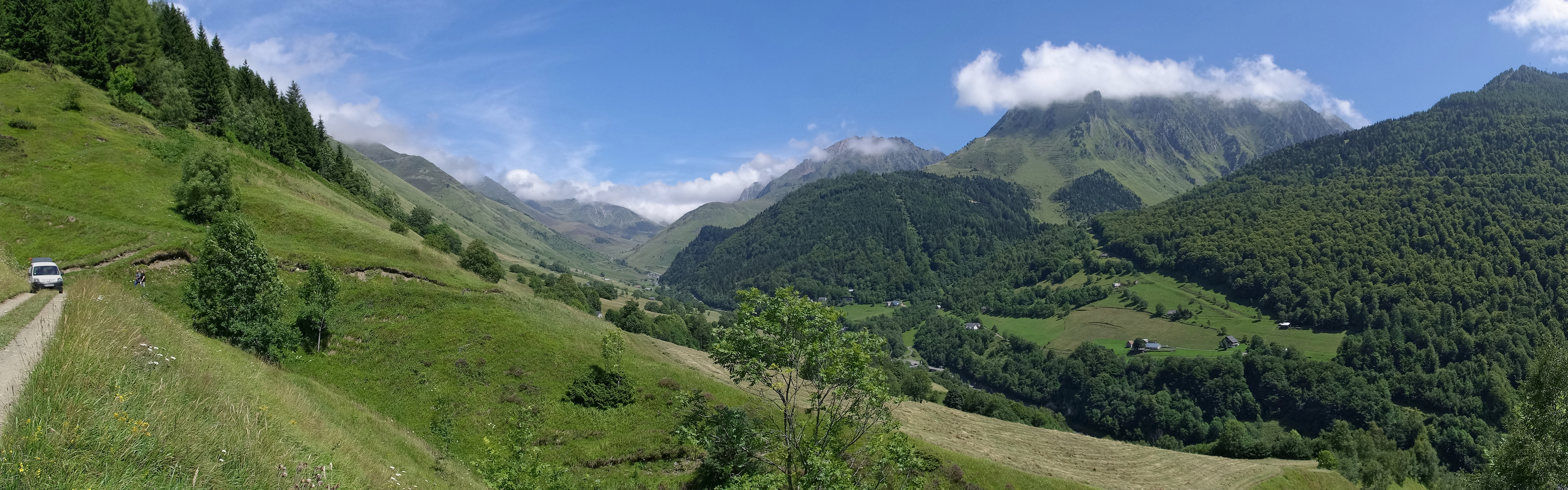
View from GR 10, near Souriche, looking towards the Col du Tourmalet, valley of Barèges, France.

Some commonly used overnight stops with camping or gîte facilities include:

- Hendaye
- Olhette
- Ainhoa
- Bidarray
- Saint-Étienne-de-Baïgorry
- Saint-Jean-Pied-de-Port
- Esterencuby
- Col Bagargiak
- Logibar (Larrau)
- Saint-Engrace
- Arette-la-Pierre-Saint-Martin
- Lescun
- Etsaut
- Gabas
- Gourette
- Arrens-Marsous
- Cauterets (and Gavarnie and Gedre via alternative route)
- Luz-Saint-Sauveur
- Barèges
- Chalet Hotel Lac de L'Oule
- Vielle Aure
- Germ
- Lac d'Oo
- Bagnères-de-Luchon
- Fos
- Refuge de l'Etang d'Araing
- Eylie d'en haut
- Cabane de Besset
- Etang d'Ayes
- Aunac
- Rouze
- St Lizier d'Ustou
- Aulus-les-Bains
- Mounicou
- Goulier
- Siguer
- Refuge de Clarans
- Refuge de Rulhe
- Mérens-les-Vals
- Refuge des Besines
- Refuge des Bouilloises
- Planes
- Refuge du Ras de la Caranca
- Mantet
- Refuge de Mariailles
- Chalet Hotel des Cortalets
- Mines de Batere
- Moulin de la Palette
- Las Illas
- Chalet de l'Albere
- Banyuls-sur-Mer
