= GR 11 (Spain) =

Footpath in the Spanish Pyrenees

Coordinates: 42°35′48″N 0°44′13″E

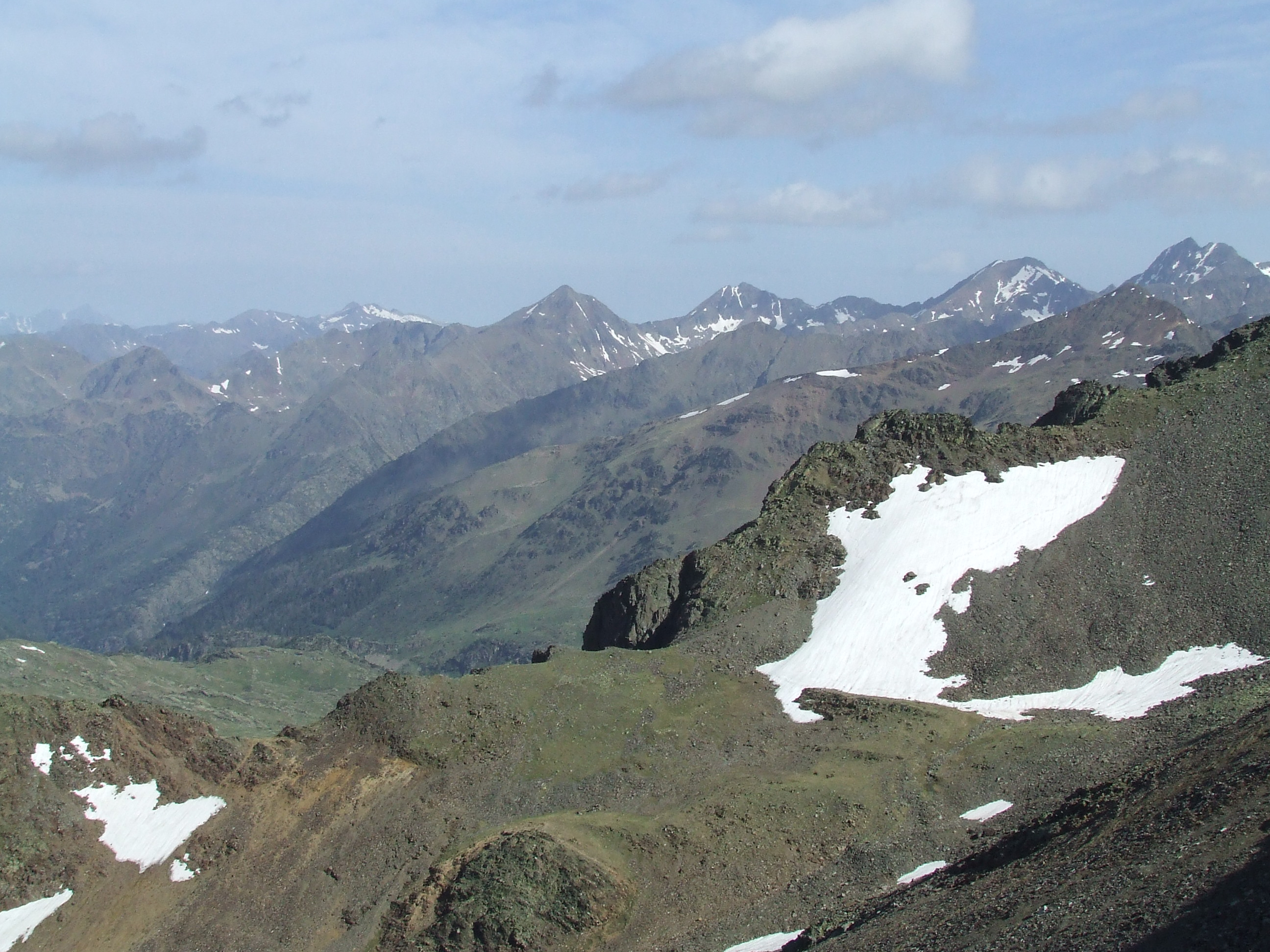
- The Portella de Baiau, between Andorra and Spain, on the GR11 footpath
- Length: 840 km (520 mi)
- Location: Pyrenees
- Designation: GR footpath
- Trailheads: Hondarribia, Cap de Creus
- Use: Hiking
- Elevation change: 39,000 m (128,000 ft)

The GR 11, also known as the ruta Transpirenaica in Spain, is part of the extensive GR footpath network of paths, tracks and trails. It runs through the Spanish Pyrenees, passing only briefly into France near Candanchu.

From West to East, the trail starts at Cape Higuer (Basque Country), crosses Navarre and Aragon and finishes at Cap de Creus (Catalonia.) Its exact distance is difficult to measure, roughly 840 km (520 mi) and a total elevation change of 39,000 m (128,000 ft). The route is separated into 45 sections. At the end of each section there is normally a stopping point (camping spot, town, hostel or refuge) but in general, supplies have to be carried for 3–4 days. Because most rivers flow perpendicular to the trail, the GR 11 passes over several valleys affording extensive views but also many ascents and descents - some days as much as 1,600 m (5,200 ft) ascent (with equivalent descent).

The trail can be walked in either direction - the deciding factors being the steepness of the terrain and the Sun. In the eastern (Catalan Pyrenees) and central part of the route (Aragonese Pyrenees), days are hotter and the profile more steep, which can prove physically challenging, especially for individuals who are less physically fit. The heat is much better tackled when the body has acclimated and physical conditioning has improved toward the end of the trip. Although walking East might provide a more comfortable start, it implies facing the Sun during the morning.

Fit walkers normally manage to complete it in about 44 days, although some people have been known to complete it in 24 days or less.

The GR 10 is a similar route but on the French side of the border while the Haute Randonnée Pyrénéenne (HRP) follows a generally higher route through the Pyrenees, frequently crossing the French-Spanish border.
