= Maximiliansweg =

Hiking path through the Bavarian Alps

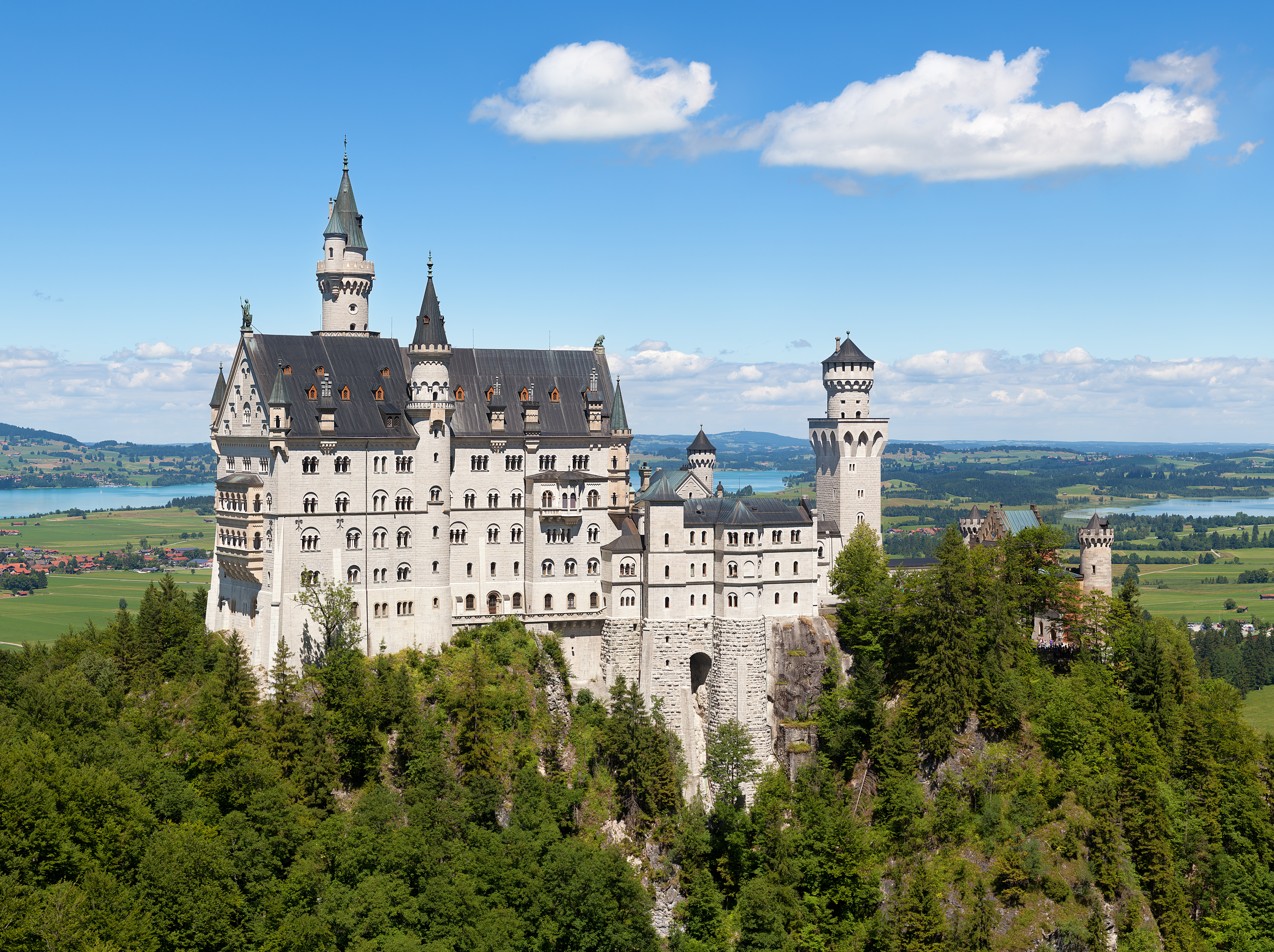
- The trail passes Neuschwanstein Castle
- Length: 350 km (220 mi)
- Location: Bavarian Alps
- Trailheads: Lindau, Berchtesgaden
- Use: Hiking
- Highest point: Tegelberg-Haus, 1,707 m (5,600 ft)
- Difficulty: medium
- Season: Summer
- Months: May–October

Maximiliansweg is a long-distance hiking path through the Bavarian Alps (with some short sections through the Austrian Alps), which connects Lindau (im Bodensee) to Berchtesgaden. The trail is about 350 km in distance and is largely congruous with long-distance path E4. Two boat crossings are suggested, from Lindau to Bregenz (over the Bodensee) and from Bad Wiessee to Tegernsee (over the Tegernsee).

Beginning in Lindau, the path travels through Bregenz, Füssen passing such notable sites as Neuschwanstein castle. It continues through the Ammergauer Alps, Mangfall Mountains, Chiemgauer Alps and ends in Berchtesgaden south of Salzburg.
