= Haute Randonnée Pyrénéenne =

Pyrenees hiking trail

- Length: 800 km (500 mi)
- Location: Pyrenees
- Use: Hiking
- Elevation change: 52,000 m (171,000 ft)

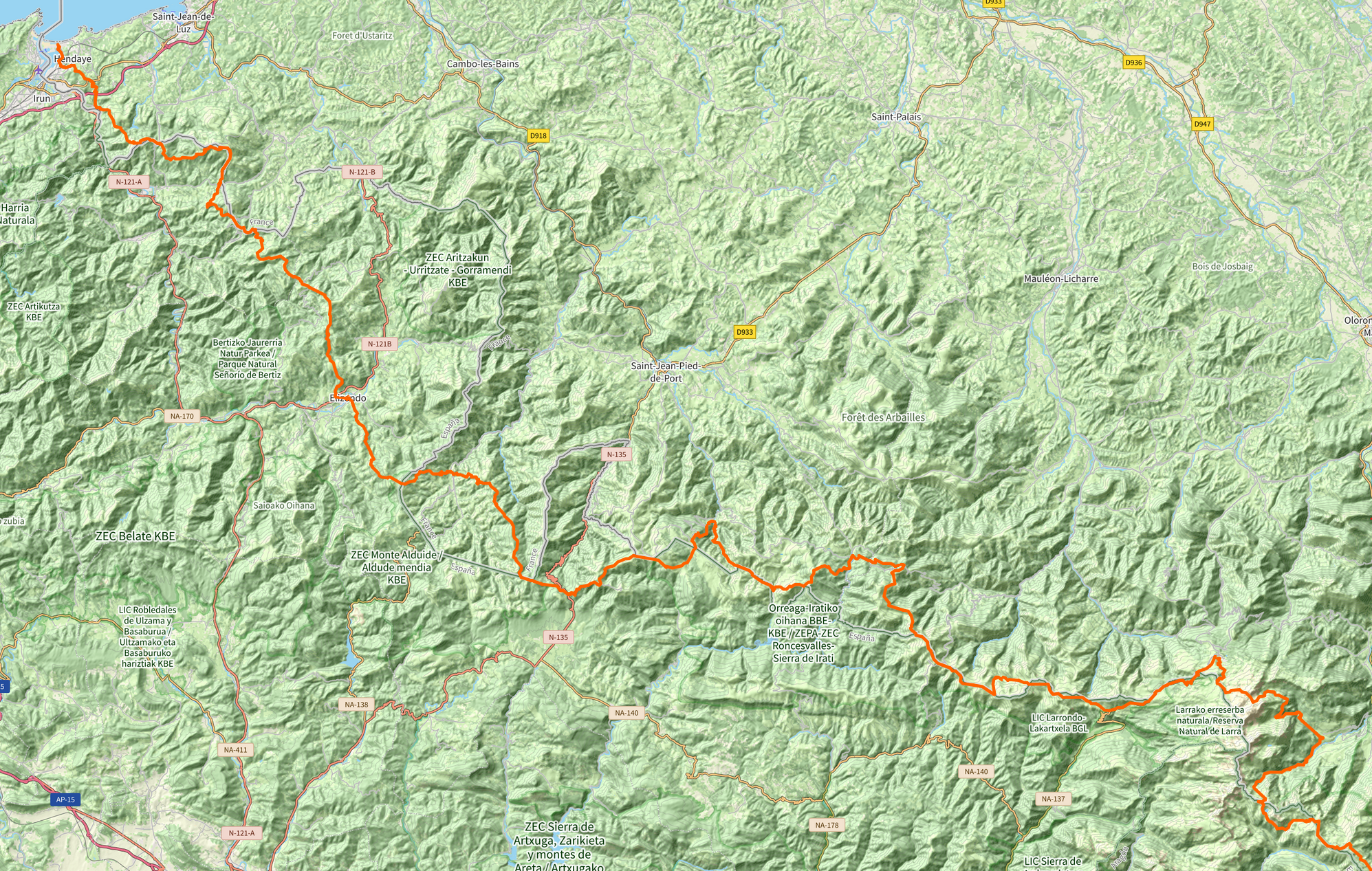
Map of the HRP from Hendaye to the Arlet refuge.

The Haute Randonnée Pyrénéenne (HRP) is a high-level long-distance trail in the Pyrenees joining the Atlantic and Mediterranean. It approximately follows the French and Spanish border and passes through Andorra.

Like the GR 10 and the GR 11, the path travels the length of the Pyrenees from coast to coast. However, where the GR 10 and GR 11 stick mainly to lower routes and mountain passes on the French and Spanish sides of the border respectively, the HRP follows a high course through the mountains and cols, frequently crossing the border to follow the highest walkable route. It is mostly an unmarked trail although the typical paths are sometimes marked by cairns of stones or small red and white painted marks. It is usually done from west to east, which takes about 45 days to complete for an experienced hiker. It crosses the Parc National des Pyrenées and the Parc nacional d'Aigüestortes i Sant Maurici. Many variations on the original route proposed by Georges Veron are possible and described in the guidebook, as well as some easy summits (Aneto, Vignemale). There are some popular and crowded places on the trail, but also very remote areas, where it can take a day before you see someone. In these areas it can be several days between huts, so it is necessary to carry a tent. The HRP crosses the Way of St. James (El Camino de Santiago) on the Col d'Ibañeta, near Roncevaux.

Like the GR 10, the HRP begins at Hendaye on the Atlantic coast and finishes at Banyuls-sur-Mer on the Mediterranean.

The HRP was devised by Georges Véron in 1968. Joosten's published version of the route deviates substantially from Véron's and both offer variants to their main itineraries. A digital (gpx) version of Joosten's guide, improved and expanded, can be obtained from www.hrpguide.org with all proceeds going to a Himalayan earthquake relief fund. In 2020, Louis-Philippe Loncke used the HRP to cross the Pyrenees without resupply or external assistance.
