= Seyahatnâme =

Travelogue by Evliya Çelebi

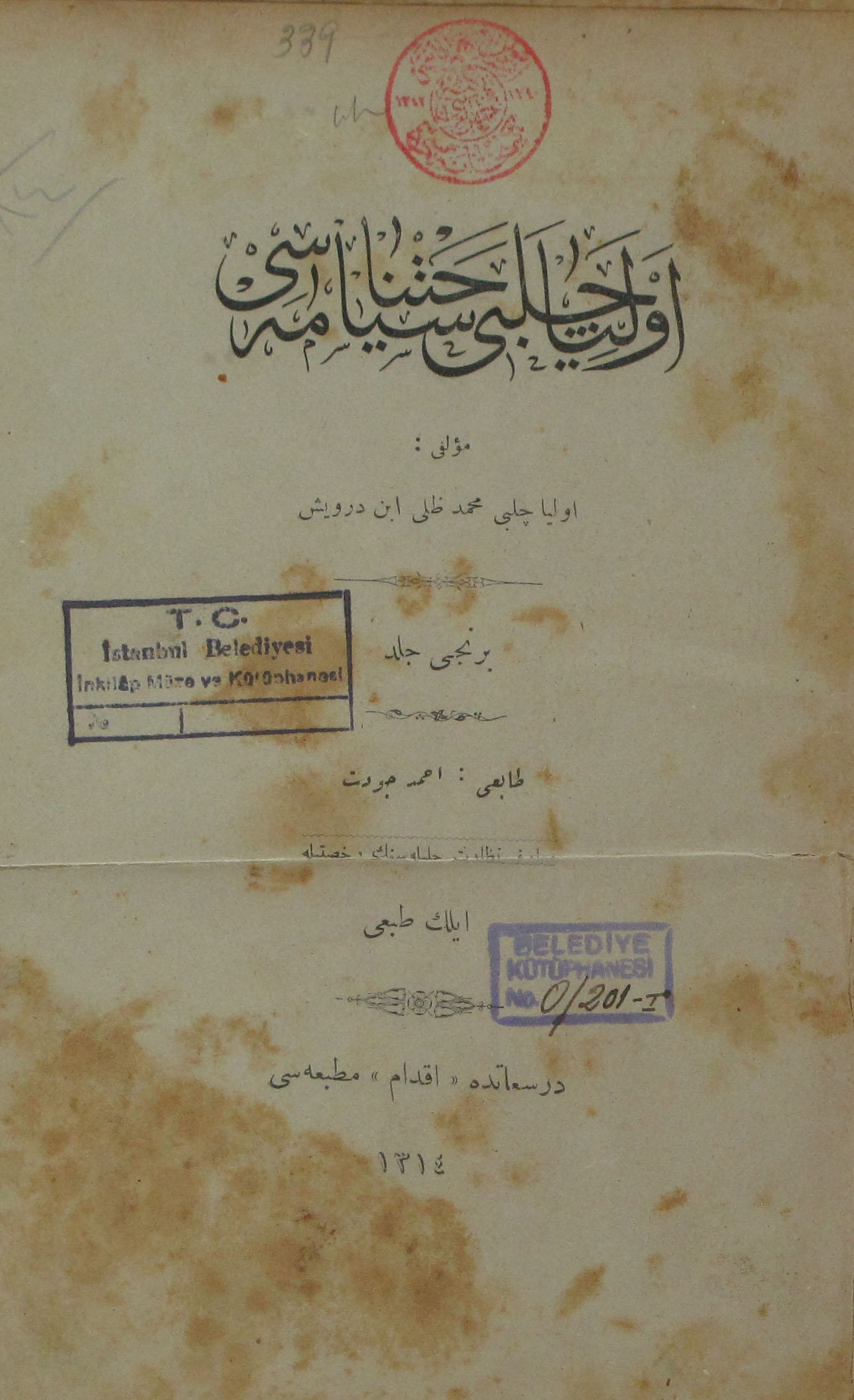
Title page of an 1895 edition of Evliya Çelebi's Seyahatname

The Seyahatnâme (Ottoman Turkish: سياحتنامه, romanized: Seyâḥatnâme, lit. 'travel-book') is a travelogue written by the Ottoman Turkish traveller Evliya Çelebi (1611–1682). It describes his journeys across much of the Ottoman Empire and neighboring regions.

It is a major work of Ottoman travel literature and an important example of travel writing from the Muslim world. The title later became the standard Turkish term for a travelogue, while other literary traditions of the Muslim world use different terms for this genre.

== Author ==
The author's personal name is Derviş Mehmed Zilli, and “Evliya” is his pen name, which he adopted in honor of his teacher, Evliya Mehmed Efendi. Evliya Çelebi's father was the chief jeweller to the courts, and thanks to the talent of his father Evliya was allowed to enjoy the favor of the court. Because of his gift in reciting the Quran, Evliya was presented to Sultan Murad IV and admitted to the palace, where he received extensive training in calligraphy, music, Arabic grammar, and tajwid. Shortly before Murad IV's expedition to Baghdad in 1638, Evliya was appointed a sipahi of the Porte. Despite his diverse talents and the opportunity to climb socially, Evliya had a keen interest in geography and invested his wealth into his life goal of traveling. He set out on a journey to assemble a complete description of the Ottoman Empire and its neighbors and to provide a complete record of his travels as a first-person narrative.

== Volumes and content ==
In his ten-volume Seyâhatnâme, Evliya describes:

- Volume I: the capital city of Istanbul (his birthplace) and its surroundings
- Volume II: Bursa, İzmir, Batumi, Trabzon, Abkhazia, Crete, Erzurum, Azerbaijan, Georgia
- Volume III: Damascus, Syria, Palestine, Urmia, Sivas, Kurdistan, Armenia, Rumelia (Bulgaria and Dobruja)
- Volume IV: Van, Tabriz, Baghdad, Basra
- Volume V: Van, Basra, Hungary, Russia, Anatolia, Bursa, the Dardanelles, Adrianople, Moldavia, Transylvania, Bosnia, Dalmatia, Sofia
- Volume VI: Transylvania, Albania, Hungary, Nové Zámky, Belgrade, Herzegovina, Ragusa (Dubrovnik), Montenegro, Kanizsa, Croatia
- Volume VII: Hungary, Buda, Erlau, Temesvár, Transylvania, Wallachia, Moldavia, the Crimea, Kazak, South Russia, the Caucasus, Dagestan, Azak
- Volume VIII: Azak, Kafa, Bahçesaray (Crimea), Istanbul, Crete, Macedonia, Greece, Athens, the Dodecanese, Peloponnesus, Albania, Valona, Ochrida, Adrianople, Istanbul
- Volume IX: (Pilgrimage to Mecca) south-west Anatolia, Smyrna, Ephesus, Rhodes, south Anatolia, Syria, Aleppo, Damascus, Medina, Mecca, Suez
- Volume X: Egypt (with historical excursus), Cairo, Upper Egypt, Sudan, Abyssinia.

== Features and limitations ==
Evliya prefers legend to bare historical fact, and at times exaggerates or creates anecdotes designed for comic effect. His Seyâhatnâme thus appears as a work of 17th-century light literature, which was intelligible to a wide circle thanks to the mixed use of the colloquial Turkish of the 17th century with occasional borrowings of phrases and expressions from the ornate style. Such attempt to appeal to a wide audience may explain the author's lack of concern for historical truth. He even recorded certain occurrences as though he had seen or experienced them himself even though a close examination reveals that he knows of them only from hearsay or literary sources, which he does not cite.

In spite of these reservations, Evliya's Seyâhatnâme offers a wealth of information on cultural history, folklore, and geography. The significance of the work lies in the fact that it reflects the mental approach of the 17th century Ottoman Turkish intellectuals in their attitudes to the non-Muslim Occident, and sheds light on the administration and internal organization of the Ottoman Empire of that time.

== Translations ==
Aside from several translations into modern Turkish, substantial portions of Evliya's Seyâhatnâme have been translated into Arabic, Armenian, Bosnian, Greek, Hungarian, Romanian, Russian, and Serbian. The most recent English translation is Robert Dankoff and Sooyong Kim's 2010 translation, An Ottoman Traveller: Selections from the Book of Travels of Evliya Çelebi, which includes sections from all volumes.

A related genre, specific to the journeys and experiences of Ottoman ambassadors, is the sefâretnâme (سفارت نامه), whose examples were edited by their authors with a view to their presentation to the Sultan and the high administration, thus also bearing a semi-official character, although they remained of interest for the general reader as well.

== See also ==
- Piri Reis (and his Kitab-ı Bahriye)
- Turkish literature
- Evliya Çelebi Way

== Sources ==
- Fotić, Aleksandar (2021). "Receptions of Evliya Çelebi's Seyahatname in Serbian Historiography and Challenges of the Original Manuscript". Evliya Çelebi in the Borderlands: New Insights and Novel Approaches to the Seyahatname. Zagreb: Srednja Europa. pp. 149–163.
