= Tour du Lot =

Tour du Lot: The department of Lot sits at the northern end of the Midi-Pyrénées region of France. The Tour du Lot is a circuit of over 500 km around the department's periphery using a mixture of GR routes, footpaths, bridleways, and quiet country roads, which can be completed on foot, by off-road bike or on horseback. The official route was devised by the Comité Départmental de la Randonée Pédestre (CODERANDO 46), the Association Départmentale de Tourisme Equestre (ATE), and the Comité Départmental de Cyclotourisme VTT (CODEP 46 FFCT), supported financially and technically by the Counseil Général du Lot, the Départmentale de la Jeunesse et des Sports, and the Comité Départmental du Tourisme.

For walkers embarking on the Tour du Lot the circuit is broken down into 14 stages, starting and ending at Laval de Cère in the north east of the department. With two exceptions, each stage is walked over two days, covering on average 19 km a day, with the possibility of an overnight stop at a chambre d'hote, hotel or campsite, depending on the walker's preference or availability of accommodation. The other two stages are one-day walks. The route is poorly signed but the official Tour du Lot symbol is shown below.

The 14 stages are as follows:

Stage	From	To	Distance km
Stage 01	Laval de Cère	Sousceyrac	44.1
Stage 02	Sousceyrac	Latronquière	45.1
Stage 03	Latronquière	Bagnac sur Célé	36.0
Stage 04	Bagnac sur Célé	Faycelles	36.2
Stage 05	Faycelles	Limogne en Quercy	39.9
Stage 06	Limogne en Quercy	St Paul de Loubressac	44.3
Stage 07	St Paul de Loubressac	Montcuq	35.0
Stage 08	Montcuq	Puy l’Evêque	24.7
Stage 09	Puy l’Evêque	Frayssinet le Gélat	39.7
Stage 10	Frayssinet le Gélat	Gourdon	36.9
Stage 11	Gourdon	Rocamadour	30.0
Stage 12	Rocamadour	Martel	34.9
Stage 13	Martel	Tauriac	33.0
Stage 14	Tauriac	Laval de Cère	27.4
TOTAL			507.2
