= TransPanama Trail =

Hiking trail in Panama

TransPanama Trail or TransPanama Hike is a walking trail 1,100 kilometers (700 mi) in length located in Panama. This hiking trail was opened during 2009 and involves walking, hiking, canoeing and passes through neighboring provinces like the Darién Gap. Rick Morales was the first person to complete TransPanama Trail on 23 September 2011.

== See also ==
- American Discovery Trail
