= Evliya Çelebi Way =

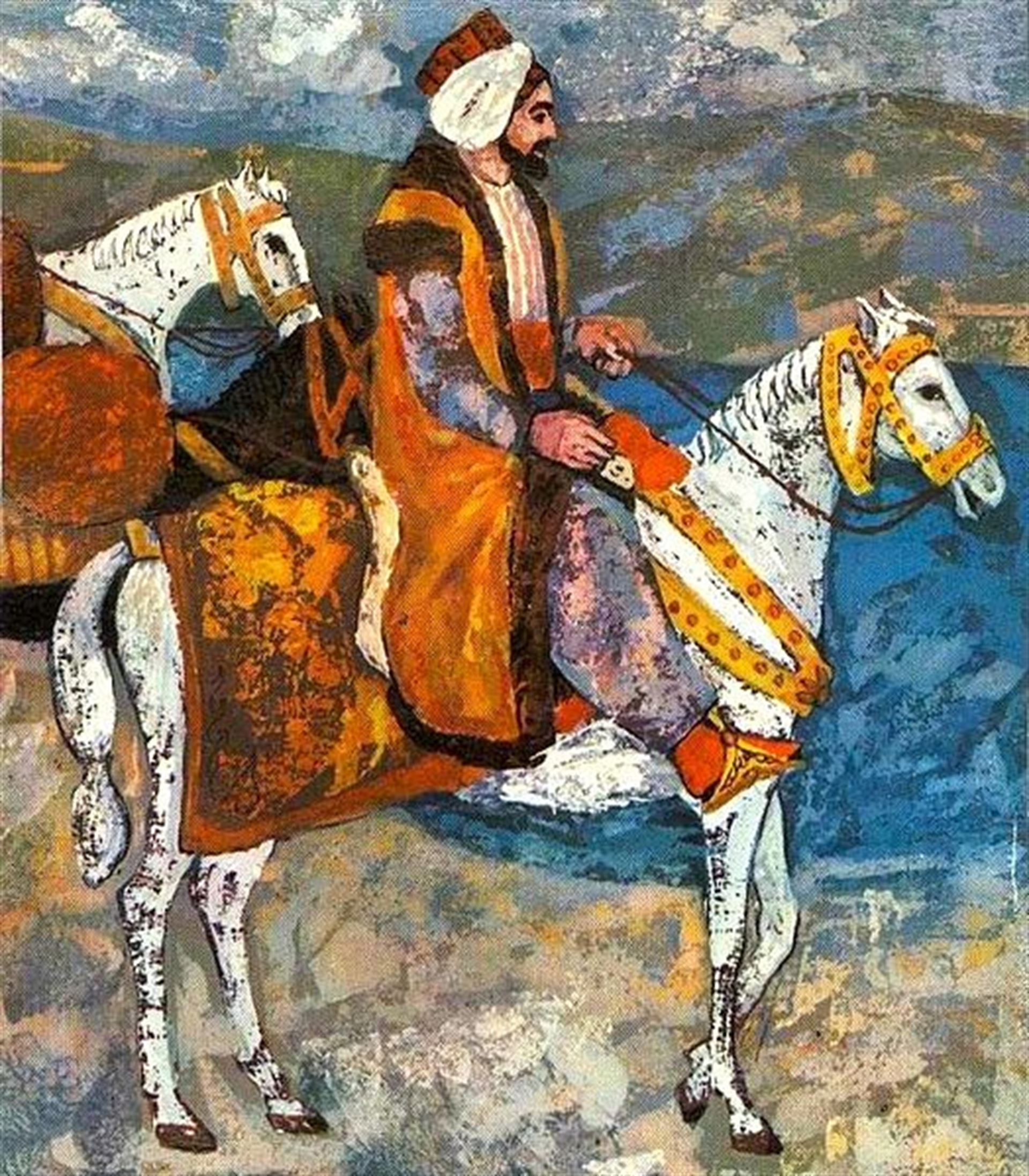
Evliya Çelebi

The Evliya Çelebi Way is a cultural trekking route celebrating the early stages of the journey made in 1671 to Mecca by the eponymous Ottoman Turkish gentleman-adventurer, Evliya Çelebi. Evliya travelled the Ottoman Empire and beyond for some 40 years, leaving a 10 volume account of his journeys.

== Route ==
The Evliya Çelebi Way is a c.600 km-long trail for horse-riders, hikers and bikers. It begins at Hersek (a village in Altınova district), on the south coast of the Izmit Gulf, and traces Evliya's pilgrimage journey via Iznik, Yenişehir, Inegöl, Kütahya (his ancestral home), Afyonkarahisar, Uşak, Eski Gediz, and Simav. (Heavy urbanisation prevents the Way entering either Istanbul, from where he set out in 1671, or Bursa).

The Evliya Çelebi Way was inaugurated in autumn 2009 by a group of Turkish and British riders and academics. See Donna Landry and Gerald MacLean, 'Expedition and Reenactment: Recovering the Ottoman Past through Creating the Evliya Celebi Way,' in Vanessa Agnew, Sabine Stach, and Juliane Tomann, eds., Reenactment Case Studies: Global Perspectives on Experiental History (London and New York: Routledge, 2023): 195-216. A guidebook to the route, both English and Turkish, includes practical information for the modern traveller, day-by-day route descriptions, maps, photos, historical and architectural background, notes on the environment, and summaries of Evliya's description of places he saw when he travelled in the region, paired with what the visitor may see today.

== Bibliography ==
- Yücel Dağlı; Seyit Ali Kahraman; Robert Dankoff (2004). Evliya Çelebi Seyahatnamesi. vol.9 (modern Turkish transcription) Istanbul: YapıKredi Yayınları.
- Dankoff, Robert (2004). An Ottoman Mentality. The World of Evliya Çelebi. Leiden: Brill.
- Robert Dankoff; Sooyong Kim (2010). An Ottoman Traveller: Selections from the Book of Travels of Evliya Celebi. London: Eland Books.
- Caroline Finkel (2011). Evliya Çelebi: Traveller's Tales. History Today, vol.61 issue 11.

== See also ==
- Seyahatname
- Book of Travels
- Ottoman Empire
- Cornucopia Magazine
- Turkish literature
- ibn Battuta
