= E4 European long distance path =

Walking path

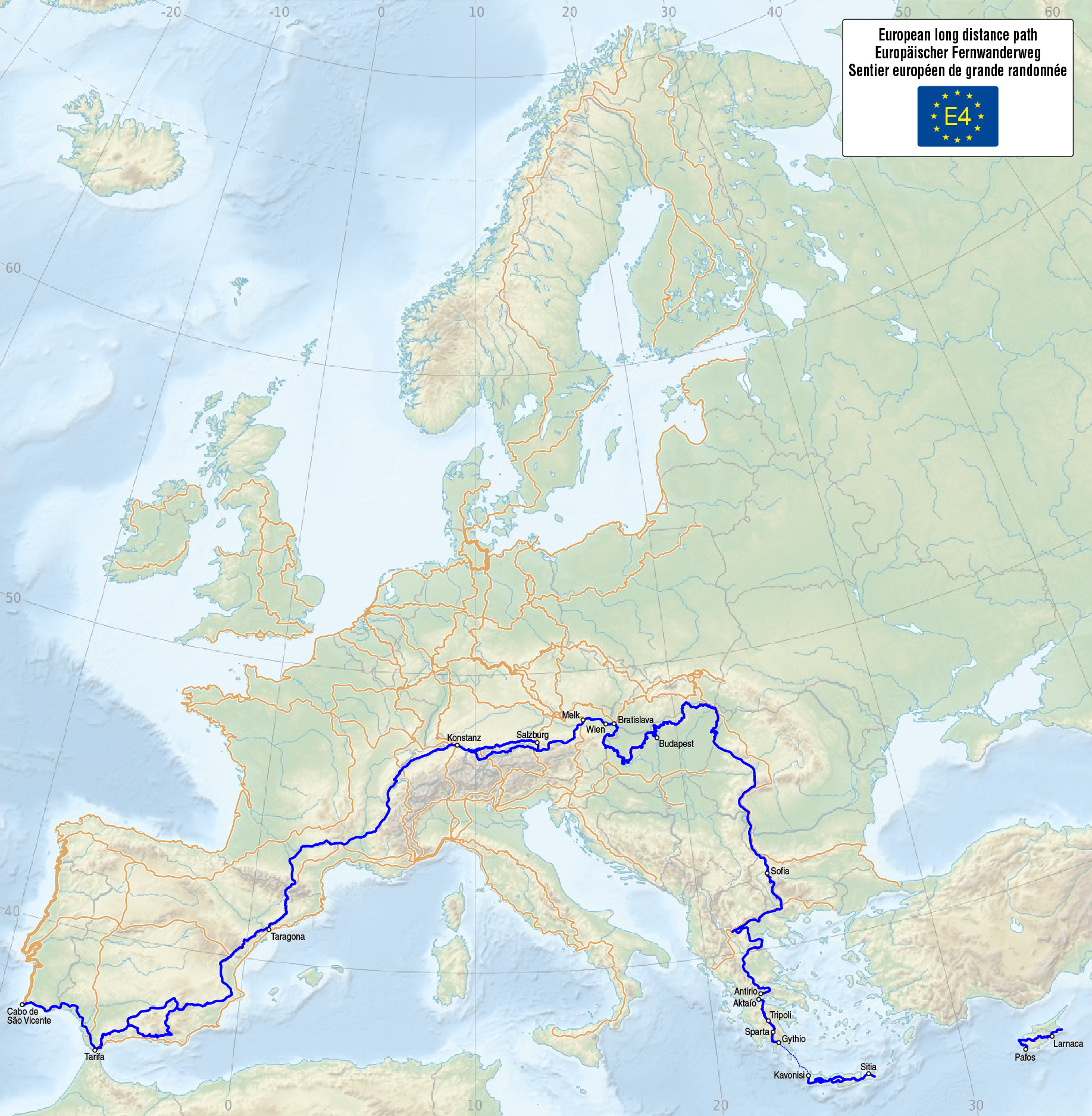
The European walking route E4

The E4 European long distance path or E4 path is one of the European long-distance paths. Starting in Cabo de San Vicente in Portugal, located at the southernmost end of the Iberian Peninsula, across the Strait of Gibraltar facing Morocco, it continues through Spain, France, Switzerland, Germany, Austria, Hungary, Romania, Bulgaria and Greece to end in Cyprus. It also visits the Greek island of Crete.

It is more than 10,000 kilometres (6,200 mi) long, but the route through Romania and part of Bulgaria is not yet completely defined. An alternative route through Serbia, instead of Romania, has been defined.

== Spain (2267 km) ==
- Andalucia, Murcia and Valencia: From Tarifa, the southernmost point of continental Europe, the E4 follows the GR 7 through Ronda, Alhama de Granada, Moratalla, Alcoi, Elda, Morella.
- Catalonia: GR 7 to Bellprat, then GR 172 to Montserrat and finally GR 4 into the Pyrenees. The E4 crosses the border to France east of Andorra. Last city in Spain is Puigcerda.

== France (1374 km) ==
- Occitania: First city in France is Bourg-Madame. The E4 follows the GR 36 to the Montagne Noire via Carcassonne. After the Pic de Nore along the GR 7 through the Cévennes over Mont Aigoual and along the GR 68 to Villefort. From there along GR 44 and GR 4 to Pont-Saint-Esprit.
- Provence-Alpes-Côte d’Azur: After crossing the Rhône climb Mont Ventoux and change to GR 9.
- Auvergne-Rhône-Alpes: GR 9 through Vercors and Chartreuse Mountains. Largest city on the way is Grenoble. From the Plateau de Retord the E4 follows the Grand Tour de la Valserine (red-yellow markings) to Lelex. From there again GR 9 and finally GR 5 to the Swiss border at La Cure.

== Switzerland ==
Follows the Jura ridgeway through the north of the country ending at village Dielsdorf (300 km).

From Dielsdorf, the E4 continues along the southern shores of Lake Constance via the following settlements to the village of Rheineck on the German border (150 km):

Niederglatt – Bülach – Freienstein-Teufen – Irchel – Buch am Irchel – Dorf – Andelfingen – Truttikon – Oberstammheim – Stein am Rhein – Mammern – Steckborn – Berlingen – Mannebach – Ermatingen – Gottlieben – Kreuzlingen – Münsterlingen – Güttingen – Uttwil – Romanshorn – Egnach – Arbon – Steinach – Tübach – Goldach – Rorschacherberg – Buchberg – Rheineck

== Germany/Austria ==
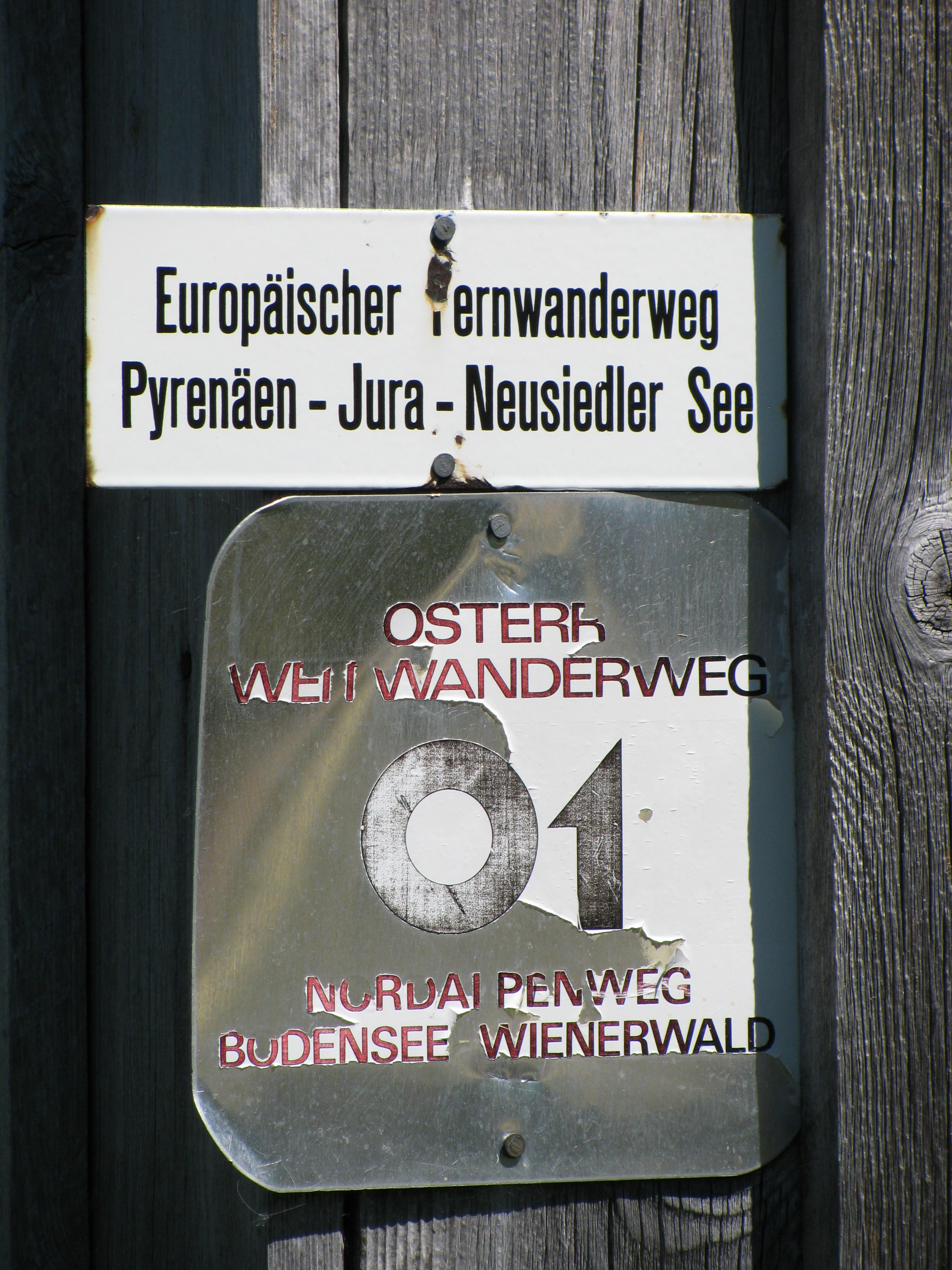
Trail labels of the 'E4' and the 'Österreichischer Weitwanderweg 01' near Fontanella, Austria

Alternative 1:
On the route of Nordalpine Weitwanderweg 01 (Nordalpine route 01) are exposed stretches - for experienced mountain walkers only

1. Western section of the route – 495 km
through Bregenzer Wald, Lechquellengebirge, Lechtaler Alps, Wetterstein-gebirge, Karwendelgebirge and Rofangebirge:

Bregenz (440 m) – Lustenauer Hut (1250 m) – 22 km, moderately difficult
Lustenauer Hut (1250 m) – Damüls (1428 m) – 33 km, difficult
Damüls (1428 m) – Biberacher Hut (1846 m) – 18 km, very difficult
Biberacher Hut (1846 m) – Göppinger Hut (2245 m) – 16 km, difficult
Göppinger Hut (2245 m) – Ravensburger Hut (2234 m) – 31 km, very difficult
Ravensburger Hut (2234 m) – Stuttgarter Hut (2303 m) – 20 km, difficult
Stuttgarter Hut (2303 m) – Ansbacher Hut (2376 m) – 28 km, very difficult
Ansbacher Hut (2376 m) – Memminger Hut (2242 m), 25 km, very difficult
Memminger Hut (2242 m) – Steinsee Hut (2040 m) – 20 km, very difficult
Steinsee Hut (2040 m) – Anhalter Hut (2040 m) – 25 km, difficult
Anhalter Hut (2040 m) – Fernpass (1209 m) – 35 km, difficult
Fernpass (1209 m) – Ehrwald (994 m) – 20 km, moderately difficult
Ehrwald (994 m) – Meiler Hut (2366 m) – 39 km, difficult
Meiler Hut (2366 m) – Scharnitz (964 m) – 30 km, moderately difficult
Scharnitz (964 m) – Falken Hut (1846 m) – 30 km, moderately difficult
Falken Hut (1846 m) – Maurach am Achensee (958 m) – 35 km, moderately difficult
Maurach am Achsensee (958 m) – Steinberg am Rofan (1010 m) – 25 km, difficult
Steinberg am Rofan (1010 m) – Kufstein (504 m) – 43 km, easy

2. Middle section of the route – 441 km
through Kaisergebirge, Chiemgau Alps, Loferer Steingebirge, Hochkönig and Steinernes Meer, Tennengebirge, Dachstein Mountains and Totes Gebirge:

Kufstein (504 m) – Stripsenjoch Haus (1580 m) – 19 km, moderately difficult
Stripsenjoch Haus (1580 m) – Straubinger Haus (1598 m) – 35 km, moderately difficult
Straubinger Haus (1598 m) – Schmidt-Zabierow Hut (1966 m) – 39 km, difficult
Schmidt-Zabierow Hut (1966 m) – Lofer (626 m) – 16 km, moderately difficult
Lofer (626 m) – Ingolstatter Haus (2199 m) – 31 km, moderately difficult
Ingolstatter Haus (2199 m) – Riemann Haus (2177 m) – 8 km, moderately difficult
Riemann Haus (2177 m) – Franz-Eduard-Matras Haus (2941 m) – 25 km, very difficult, on glacier
Franz-Eduard-Matras Haus (2941 m) – Werfen (548 m) – 27 km, difficult, on glacier
Werfen (548 m) – Lungötz (828 m) – 33 km, moderately difficult
Lungötz (828 m) – Adamek Hut (2196 m) – 29 km, very difficult
Adamek Hut (2196 m) – Simony Hut (2206 m) – 12 km, very difficult, on glacier
Simony Hut (2206 m) – Bad Goisern (500 m) – 32 km, moderately difficult
Bad Goisern (500 m) – Loser Hut (1497 m) – 34 km, moderately difficult
Loser Hut (1497 m) – Pühringer Hut (1638 m) – 25 km, moderately difficult
Pühringer Hut (1638 m) – Priel Refuge Hut (1422 m) – 20 km, difficult
Priel Refuge Hut (1422 m) – Vorderstoder (660 m) – 18 km, moderately difficult
Vorderstoder (660 m) – Spital am Pyhrn (647 m) – 38 km, moderately difficult

3. Eastern section of the route – 478 km
Through Rax, Semmeringgebiet, Bucklige Welt and Rosaliengebirge

Spital am Pyhrn (647 m) – Admont (641 m) – 24 km, moderately difficult
Admont (641 m) – Hess Hut (1699 m) – 35 km, moderately difficult
Hess Hut (1699 m) – Radmer an der Stube (702 m) – 20 km, difficult
Radmer an der Stube (702 m) – Eisenerz (769 m) – 20 km, moderately difficult
Eisenerz (769 m) – Sonnschien Hut (1525 m) – 25 km, moderately difficult
Sonnschien Hut (1525 m) – Voisthaler Hut (1660 m) – 17 km, moderately difficult
Voisthaler Hut (1660 m) – Turnaueralm (1570 m) – 25 km, moderately difficult
Turnaueralm (1570 m) – Neuberg, Krampen im Mürztal (756 m) – 31 km, moderately difficult
Neuberg, Krampen im Mürztal (756 m) – Schneealpen Haus (1788 m) – 31 km, moderately difficult
Schneealpen Haus (1788 m) – Karl-Ludwig Haus (1803 m) – 21 km, difficult
Karl-Ludwig Haus (1803 m) – Waxriegel Haus (1361 m) – 12 km, moderately difficult
Waxriegel Haus (1361 m) – Maria Schutz (760 m) – 30 km, moderately difficult
Maria Schutz (760 m) – Hochwolkersdorf (625 m) – 48 km, easy
Hochwolkersdorf (625 m) – Mattersburg (256 m) – 17 km, easy

After town Mattersburg the route of the E4 leaves the Nordalpine Weitwanderweg 01, and goes on other paths further.

Mattersburg (256 m) – Rust (123 m) – 32 km, easy
Rust (123 m) – Drassburg (234 m) – 20 km, easy
Drassburg (234 m) – Kobersdorf (320 m) – 28 km, easy
Kobersdorf (320 m) – Hochstrass (421 m) – 25 km, easy
Hochstrass (421 m) – Köszeg (271 m, border crossing point in Hungary) – 17 km, easy

Remark:
Generally there are detours on the route of E4 to avoid the very difficult sections.
You can find map sketches and description about the whole route in the book „Vom Neusiedler See zum Bodensee – Nordalpiner Weitwanderweg 01” in German.

Continue 2:

Subalpine route
to: Salzburg
Through Allgäu and Upper Bavaria via Neuschwanstein, Unterammergau, Bavarian Lakes (04) 550 km
to: Wienerwald
via Salzkammergut (04)
550 km
to: Hainburg an der Donau
E Austrian border path (07)
150 km

== Hungary ==
The path of European walking route E4 in Hungary

On the route of the Országos Kéktúra (National Blue Trail) – 1118 km
Through the Little Hungarian Plain and along the Transdanubian Mountains and the North Hungarian Mountains.

Town Kőszeg (border crossing point) – peak of Irottkő – town Sárvár through the Mountains of Kőszeg and the Little Hungarian Plain – 70 km
Town Sárvár – town Sümeg through the Little Hungarian Plain – 70 km
Town Sümeg – town Keszthely and Lake Balaton through the Highland of Balaton – 47 km
Town Keszthely – town Tapolca – village Nagyvázsony through the Basin of Tapolca and the Highland of Balaton. On the basin the path climbs almost every spent volcano: Badacsony, Gulács, Csobánc and Szent György Mountain – 83 km
Village Nagyvázsony – village Városlőd – town Zirc – village Bodajk through the Bakony Mountains – 118 km
Village Bodajk – village Szárliget through the Vértes Mountains – 48 km
Village Szárliget – town Dorog through the Hilly Country of Gerecse – 67 km
Town Dorog – Budapest through the Pilis Mountains and Mountains of Buda – 40 km
Budapest – peak of Dobogókö (700 m) – village Visegrád, Danube Bend through the Buda and Pilis Mountains – 61 km
Village Visegrád – village Nagymaros – with ferry across the Danube
Village Nagymaros – peak of Hegyes-kö (centre mountain of Danube Bend) – village Kóspallag – peak of Csóványos (938 m) – village Nógrád through the Börzsöny Mountains – 38 km
Village Nógrád – village Becske – village Hollókő, it is a World Heritage Site – village Mátraverebély through the Hilly Country of Cserhát – 119 km
Village Mátraverebély – peak of Galyatetö – peak of Kékestető, 1014 m, the highest point of Hungary – village Sirok – village Szarvaskő through the Mátra Mountains – 65 km
Village Szarvaskő – village Bélapátfalva – village Bánkút – village Putnok – through the Bükk Mountains – 55 km
Village Putnok – village Aggtelek, its stalactite cave is a World Heritage Site – village Bódvaszilas through the Hilly Country of Aggtelek – 62 km
Village Bódvaszilas – village Boldogkőváralja through the Hilly Country of Cserehát – 65 km
Village Boldogkőváralja – town Sátoraljaújhely through the Zemplén Mountains – 55 km

In Sátoraljaújhely the route of the E4 leaves the path of the National Blue Trail and goes further on the route of Blue Tour of the Plain

On the route of Alföldi Kéktúra (Blue Tour of the Plain) – 262 km
Through the Great Hungarian Plain

Town Sátoraljaujhely – town Kisvárda – 63 km
Town Kisvárda – town Nyirbátor – 46 km
Town Nyirbátor – town Bánk – 75 km
Town Bánk – village Nagykereki – 78 km

After village Nagykereki the E4 leaves the path of Alföldi Kéktúra and goes to village Ártánd (border crossing point) – appr. 6 km

Remark:
You can find detailed hiker maps and travelogues about the section of the Országos Kéktúra in Hungarian in the following books:
Az Országos Kéktúra Írottkötöl Budapest, Hüvösvölgyig
Az Országos Kéktúra Budapest, Hüvösvölgytöl Hollóházáig

There are websites of Hungarian hikers about the completion of the Országos Kéktúra:

- Hörpölin&son’s website about the Blue Tour – in English with travelogues and more than 1000 photos

== Romania ==
The route of the E4 through Romania is not yet clearly defined. No organization is responsible for the trail's upkeep in Romania.

== Serbia ==
As an alternative to Romania a route for the E4 through Serbia has been described by the Serbian Mountain Association (Planinarski Savez Srbije). This starts from border post from Hungary at the Serbian village of Dala. To reach this point in Hungary the route continues along the Alföldi Kéktúra from Nagykereki to Szeged. In Serbia the E4 crosses Vojvodina to reach Belgrade then follows the River Danube and various mountain ranges to the Bulgarian border at Dimitrovgrad, Serbia. The E4 has not been defined between the Serbian border and Sofia but the Sultans Trail route can be followed. The trail in Serbia is not waymarked and the published booklet does not describe the route in detail.

== Bulgaria ==
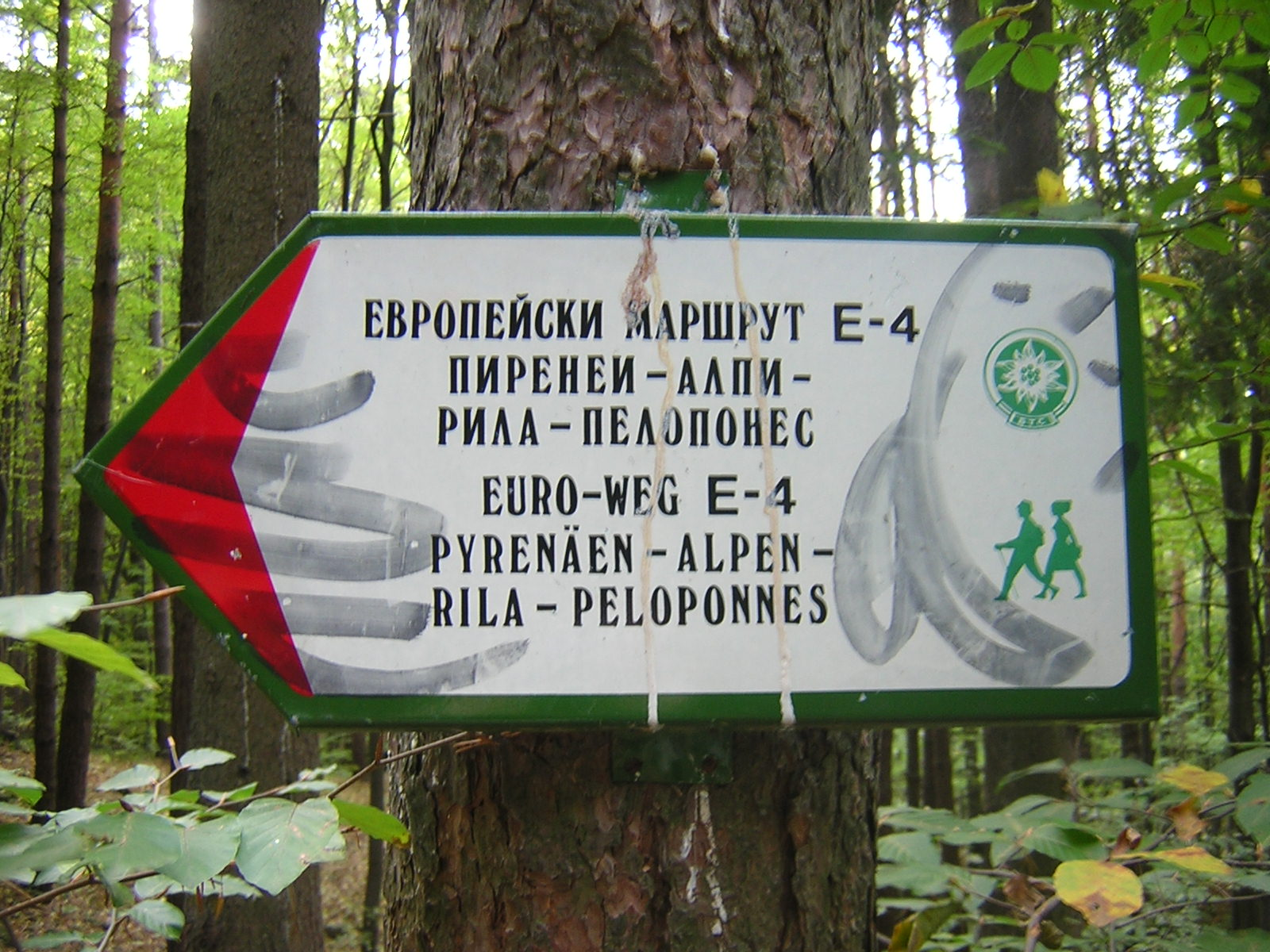

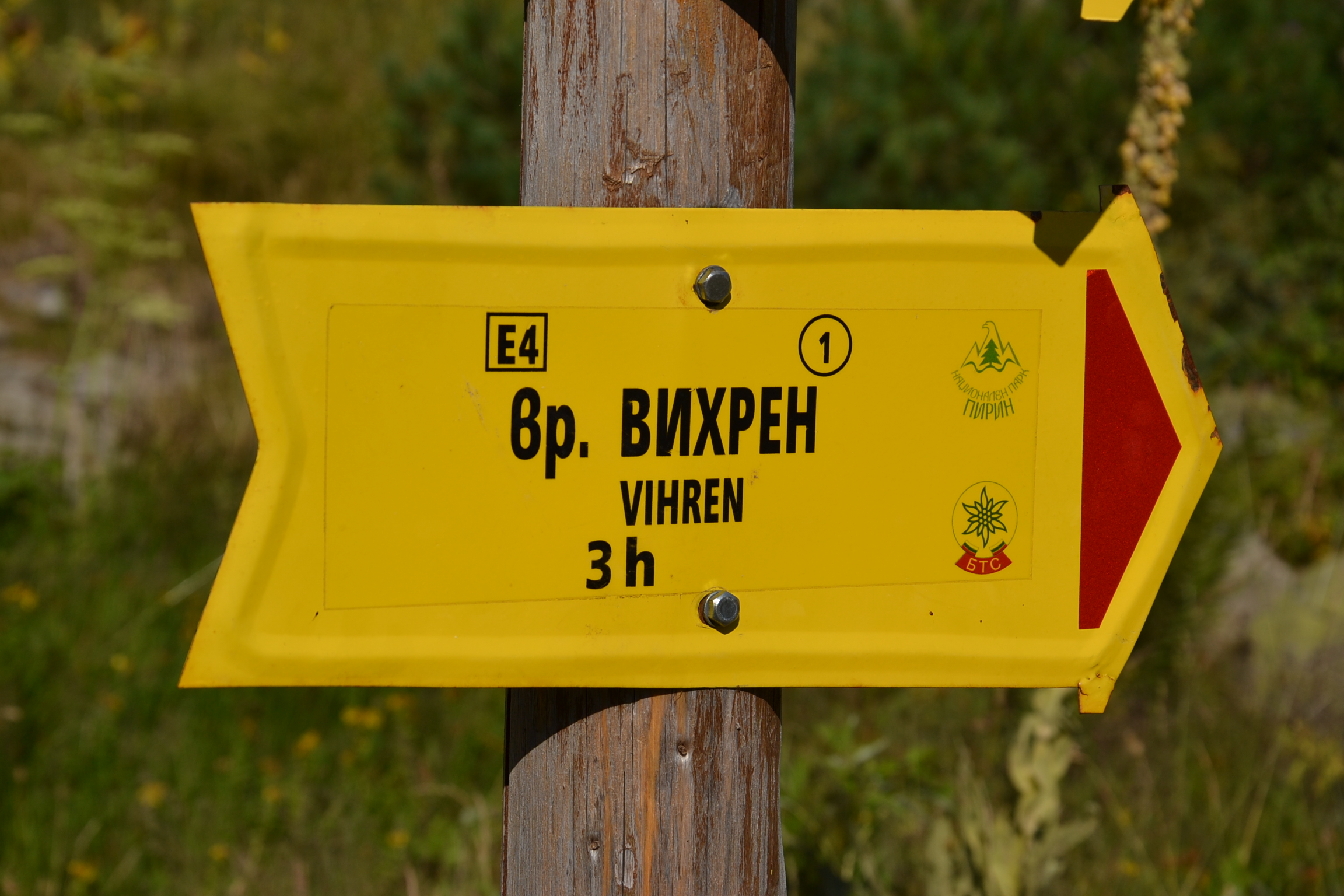
Pirin - sign to Vihren

In Bulgaria, the marked trail begins on the village square of the Sofia suburb of Dragalevtsi. It passes the terminals of the Dragalevtsi chairlift, the ski resort Aleko and the highest peak of the Vitosha mountains, Cherni Vrah, and then leads down the other side of Vitosha, through the Verila hills to Rila.

In the Rila and Pirin Mountains, it is not marked as such, but the main trail leading through those mountains, marked in red, should be followed. Coming from Verila, the trail enters Rila following the Saparevska Vada irrigation ditch. It passes through the Seven Rila Lakes area and then climbs onto the ridge passing Malyovitsa peak. It continues via the shelter Kobilino Branishte, the hut at Ribni Ezera and the hut Macedonia towards the Predel saddle which separates Rila from Pirin.

From Predela, it reaches the main ridge of Pirin via the hut Yavorov and follows it via the three highest peaks of Pirin (Banski Suhodol, Kutelo and Vihren) and the ridge Koncheto, before descending to the Vihren refuge. It continues on the ridge until the Vinarska Porta saddle, and then runs along Tevno Lake and down the Zhelezina stream towards Pirin hut. From there it is the only marked trail leading through the Central Pirin range, passing the peak Orelyak and the hut Popovi Livadi. It ends at Gotsev Vrah of the Slavyanka mountain at the Greek border, where trails lead down to Petrovo, where a bus to Kulata on the border can be taken (via Sandanski). Total length within Bulgaria is 250 km.

- Responsible organisation(s): - (BTU): Tourist Union
- Publication(s): Series of 5 maps with text in Bulgarian, German and English from BTU
- The following (commercial) site provides much free helpful information about hiking in the mountains of Bulgaria: https://www.bghike.com/
- Useful article about the Bulgarian sections of E3, E4 and E8: https://bulguides.com/long-distance-paths/
- Online map with marked tourists paths, which can also find your current location, provided you have mobile coverage: https://map.bgmountains.org/
- Bibliography: In 2017, adventurer Miriam Lancewood and her husband Peter Lancewood, hiked the whole E4 trail, and she shared her experiences in one of her books titled" Alone in the World", and now they live happily ever after, in the off-grid property that they found during the hike-part through the Bulgarian Rhodope mountains. They were featured, interviewed and filmed there for the tv series Ben Fogle: New Lives in the Wild in 2019, series 8, episode 38, in the beautiful area of the E4 trail and it's stunning natural surroundings.

== Greece ==
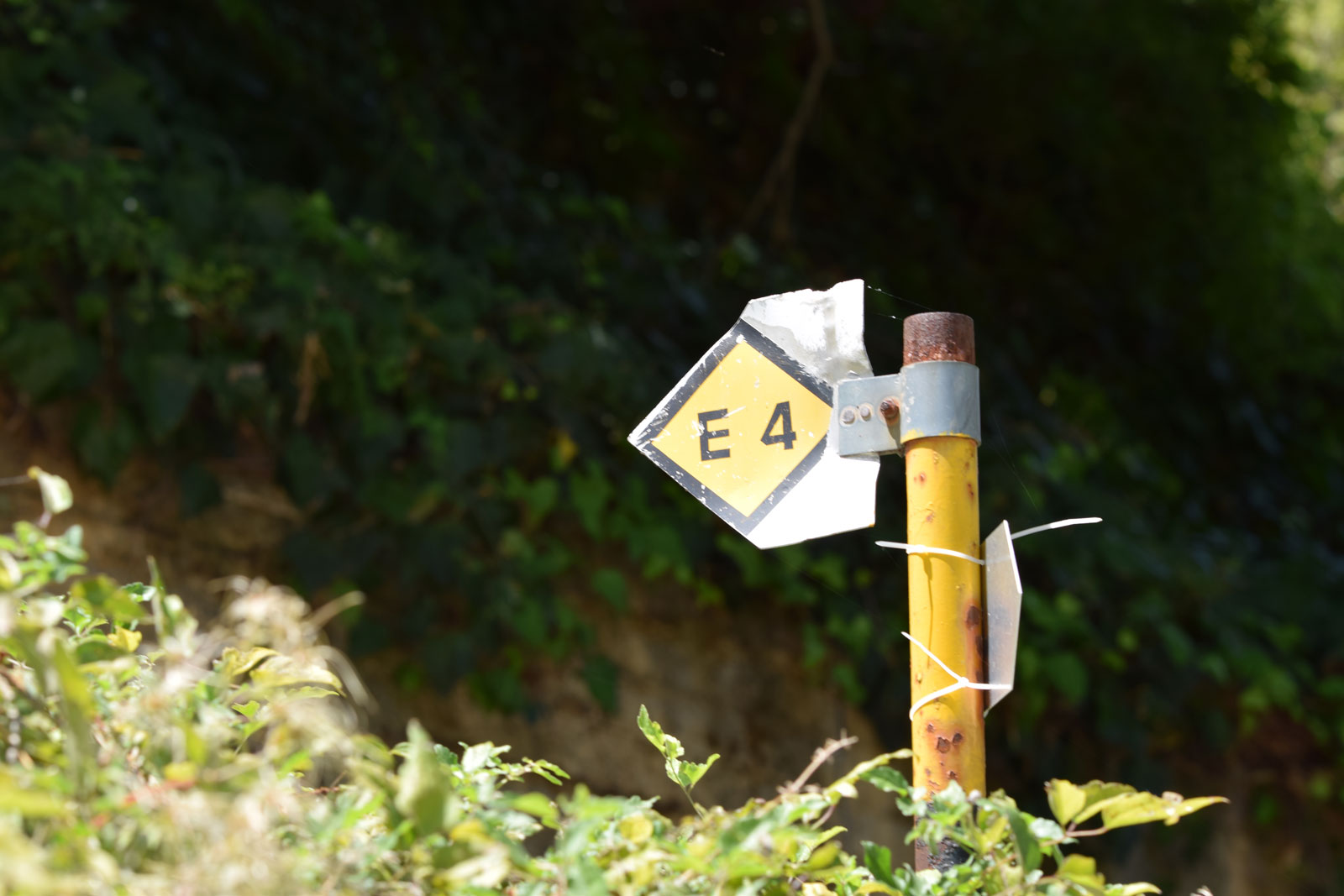
E4 European path sign in the village Ano Doliana of Arcadia, Greece

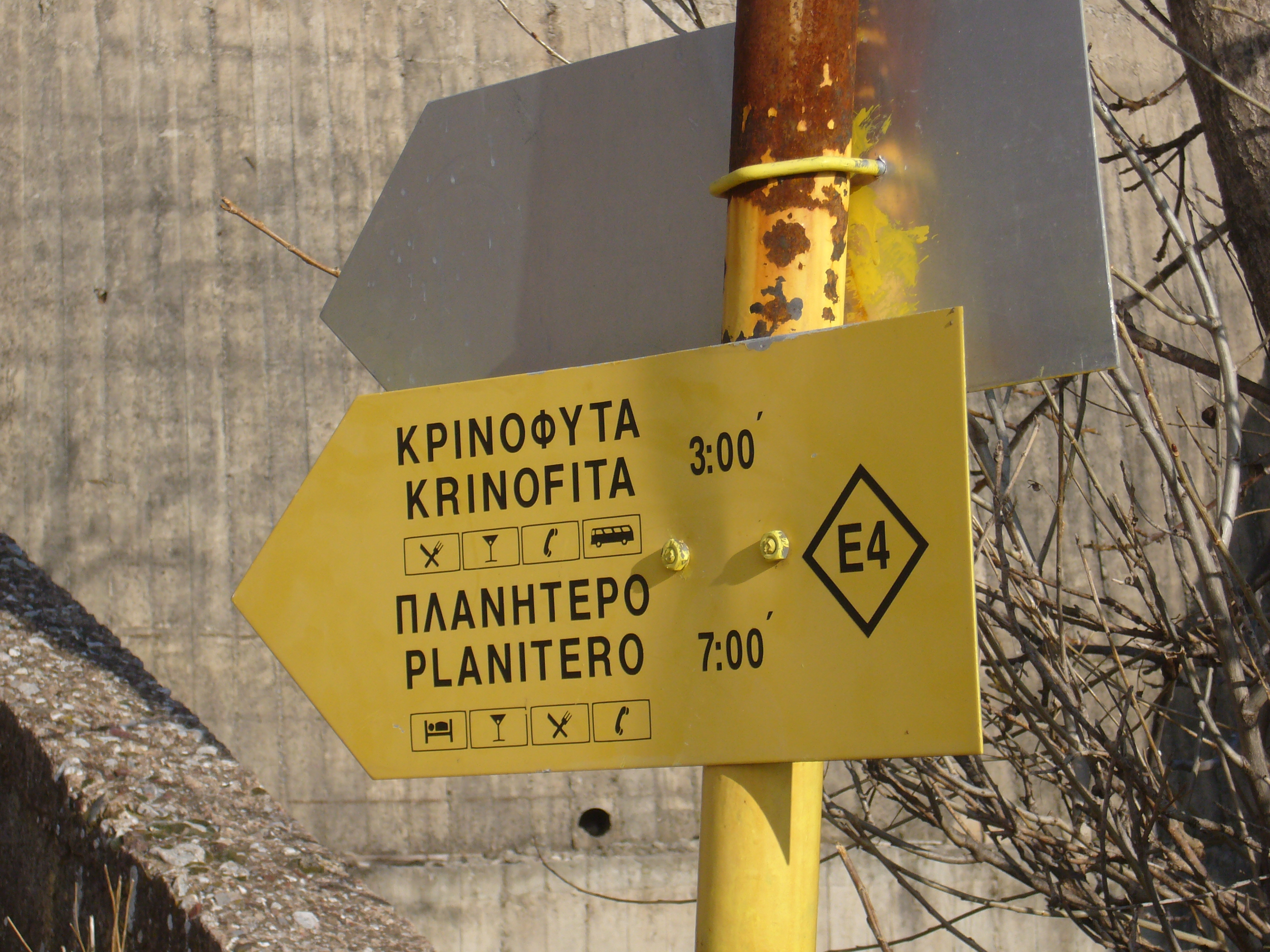

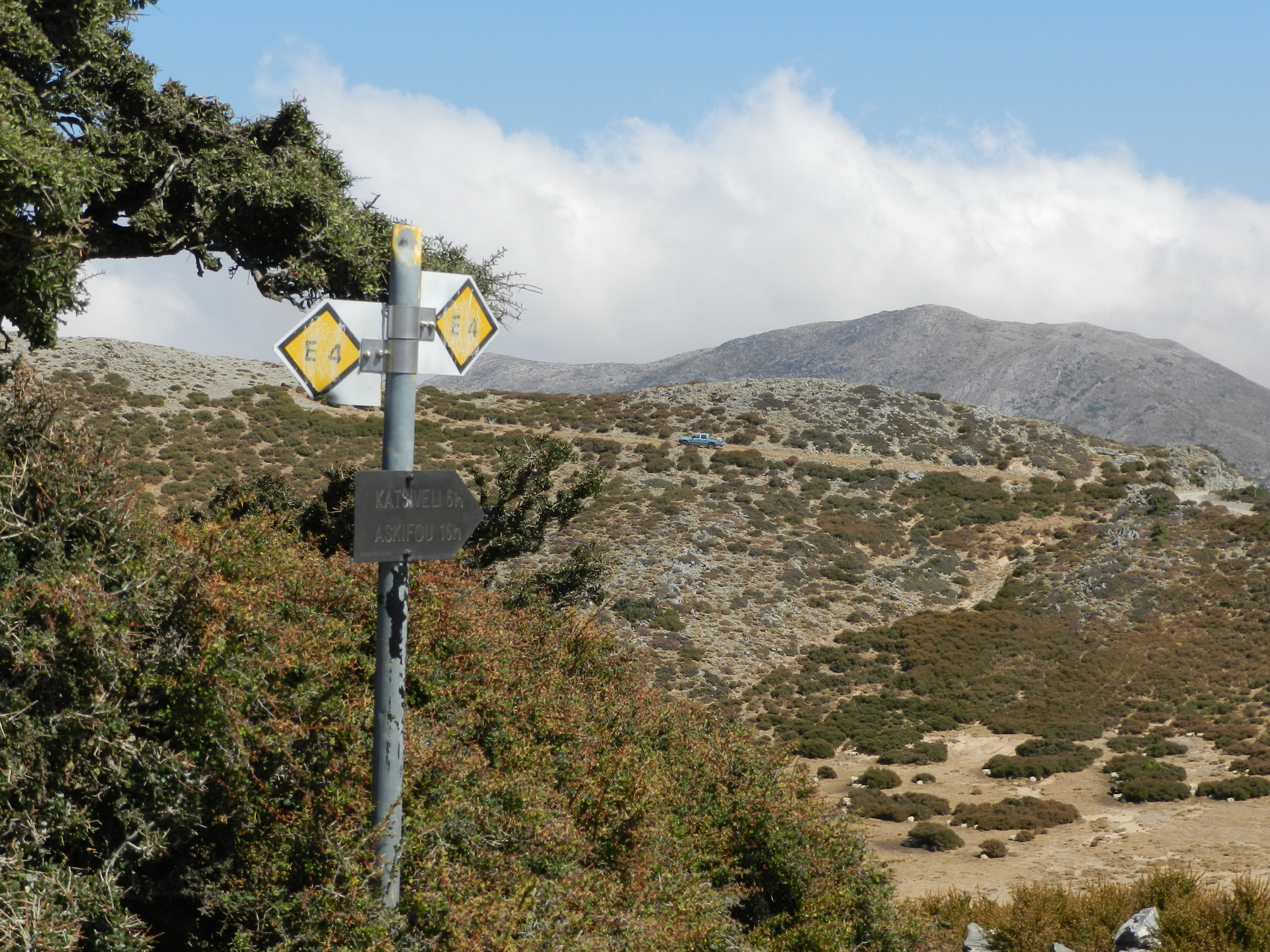
E4 on Crete

=== Introduction ===
An overview of walking in Greece, including sections of E4, can be found in Trekking in Greece (2018) by Tim Salmon and Michael Cullen and there is a guide book in German to the E4 in the Peloponnese by Rolf Roost (see bibliography). However, additional, current local information should be sought whenever possible and while a route exists from the Bulgarian border to the foot of the Peloponnese peninsula, it may be inadequately marked. E4 continues, via ferry from Yithio (Gythio), through Crete. E4 had originally been planned to start out from North Macedonia rather than Bulgaria.

The Greek National Tourist Office suggest that: "The E4 is ideal for hiking from May 15 until early October". However, spring comes to the Peloponnese in April, and "in northern parts and at the higher altitudes ... in June and even July". The north can still be rainy in May, but it should be more settled in Central Greece and the Peloponnese by early May. "There can be snow above 1600-1800m and on north-facing slopes until mid- to late May, [though] not enough to trouble experienced winter hill-walkers". Snow may be a problem on Mount Olympus until mid-June. The Tourist Office comments further: "The areas have a typical Mediterranean climate, with warm dry summers and considerable differences in day and night temperatures. Snowfall starts in November and snow is likely to linger into June".

A walk can take longer than anticipated because of poor way marking, or because paths are blocked, or dangerously eroded, and streams and rivers may be impassable. Walkers should therefore be prepared for long diversions, and never presume that you will reach the intended destination, including the final one, on time, or on a specific day. Flexible planning is advisable. Some sections follow paved roads, but there should be little traffic, in the spring and autumn.

Accommodation is not available every night, so that lightweight camping, or bivouac gear, is necessary, as well as several days supply of food. The Peloponnese "has the advantage of board and lodging for every night of the 14 days that it takes". Bears and wolves are found in the far north of Greece, "but you are much more likely to see signs of their presence than ever catch a glimpse of them". However, the safely guidelines for hiking in bear country should be followed, especially with regard to the storing of food. The Cicerone guide offers invaluable advice on sleeping and eating. In spring, in some areas, there may be springs and/or fast flowing streams, though ample reserves of water should still be carried. With regard to accommodation maps should not be trusted and even if there is a hotel it may only open in July and August, or at weekends. Mountain refuges may not be open. Coffee shops may provide simple meals. Some mountain villages are uninhabited in the winter and will only begin to come alive again after Easter, and not fully until high summer.

The Hellenic Federation of Mountaineering and Climbing is the organisation, along with associated clubs, which has established and maintains E4, and it has published a leaflet about E4 with text in English, French and German, as well as descriptions of E4 and E6, with maps, in English and German.

==== Addresses ====
- Hellenic Federation of Mountaineering and Climbing, 5 Milioni Street, GR-10673 Athina.
- Hellenic Alpine Club Acharnon, Philadelphias Street 12, GR-13671 Acharnas.

==== Bibliography ====
- Tim Salmon, Michael Cullen, Trekking in Greece: The Peloponnese and Pindos Way. Cicerone, 2018
- Rolf Roost, Griechenland: E4 Pelopnnes (Conrad Stein, 2007)
- The Rough Guide to Greece. Latest edition.
- Greece (Lonely Planet). Latest edition.
- Marc S. Dubin, Greece on Foot (1986). Long out of print.
- John Hillaby, Journey to the Gods (1991). A long walk in Greece by a renowned British walker. It should be obtainable.
- Loraine Wilson, The High Mountains of Crete: The White Mountains and South Coast, Psiloritis and Lassithi.
- Gert Hirner and Jakob Murböck, Walking Guide: Crete West (Rother Guides). Originally in German.
- By a Collective, Walking Guide: Crete East (Rother Guides). Originally in German.

==== Maps ====
Maps from Anavasi cover much of the route and some can be bought with a guide book, including the Taygetos 1:25,000 sheet. Moreover Anavasi Edition contains a lot of hiking maps for Pindus Range, Mt. Olympus, Gramos and Smolikas and the Mountains of Central Greece.

=== Route of E4 in mainland Greece ===
From Kulata (Bulgaria) the way crosses the border to Promachon (Promachonas). The route was originally planned to cross from North Macedonia to Florina.

==== Waymarking ====
Aluminum signs: on white background a yellow rhombus with black outline, with the words E4/6 in black. Coloured signs on rocks and trees: white background, a yellow parallelogram on the left and a black on the right.

==== Placenames ====
Because of the transliteration from the Greek alphabet, the spelling of place names can be confusing (some places also have an official and a local, or old, name).

==== Northern Greece ====
Promachon (Promachonas), Rodhopoli, Doirani, Archangelos, Pella, Loutraki, Skopos, Florina (300 km).

Nymphaeo, Amyntaeo (Amyndeo), Rizomata, Dion, Litochoro (Litohoro), Olympus, Kokkinopilos, Meteora, Agrafa, Krassochori, Viviani (Viniani).

==== Central Greece ====
Karpenissi, Artotina, Kaloskopi, Delfi (Delphi), Itea (900 km, from Florina)

==== Peloponnese ====
Diakofto, Kalavryta, Lykouria, Daras, Vytina, Tripoli, Ano Doliana, Sparti, Mystras, Refuge of Taygetos, Kastania, Gythio[n] (Yithio) (300 km). Ferry to Kastelli Kissamou, Crete.

=== Crete ===
The first organized mapping and signage effort of the whole E4 in Crete was made by Giorgis N. Petrakis (Architect - Spatial Planner - Cartographer), and some indicative information on the segments of the trail can be found at : https://www.destinationcrete.gr/en/explore-the-island/e4-at-crete

== Cyprus ==
=== Introduction ===
This new section of the E4 was inaugurated in 2005, and is 539 km long. It connects Larnaka and Pafos international airports, traversing the Troodos mountain range and Akamas peninsula. A brochure has been published by the Cyprus Tourist Organisation (for online information, see external links above).

In 2014 the Orientaction club produced 1/25000 hiking maps of the mountainous region of Cyprus which include a large part of the E4 trail.
