= GR 72 =

French hiking way

Coordinates: 44.4189°N 3.9189°E

- Location: France
- Designation: GR footpath
- Trailheads: Barre-des-Cévennes, Col du Bez
- Use: Hiking

The GR 72 is a long-distance walking route of the Grande Randonnée network in France. The route connects Barre-des-Cévennes with Col du Bez.

Along the way, the route passes through:

- Barre-des-Cévennes
- Cassagnas
- Villefort
- Prévenchères
- Saint-Laurent-les-Bains
- Col du Bez
