= GR footpath =

Long-distance walking trails in Europe

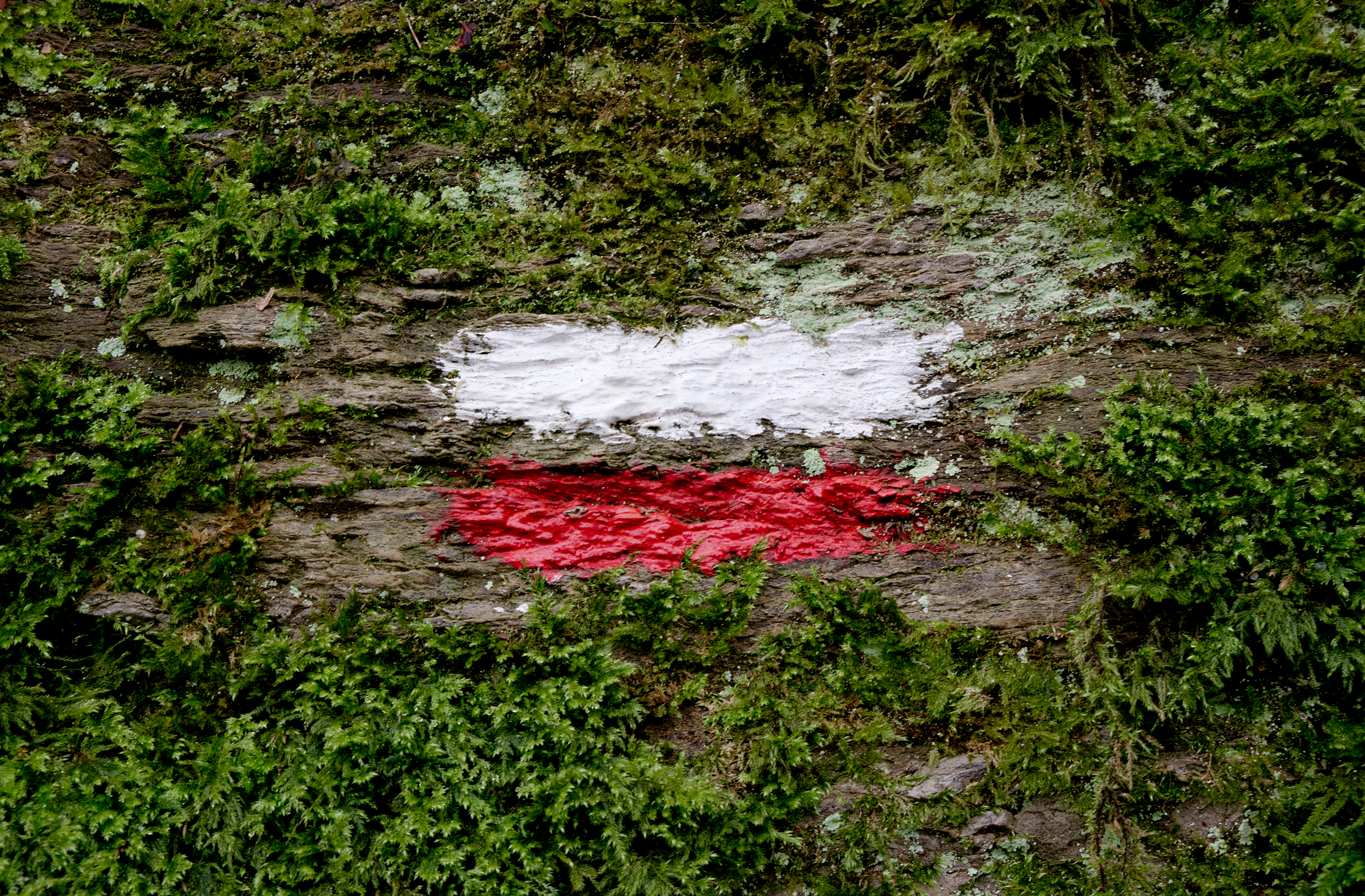
- The characteristic white and red stripes that mark the path of a GR

System information
- Formed: ?
- Notes: Each country has separate numbering systems. It is convention to share numbering for international paths only.

Highway names
- France: GR nn
- Spain: GR nn
- Portugal: GR nn
- Belgium: GR nnn
- Netherlands: LAW nn

System links
- International E-road network; A Class; B Class

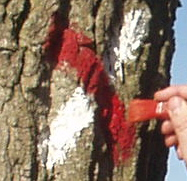
An X marks a trail or direction that deviates from the GR path.

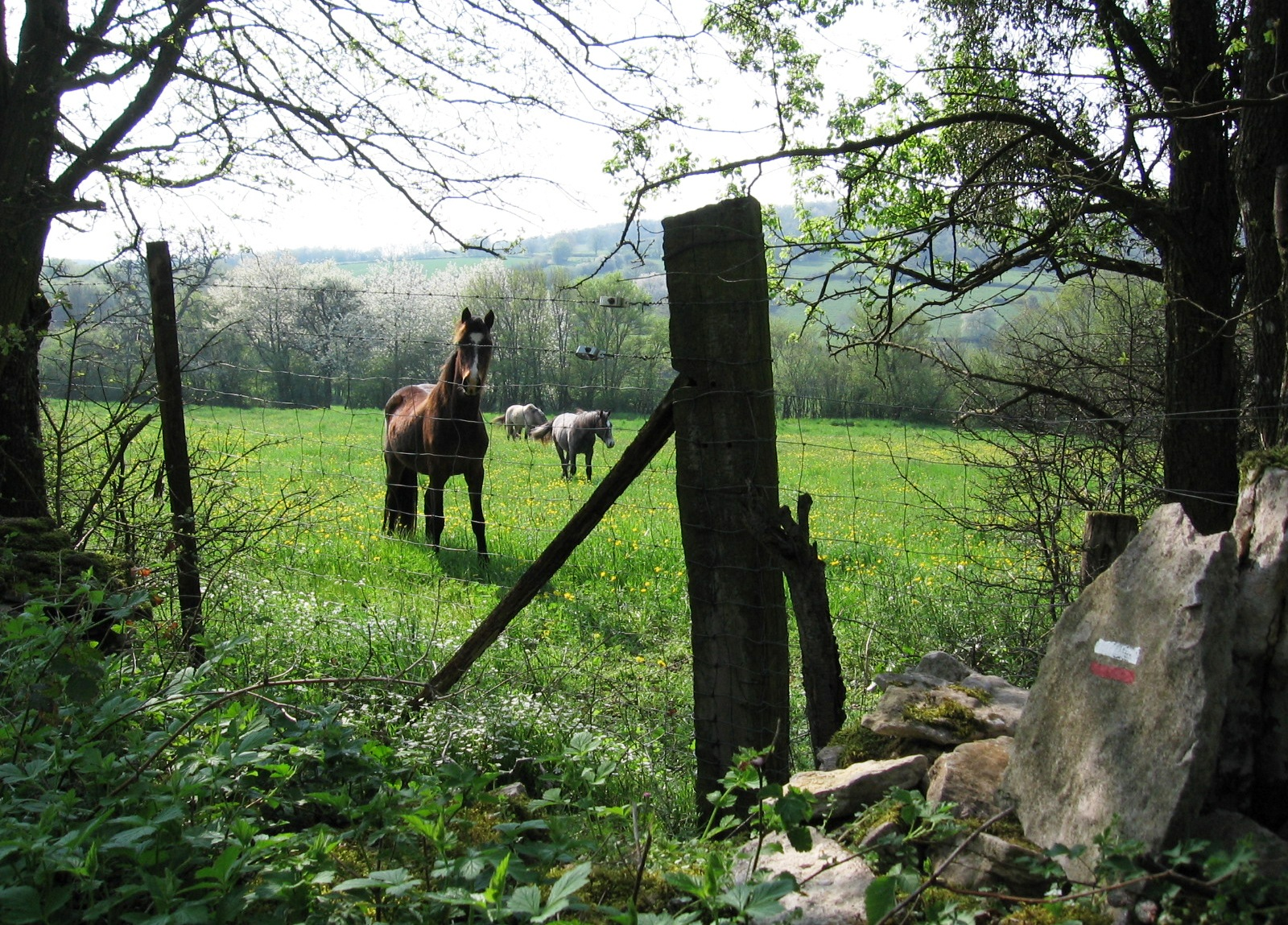
Trailside marker and local observers alongside GR 76A

The GR footpaths are a network of long-distance walking trails in Europe, mostly in France, Belgium, the Netherlands, and Spain. They go by the following names: French: sentier de grande randonnée, West Flemish: Groteroutepad, Dutch: Langeafstandwandelpad, Spanish: sendero de gran recorrido, Portuguese: percurso pedestre de grande rota – generally meaning "long trail" or more literally "great route". The trails in France alone cover approximately 60,000 kilometres (37,000 mi). Trails are blazed with characteristic marks consisting of a white stripe above a red stripe. These appear regularly along the route, especially at places such as forks or crossroads.

The network is maintained in France by the Fédération Française de la Randonnée Pédestre (French Hiking Federation), and in Spain by the Federación Española de Deportes de Montaña y Escalada (Spanish Mountain Sports Federation). Many GR routes make up part of the longer European walking routes which cross several countries.

== Markings ==
The GR trails are marked using a system of blazes that are visible in both directions:

- France, Belgium, Netherlands, and Spain: red and white bars; three subtypes
- Luxembourg: yellow rectangles or circles
- Switzerland: red and white bars or yellow diamonds

Red and white was chosen as the most visible colour combination in natural surroundings. Waymarks are often painted, but may take the form of metal signs in city centers.

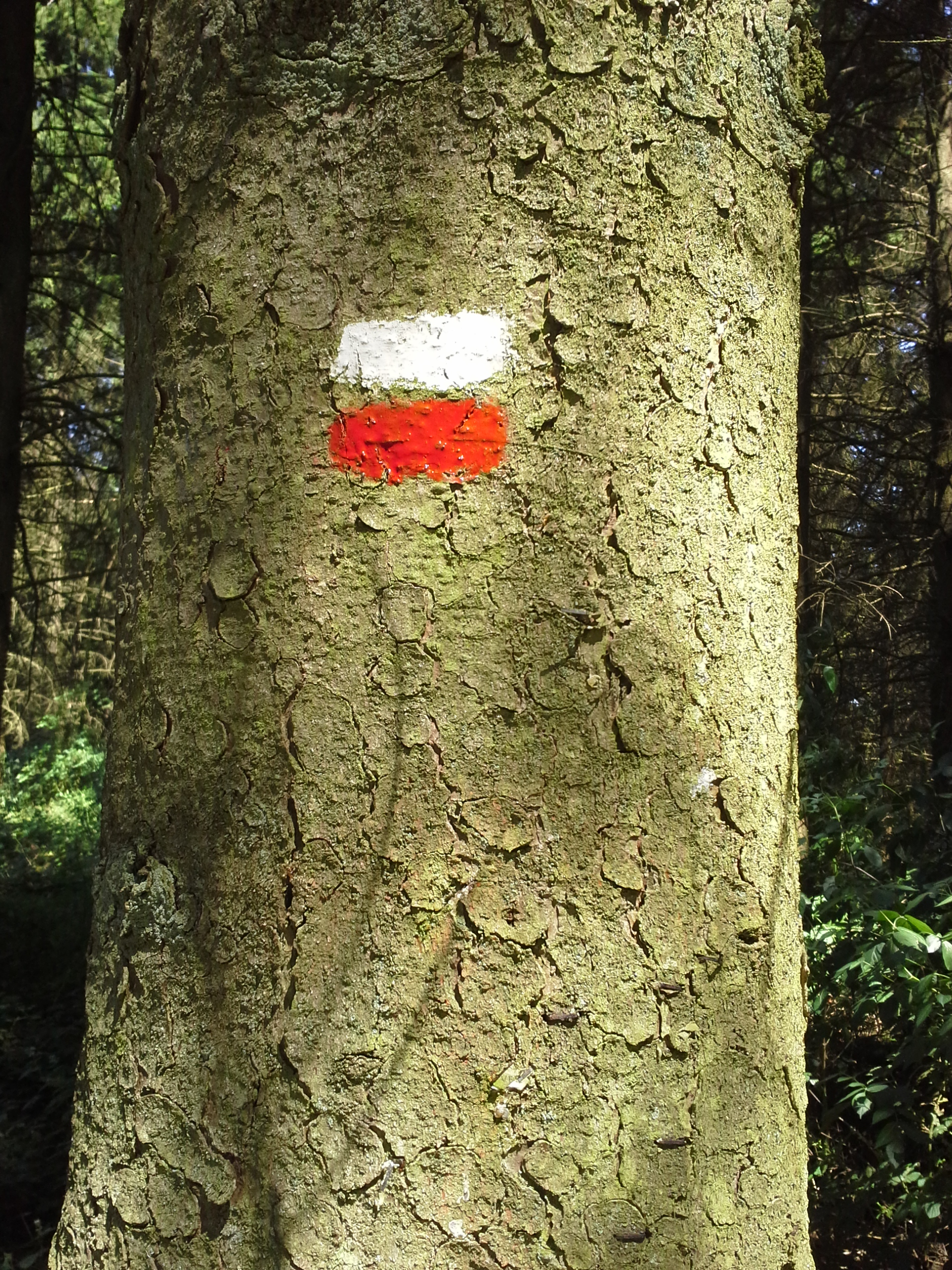
Follow the track

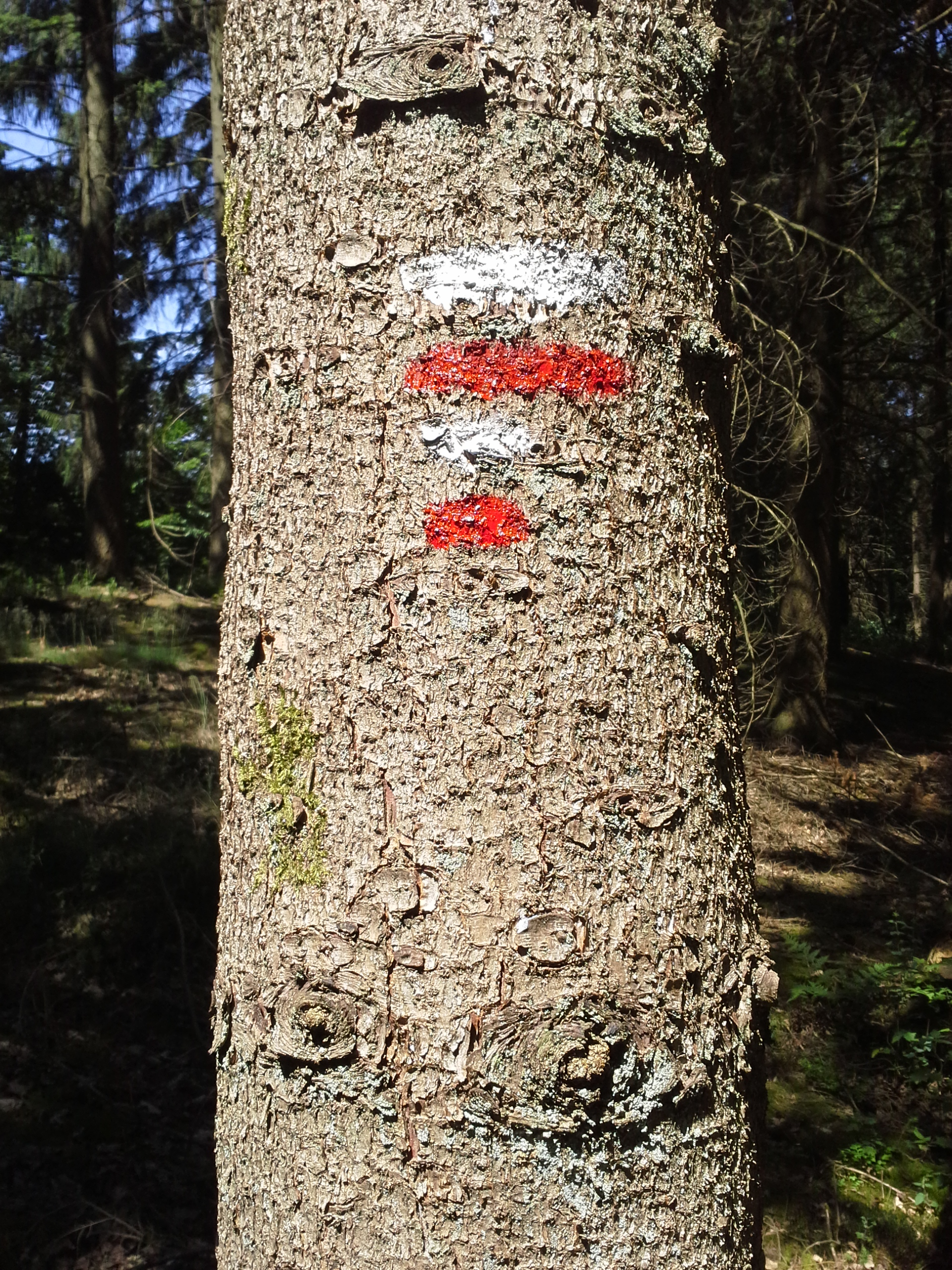
Change direction

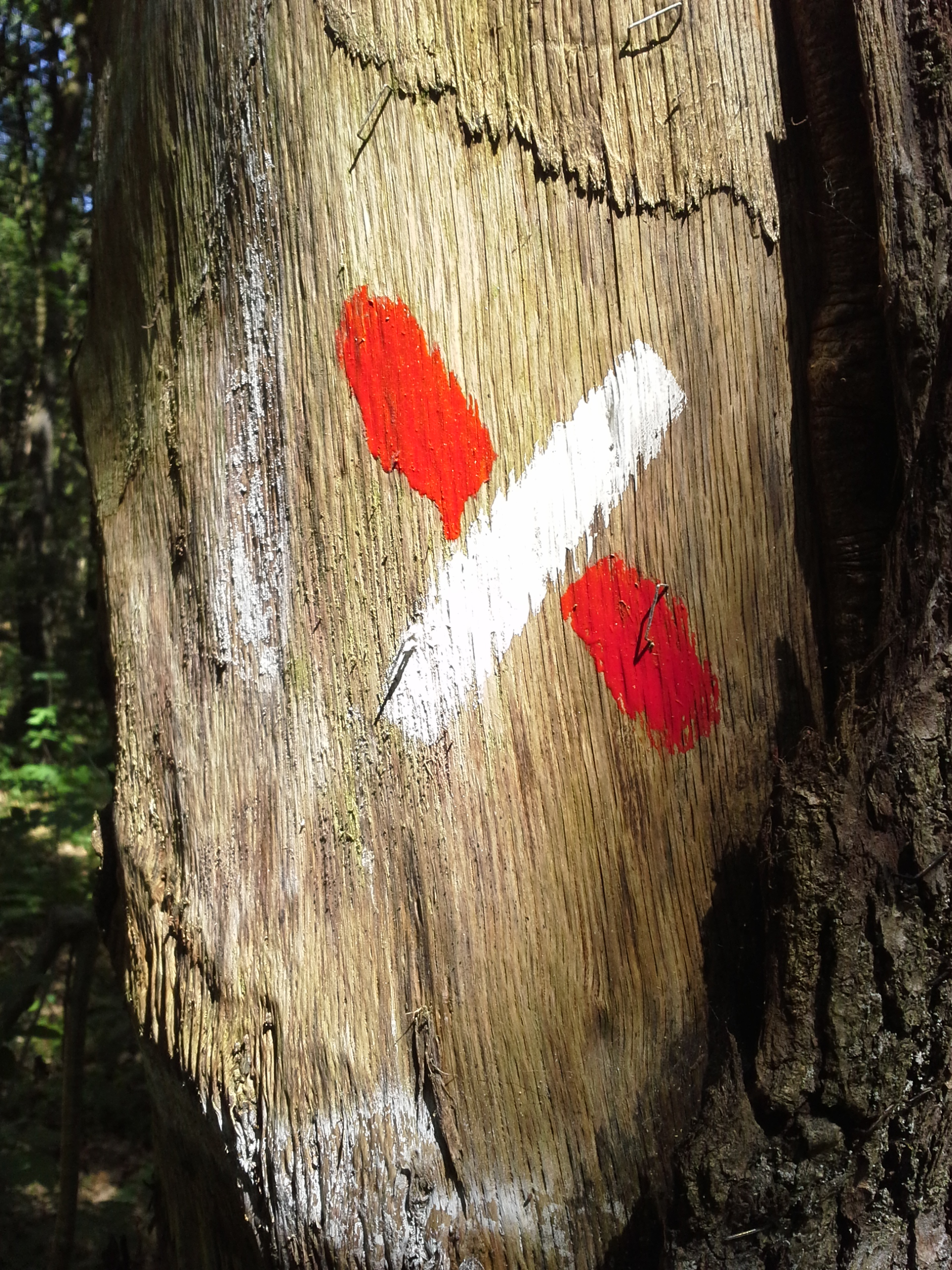
Wrong direction

== GR routes ==
=== France: Grande Randonnée ===
==== Routes 1 to 25 ====
List of Grande Randonnée (GR) paths – 1 to 25
#	Route
GR 1	Chantilly • Coulommiers • Provins • Fontainebleau • Chevreuse • Mantes-la-Jolie
GR 2	Le Havre • Paris • Dijon
GR 3	La Baule • Guérande • Brière • Nantes • Saumur • Orléans • Nevers • Mount Mézenc
GR 4	Royan • Limoges • puy de Dôme • Saint-Flour • Pont-Saint-Esprit • Grasse
GR 5	Hook of Holland • Hasselt • Metz • Belfort • Chamonix • Nice
GR 6	Saint-Véran • Tarascon • Forcalquier • Conques • Langon
GR 7	Ballon d'Alsace • Dijon • Saint-Étienne • Lodève • Andorre-la-Vieille
GR 8	Saint-Brevin-les-Pins • Sare
GR 9	Saint-Amour • Léoncel • Saint-Tropez
GR 10	Hendaye • Arette-la-Pierre-Saint-Martin • Bagnères-de-Luchon • Mérens-les-Vals • Banyuls-sur-Mer • Port-Vendres
GR 11	Cape Higuer • Cap de Creus
GR 12	Amsterdam • Bergen op Zoom • Brussels • Paris
GR 13	Fontainebleau • Bourbon-Lancy
GR 14	Paris • Malmédy • Ardenne
GR 16	Arlon • Bouillon • Monthermé
GR 20	Calenzana • Conca
GR 21	Dieppe • Le Havre • Étretat • Fécamp • Saint-Valery-en-Caux • Veules-les-Roses • Tréport
GR 22	La Perrière • Carrouges • Bagnoles-de-l'Orne • Mortain • Avranches • Mont Saint-Michel
GR 23

==== Routes 26 to 40 ====
List of Grande Randonnée (GR) paths – 26 to 40
#	Route
GR 26	Paris • Villers-sur-Mer
GR 30	Chaîne des Puys • Plomb du Cantal
GR 34	Vitré • Mont Saint-Michel • Saint-Brieuc • Morlaix • Brest • Crozon • Douarnenez • Pointe du Raz • Lorient • Quimperlé
GR 34A	Louannec • Gurunhuel
GR 35	Verneuil-sur-Avre • Seiches-sur-le-Loir
GR 36	Ouistreham • Caen • Saumur • Angoulême • Albi • Carcassonne • Bourg-Madame
GR 37	Vitré • Douarnenez
GR 38	Redon • Douarnenez
GR 39	Mont Saint-Michel • Guérande

==== Routes 41 to 50 ====
List of Grande Randonnée (GR) paths – 41 to 50
#	Route
GR 41	Tours • Farges-Allichamps • Mont-Dore
GR 42	Saint-Étienne • Avignon
GR 43	Col des Faïsses • Sainte-Eulalie
GR 44	Les Vans • Champerboux
GR 46	Tours • Cahuzac-sur-Vère
GR 48

==== Routes 51 to 75 ====
List of Grande Randonnée (GR) paths – 51 to 75
#	Route
GR 51	Mediterranean
GR 52	Menton • le col du Berceau • le col de Trétore • Sospel • Baisse de Linière • Pointe des Trois Communes • Baisse Cavaline • le refuge des Merveilles • Baisse du Basto • La Balme • Madone de Fenestre • le torrent du Boréon • le col de Salèse • le col du Bam • Saint-Dalmas-Valdeblore Near Nice – Breil-sur-Roya to Gorges de Saorge and Vallon de Zouayne.
GR 52A	Mercantour
GR 53	Massif des Vosges
GR 54	Tour of Oisans and the Écrins
GR 55	Vanoise
GR 56	Ubaye
GR 57	Liège • Diekirch
GR 58	Queyras
GR 59	Massif des Vosges • Jura • Bugey • Revermont
GR 60	Montpellier • Saint-Chély-d'Aubrac
GR 65	Genève • Le Puy-en-Velay • Nasbinals • Conques • Figeac • Moissac • Aire-sur-l'Adour • Roncevaux
GR 66	Mont Aigoual
GR 68	Mont Lozère
GR 70	Le Puy-en-Velay • Lozère • Ardèche • Saint-Jean-du-Gard
GR 71	Espérou • Mazamet
GR 71C/D	Larzac
GR 71E
GR 72	Col du Bez • Barre-des-Cévennes
GR 75	Urban path around Paris

==== Routes 101 and above ====
List of Grande Randonnée (GR) paths – 101 and above
#	Route
GR 223	Berville-sur-Mer to Mont Saint-Michel via Côte de Grace, Côte Fleurie, Côte de Nacre, Côte de la Déroute, Côte des Havres, Baie du Mont Saint-Michel
GR 145	The Via Francigena: (Canterbury) – Wissant – Arras – Laon – Châlons-en-Champagne – Besançon – Geneva – (Rome)
GR 380	Monts d'Arrée (Finistère)
GR 400	Circular routes in the Volcan du Cantal area of the Massif Central
GR 2013	urban and suburban trail around Greater Marseilles and Aix-en-Provence

==== GR Préféré des Français ====
Since 2017 the French Hiking Federation has allowed people to vote for the GR Préféré des Français award that goes to peoples favourite trails, for following year.

The winners are:

- 2018 – GR 34 – Destination Baie de Morlaix
- 2019 – GR R1 – Tour du Piton des Neiges (Réunion)
- 2020 – GR 21 – Littoral de Normandie
- 2021 – GR de Pays Grand Pic Saint-Loup
- 2022 – GR de Pays Tour de Belle-Île-en-Mer
- 2023 – GR de Pays Tour de la Suisse Normande
- 2024 – GR 37 – Cœur de Bretagne

=== Spain: Gran Recorrido ===
==== All routes ====
List of Gran Recorrido (GR) paths in Spain
#	Route
GR 1	Empúries • Banyoles • Besalú • Ripoll • Gironella • Sant Llorenç de Morunys • Puente de Montañana • Graus • La Fueva • Montanejos • Ligüerre de Cinca • Abizanda • Alquézar • Loarre • Las Peñas de Riglos • Ayerbe • Fuencalderas • Biel • Uncastillo • Sos del Rey Católico • Ujué • Olite • Larraga • Alto • Los Arcos • Torralba Del Río • Santa Cruz de Campezo • Bernedo • Salinas de Añana • Espejo • Valdegovía • San Pantaleón de Losa • Villamor • Bárcena de Pienza • Torme • Salcedillo • Prioro • Maraña • Finisterre
GR 3	Sendero Central de Catalunya
GR 5	Sitges • Montserrat
GR 7	Algeciras • Andorra
GR 10	Puzol • Aldea del Obispo
GR 11	Pyrenees between Hondarribia (near Irún) and Cap de Creus (near Cadaqués)
GR 71	Path of the Saja Nature Reserve. From the balneary of Corconte (Cantabria) to Sotres (Asturias).
GR 72	Route of Campurrians. From Santillana del Mar to Reinosa (Cantabria).
GR 73	Paved Road of the Blendii (Cantabria y Palencia). From Herrera de Pisuerga to Suances.
GR 74	Eastern Corridor of Cantabria. From Ramales de la Victoria to Reinosa (Cantabria).
GR 92	Eastern and Southern Coasts of Spain. From Portbou, on the French–Spanish border to Tarifa, the most southerly point of Spain. (Passing through the provinces of Catalunya, Valencia, Murcia and Andalucia). GR 92 forms the southern portion of the E10, one of the European long-distance paths. The E10 runs between Finland and Spain.
GR 108	Gijon-Covadonga
GR 132	In La Gomera
GR 142	Alpujarras route
GR 145	Sendero Europeo Arco Atlántico
GR-160	Camino del Cid
GR 221	Ruta de la Pedra en Sec (Balearic Islands): Port d'Andratx – Sant Elm – La Trapa – Estellencs – Banyalbufar – Esporles – Valldemossa – Deià – Port de Sóller – Sóller – Santuari de Lluc – Pollença
GR 222	Ruta de Artà a Lluc (Balearic Islands)
GR 223	Camí de Cavalls (Menorca, Balearic Islands)
GR 236	Route of the Monasteries of Valencia. From Gandia to Alzira (Valencian Community)
GR 249	Gran Senda de Málaga
GR 330	Gran Ruta Costa Blanca Interior. From Dénia to Orihuela in the Province of Alicante

=== Andorra ===
- GRP (Grande Randonee Pays), a circuit of Andorra
- GRT, a route from Spain to Andorra with two variants
- HRP (High Route Pyrenees), combining elements of the GRP and GRT
- GR 7 passes through Spain, France, and Andorra's Madriu-Perafita-Claror Valley
- GR 11 (Spain) passes through Spain, France, and Andorra's Madriu-Perafita-Claror Valley

=== Portugal: Percursos Pedestres de Grande Rota ===
- GR 5 Fojos circular, 35 km (22 mi), Vieira do Minho / Minho
- GR 11-E9 Caminho de Santiago, international, linear
- GR 12-E7 international, linear
- GR 13-E4 Via Algarviana, international, linear, 240 km (150 mi)
- GR 14 Rota dos Vinhos da Europa, international, linear,
- GR 17 Travessia do Alto Coura, circular, 52.3 km (32.5 mi)
- GR 22 Rota das Aldeias Históricas, circular, 540 km (340 mi)
- GR 23 Serra do Caldeirão, circular, 45 km (28 mi)
- GR 26 Terras de Sicó, circular, 9 stages, 200 km (120 mi)
- GR 28 Por Montes e Vales de Arouca, circular, 83 km (52 mi)
- GR 29 Rota dos Veados, circular, 53 km (33 mi)
- GR 30 Grande Rota das Linhas de Torres, circular, 112 km (70 mi), Lisboan and Vale do Tejo
- GR 33 Grande Rota do Zêzere, linear, 370 km (230 mi)
- GR 45 Grande Rota do Côa, linear
- GR 117 Geira Romana, international, linear
- Travessia do Alvão, circular, 54 km (34 mi)
- Travessia da Ribeira Minho, linear, 95.7 km (59.5 mi)
- Soajo Peneda, circular, 77 km (48 mi)

=== Belgium: Grote Routepaden or Grande Randonnée ===
List of Grote Routepaden or Grande Randonnée paths (GR) in Belgium
#	Route
GR 5	North Sea to Mediterranean: Bergen op Zoom • Liège • Diekirch • Nice
GR 5A	Antwerp • Bruges • De Panne • Ronse (loop)
GR 12	Amsterdam • Bergen op Zoom • Brussels • Paris
GR 14	Malmedy • Sedan
GR 15	Monschau • Martelange
GR 16	Semois Path: Arlon • Monthermé
GR 56	East Cantons: Malmedy • Botrange • Monschau • Sankt-Vith (loop)
GR 57	Ourthe valley: Liège • Diekirch
GR 121	Braine-le-Comte • Boulogne-sur-Mer
GR 122	Zeeland – Champagne – Ardenne: Hulst • Son
GR 123	Tour of West Hainaut: loop from Tournai
GR 125	Tour between the Sambre and the Meuse: loop from Walcourt
GR 126	Brussels • Membre-sur-Semois
GR 128	Wissant • Kemmel • Maastricht • Aachen
GR 129	Bruges • Dinant • Arlon
GR 130	Maldegem • Stavele
GR 412	Terrils path: Bernissart • Blegny
GR 512	Flemish Brabant: Diest • Geraardsbergen
GR 561	Diest • Valkenswaard • Lanaken • Maastricht
GR 563	Land of Herve: loop Dalhem • Berneau • Eupen
GR 564	Loonse Route: Lommel • Huy
GR 565	Renier Snieders path (or Reinier Schniederspad): Antwerp • Bladel
GR 571	Valleys of the Legends: Comblain-au-Pont • Nonceveux
GR 573	Angleur • Pepinster • Eupen • Botrange • Pepinster
GR 575	Tour of Namurois Condroz: loop from Andenne
GR 576	Tour of Liègeois Condroz: loop from Huy
GR 577	Tour of the Famenne: loop from Marche-en-Famenne
GR 579	Brussels • Liège
GR Ijzer	Buysscheure • Nieuwpoort from the source to the mouth of the river Yser
GR Hageland	loop from Leuven
GR Kempen	loop from Turnhout
GR Mol-Om	loop from Mol
GR Reynaertland	Hulst • Rupelmonde

=== Netherlands: Langeafstandswandelpaden ===
List of Langeafstandswandelpaden paths (LAW) in the Netherlands
#	Route
LAW 1-1	Friese Woudenpad: Lauwersoog • Steenwijk
LAW 1-2	Pionierspad: Steenwijk • Muiden
LAW 1-3	Floris V-pad: Amsterdam • Muiden • Bergen op Zoom
LAW 2	Trekvogelpad: Bergen aan Zee • Amsterdam • Ede • Enschede
LAW 3	Marskramerpad: Bad Bentheim • Deventer • Amersfoort • Leiden • The Hague
LAW 4	Maarten van Rossumpad: 's-Hertogenbosch • Arnhem • Apeldoorn • Zwolle • Ommen • Steenwijk
LAW 5-1	Nederlands Kustpad deel 1: Sluis or Bergen op Zoom • Goedereede • Hook of Holland
LAW 5-2	Nederlands Kustpad deel 2: Hook of Holland • The Hague • Haarlem • Den Helder or Den Oever
LAW 5-3	Nederlands Kustpad deel 3: Den Oever or Stavoren • Lauwersoog • Bad Nieuweschans
LAW 6	Grote Rivierenpad: Hook of Holland • Leerdam • Nijmegen • Kleve
LAW 7-1	Pelgrimspad part 1: Amsterdam • 's-Hertogenbosch
LAW 7-2	Pelgrimspad part 2: 's-Hertogenbosch • Maastricht or Visé
LAW 8	Zuiderzeepad: Enkhuizen • Amsterdam • Kampen • Stavoren • Enkhuizen
LAW 9-1	Pieterpad part 1: Pieterburen • Vorden
LAW 9-2	Pieterpad part 2: Vorden • Mount Saint Peter
LAW 10	Noaberpad: Bad Nieuweschans • Winterswijk • Kleve • Milsbeek
LAW 11	Grenslandpad: Sluis • Bergen op Zoom • Thorn
LAW 12	Overijssels Havezatenpad: Steenwijk • Zwolle • Oldenzaal
LAW 13	Hertogenpad: Breda • 's-Hertogenbosch • Uden • Roermond
LAW 14	Groot Frieslandpad: Bergen aan Zee • Enkhuizen • Stavoren • Leer
LAW 15	Westerborkpad: Amsterdam • Amersfoort • Westerbork
LAW 16	Romeinse Limespad: Katwijk • Utrecht • Berg en Dal • Xanten
LAW 17	Waterliniepad: Volendam • Haarlem • Utrecht • Gorinchem • Dordrecht

== See also ==
- European long-distance paths
