= GR 11 =

GR 11 may refer to:

- GR 11 (France), a long-distance footpath in Île-de-France.
- GR 11 (Spain), a long-distance footpath in the Spanish Pyrenees.
