= GR 11 (France) =

Long-distance footpath in the Île-de-France region of France

Coordinates: 48.3672°N 2.7505°E

GR11
- Location: Île-de-France
- Designation: GR footpath
- Trailheads: Circular
- Use: Hiking
- Difficulty: Easy
- Season: All seasons

GR 11 is a long-distance footpath in the Île-de-France region of France. It is part of an extensive national network of rural hiking trails. It follows a circular route around Paris, going through the departments of Val d'Oise, Seine-et-Marne, Essonne and Yvelines. Towns passed through include Chantilly, Senlis, Fontainebleau, Provins, Mantes-la-Jolie and Chevreuse. The circle is much wider than that followed by the GR 1, which also rings Paris.

== See also ==
- GR footpath
- European long-distance paths
