= GR 57 =

GR57
- A view on the road to Santiago de Compostela
- Length: 265 km (165 mi)
- Location: Belgium and Luxembourg
- Designation: GR footpath
- Trailheads: Veille Foulerie, Diekirch
- Use: Hiking

The GR 57 or Vallée de l'Ourthe et Sentier du nord is a GR footpath between Belgium and Luxembourg. About 265 km long, it goes through four regions:

- The city and surroundings of Liège
- The valley of the Ourthe
- The Sûre and the basin of the Rhine
- The Oesling and Gutland

== Route ==
Veille Foulerie (Barchon), Jupille, Liège, Angleur, Tilff, Esneux, Comblain-au-Pont, Durbuy, Hotton, La Roche-en-Ardenne, Houffalize, Gouvy, Troisvierges, Clervaux, Kautenbach, Lipperscheid, Diekirch.
