= GR 56 =

Hiking trail in Belgium

GR56
- Length: 200 km (120 mi)
- Location: Belgium
- Designation: GR footpath, European walking route
- Trailheads: St. Vith, Malmedy
- Use: Hiking

The GR 56 is a hiking trail in southeast Belgium from St. Vith to Malmedy. The approximately 200 km long trail is part of the GR long-distance hiking trail network (France, Belgium, the Netherlands and Spain). The GR 56 was one of the first GR long-distance trails in Belgium and is traditionally marked in white and red stripes.

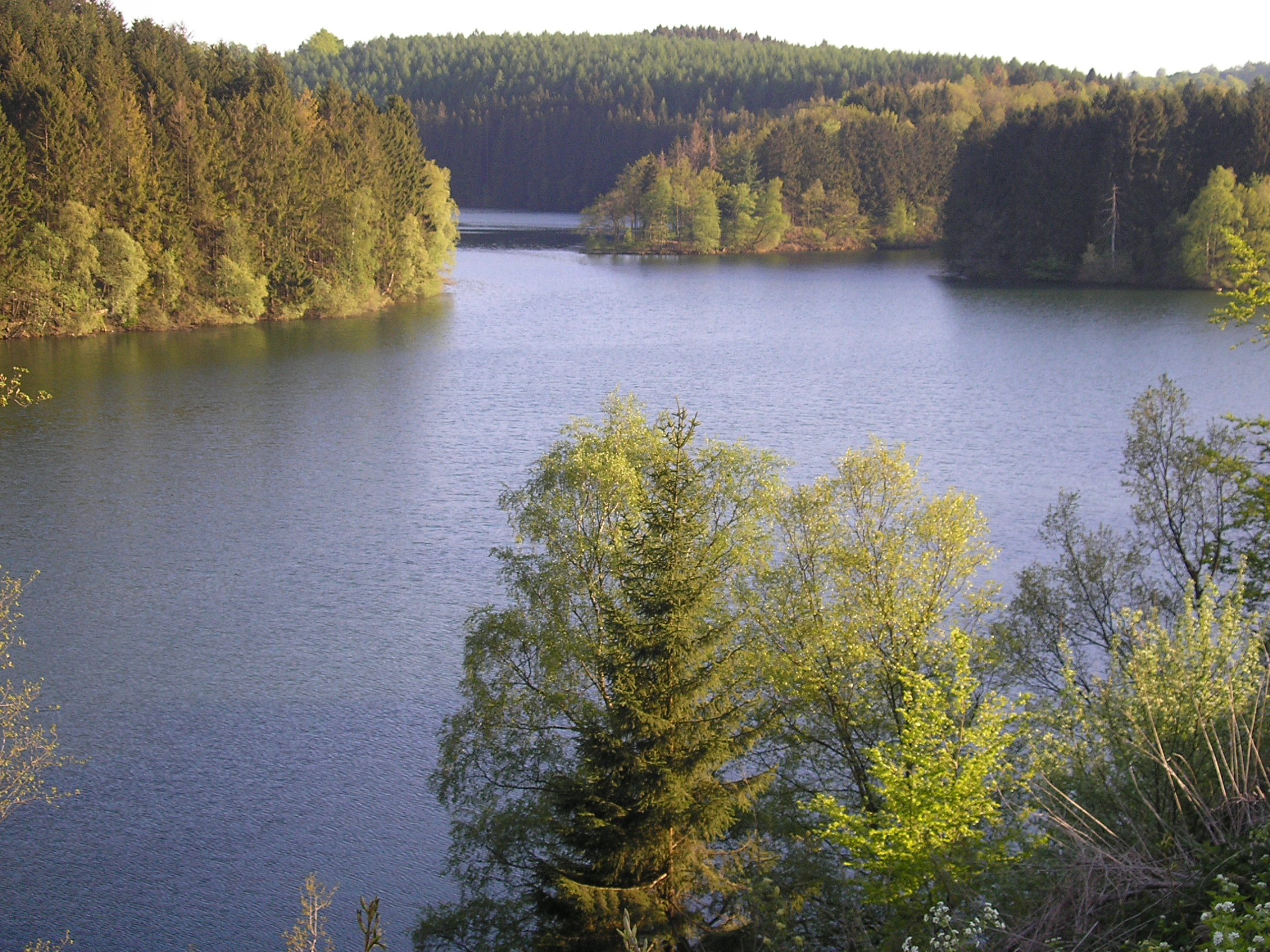
Lake Robertville

The GR trail 56 leads from St. Vith to Malmedy. The route from Sankt Vith, via Hohe Venn to Monschau, through the Belgian nature park Eifel to Burg-Reuland. The minimum distance of the entire route is 164 km and the longest around the 200 km.

In 2011, the GR 56 was extended by two cross-links through the Amblève and Warche-valley.

== Literature ==
- Topo Guide GR 56
