= GR 44 =

Long-distance footpath in France

Coordinates: 44.4723°N 3.7823°E

- Location: France
- Designation: GR footpath
- Trailheads: Champerboux, Les Vans
- Use: Hiking

The GR 44 is a long-distance walking route of the Grande Randonnée network in France. The route connects Champerboux with Les Vans.

Along the way, the route passes through:

- Champerboux
- Col de Montmirat
- Mas-d'Orcières
- Villefort
- Chambonas
- Les Vans
