= GR 12 =

Coordinates: 49.5203°N 4.0821°E

GR12
- Designation: GR footpath
- Trailheads: Amsterdam, Paris
- Use: Hiking

The GR12 (Grande Randonnée) is a transnational long-distance hiking trail and leads from Amsterdam via Brussels to Paris. Of the 977 km of the GR 12, 222 km run in the Netherlands, 197 km in Flanders, 212 km in Wallonia and the longest section of 346 km in France.

The Dutch part of the trail between Amsterdam and Bergen op Zoom is better known as the Dutch long-distance network as Floris V-pad LAW 1–3.

== Route ==
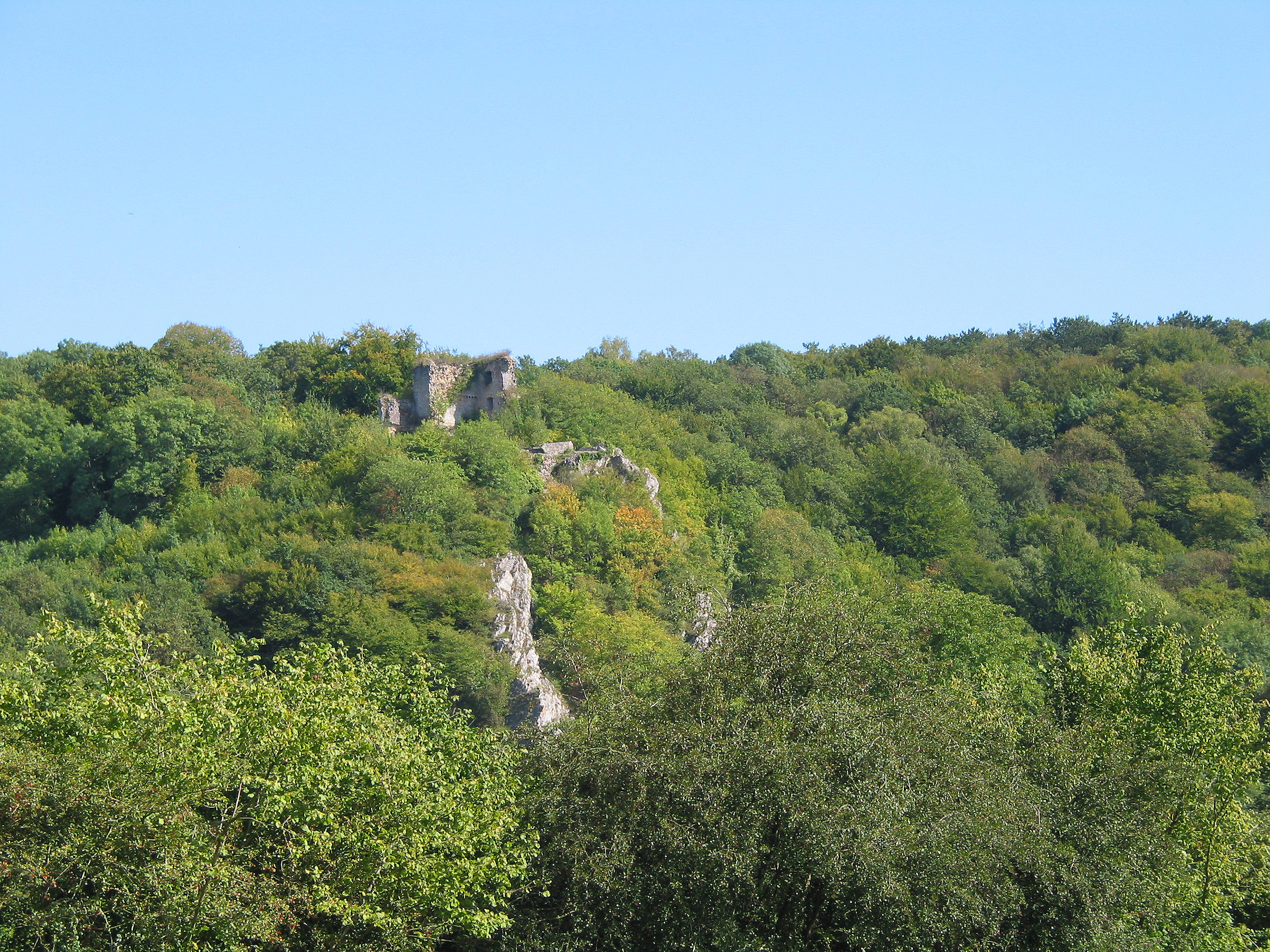
Old castle near Dourbes at the French part of GR 12

From north to south, the route passes through:

- Netherlands: Amsterdam, Muiden, Woerden, Schoonhoven, Dordrecht, Willemstad, Bergen op Zoom
- Belgium: Antwerp, Lier, Mechelen, Brussels, Braine-le-Château, Anderlues, Walcourt, Viroinval
- France: Rocroi, Signy-l'Abbaye, Amifontaine, Soissons, Pierrefonds, Verberie, Senlis, Coye-la-Forêt

In Belgium the route leads north via Antwerp and Brussels past Reims and finally to Paris. The route passes the cities of Bergen-op-Zoom, Deurne, Lier, Mechelen, Grimbergen and Brussels. From there on to Ukkel, Beersel, Braine-le-Chateau, Ronquieres, Walcourt, Dourbes, Olly, Moulin-Manteau, Rocroi and before Paris Montcornet.

The landforms extend over the almost 1000 km of Dutch polders, the small-scale parts of Flanders, the forests in southern Belgium and northern France to the open hilly landscapes near Reims. The trail is also used as a "feeder" for pilgrimages to Santiago.
