= GR 42 =

Long-distance walking route in France

Coordinates: 44.6637°N 4.7296°E

- Location: France
- Designation: GR footpath
- Trailheads: Beaucaire, Saint-Étienne
- Use: Hiking

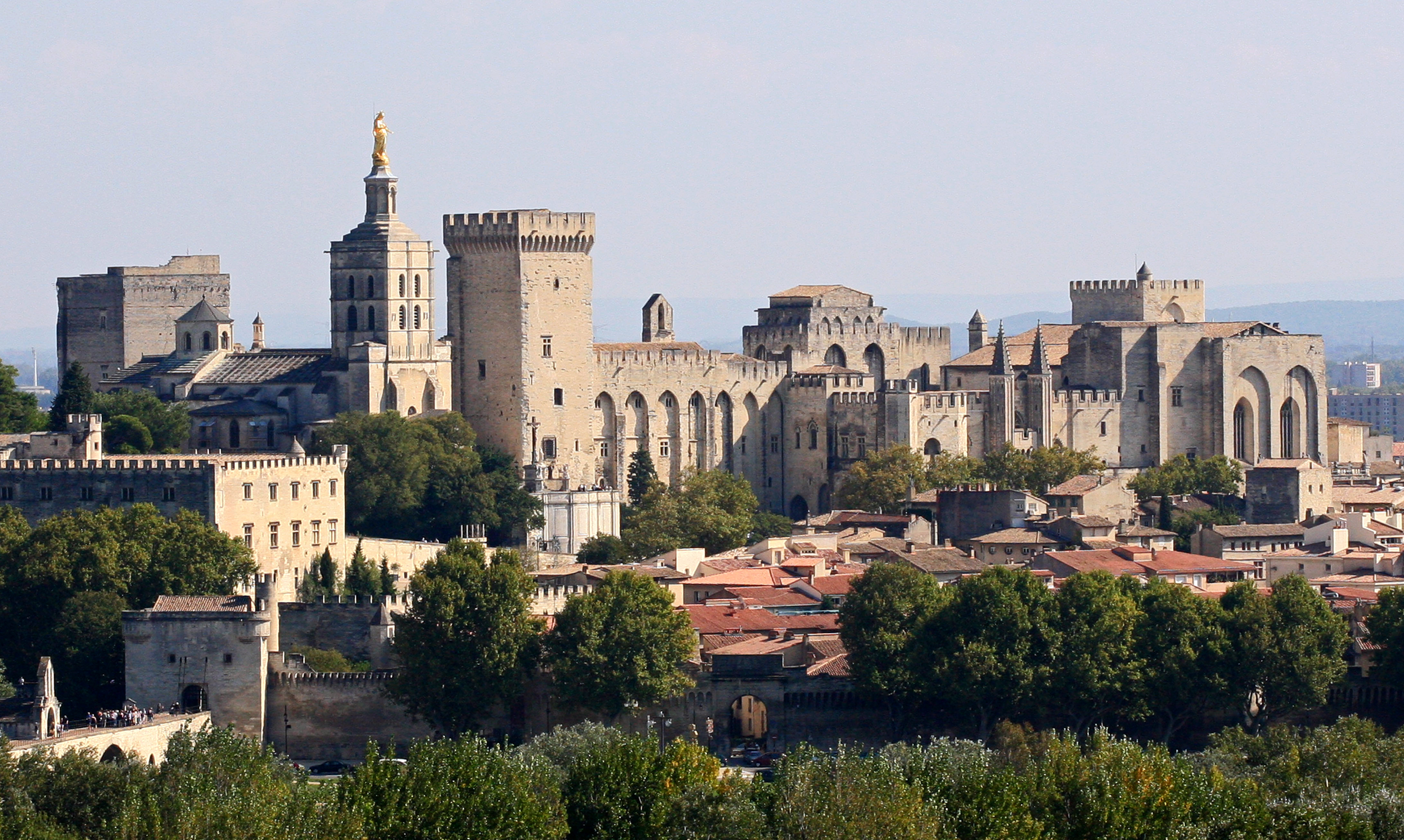
Avignon, Palace of the Popes from Tour Philippe le Beau

The GR 42 is a long-distance walking route of the Grande Randonnée network in France. The route connects Beaucaire with Saint-Étienne.

Along the way, the route passes through:

- Beaucaire
- Pujaut
- Orsan
- Meysse
- Plats
- Bourg-Argental
- Saint-Étienne
