= GR 132 =

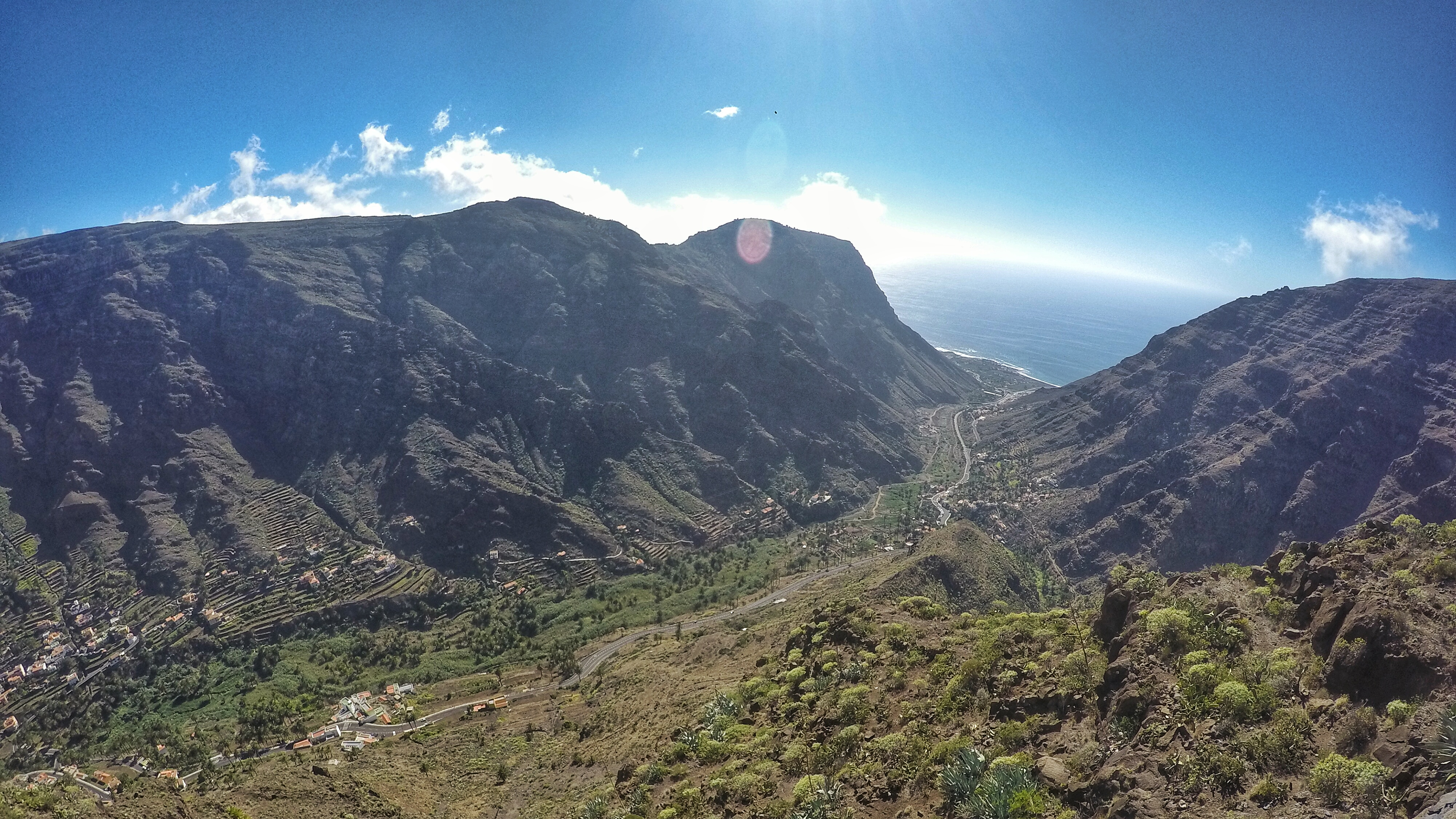
- Valle Gran Rey, one of the towns on the trail
- Location: Spain
- Designation: GR footpath
- Use: Hiking
- Difficulty: Hard

The GR 132 is a long-distance walking route in La Gomera, Canary Islands, Spain. It's part of the extensive GR footpath network of paths, tracks and trails. It's a well marked loop with a starting point in San Sebastián de La Gomera, the island's capital city. GR 132 is about 120-140 kilometres long, depending on the trail's variation.
