= GR 21 =

Long-distance hiking trail in Normandy, France

Coordinates: 49.8351°N 0.5987°E

GR21
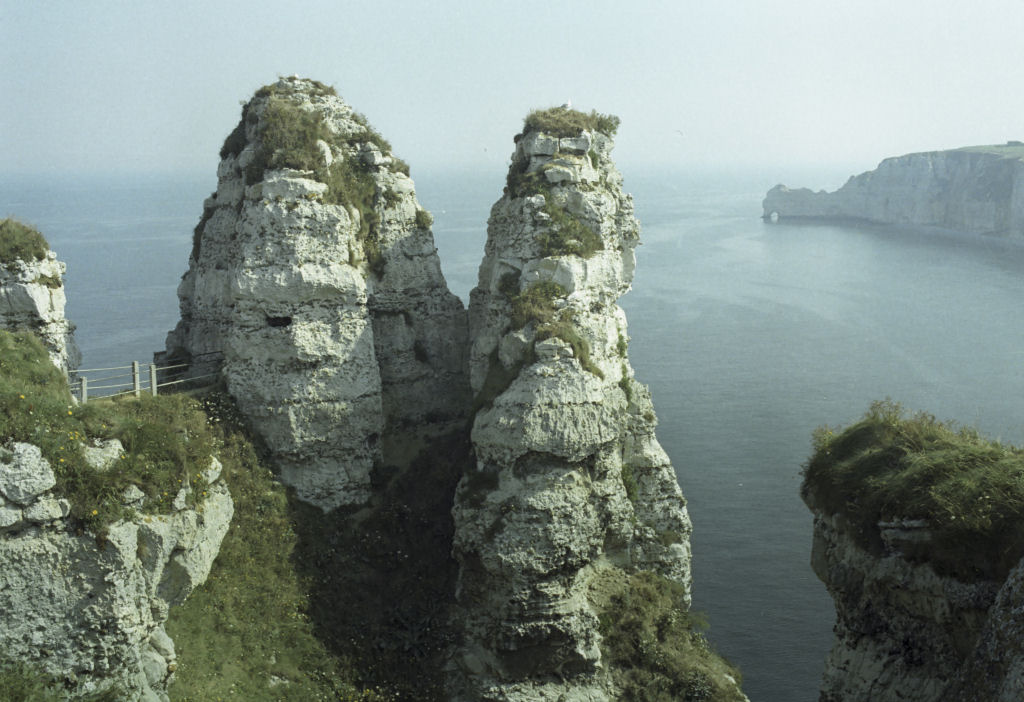
- Location: Pays de Caux, along the Normandy coast
- Designation: GR footpath
- Trailheads: Le Havre, Le Tréport
- Use: Hiking
- Difficulty: Easy/moderate
- Season: All seasons
- Sights: Le Havre, Étretat chalk formations, Varengeville-sur-Mer (tomb of Georges Braque), Dieppe

The GR21 is a long-distance hiking trail in Normandy, France. It is part of the GR network of trails. It begins at the port city of Le Havre, a Unesco World Heritage Site (for its post-World War II modernist architecture), climbs through parkland to Montivilliers, then follows the chalk cliffs of the Pays de Caux for most of the route. Étretat is known for its chalk formations, painted by Claude Monet and other artists. It passes through various seaside resorts and fishing villages, including the port of Dieppe and finishes at the resort of Le Tréport, close to the historic town of Eu. The whole route is within the Seine-Maritime département.
