= GR 71 =

Long-distance walking route in France

Coordinates: 43.7981°N 3.1860°E

- Location: France
- Designation: GR footpath
- Trailheads: L'Espérou, Mazamet
- Use: Hiking

The GR 71 is a long-distance walking route of the Grande Randonnée network in France. The route connects L'Espérou with Mazamet.

Along the way, the route passes through:

- L'Espérou
- La Couvertoirade
- Soubès
- Lodève
- Cambon-et-Salvergues
- Fraisse-sur-Agout
- Mazamet
