= GR 128 =

Hiking trail in France, Belgium and the Netherlands

The GR 128 is a long-distance hiking trail in northern France, Belgium, and the Netherlands, in an east–west direction ending in Germany.

It is part of the GR footpath network of European long-distance trails.

A total distance of 678 km or 421 miles

== Route of Trail ==
- Through France

The trail starts at Wissant near Calais on the English Channel coast, and passes Guînes and Licques.

Heading to the Canal de la Haute Colme at Watten then passing north of Saint-Omer to Cassel then reaching Bailleul the last town in French section.

- Through Belgium

Going onto the Belgium section starting at Kemmel going through the Heuvelland area, and then passes south of Ypres.

The next major town is Roeselare then passing south at Tielt going through Deinze onto the major urban area of Ghent.

Pass north of Wetteren onto Dendermonde, then go south passing the outskirts of Brussels, passing Zemst onto the large town of Leuven.

Pass south of Tienen, then north of Sint-Truiden go onto Tongeren, then cross the Canal Albert, and over the Netherlands border to Maastricht.

- Through Holland

The trail heads south along the River Meuse back to Belgium again to Sint-Martens-Voeren, heading back to Netherlands, then crossing into Germany, with the trail ending in Aachen.
