= Maraña =

Maraña, Spain
- village
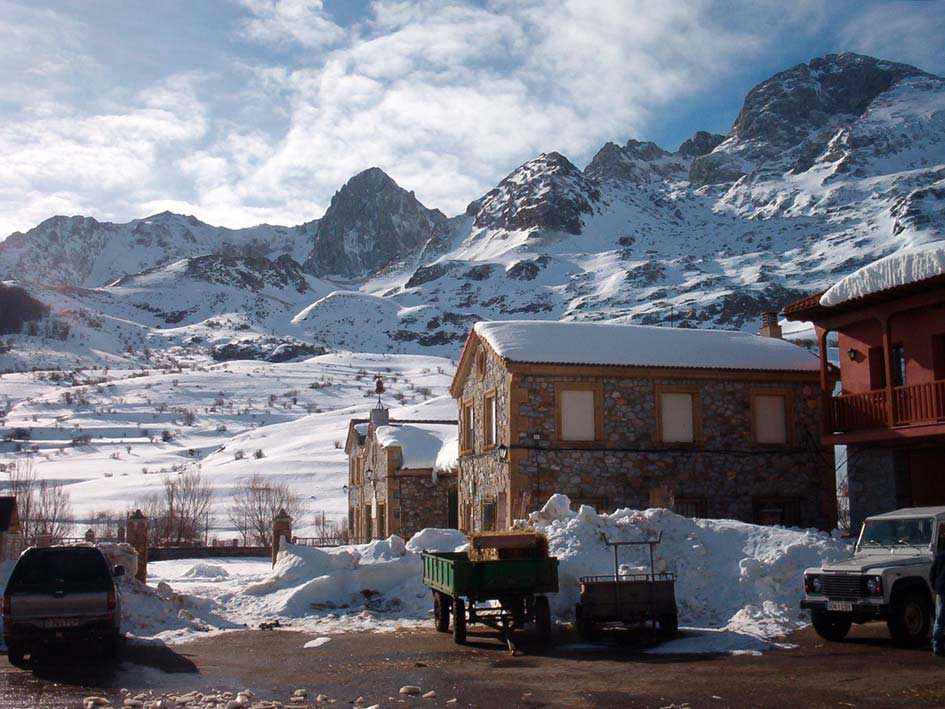

- Flag Coat of arms

- Location within Spain
- Coordinates: 43°2′56″N 5°10′37″W
- Country: Spain
- Autonomous community: Castile and León
- Province: León
- Municipality: Maraña

Government
  - Mayor: Ramoncín Maribor (PP)

Area
  - Total: 33.57 km^{2} (12.96 sq mi)
- Elevation: 1,238 m (4,062 ft)

Population (2025-01-01)
  - Total: 103
  - Density: 3.07/km^{2} (7.95/sq mi)
- Demonym(s): marañón, marañona; marañero, marañera
- Time zone: UTC+1 (CET)
  - Summer (DST): UTC+2 (CEST)
- Postal Code: 24996
- Telephone prefix: 987

Maraña (Spanish pronunciation: [maˈɾaɲa]) is a small village in Spain in the León, in the Picos de Europa, close to Asturias.

The major festival is August 15, the Festival of Our Lady of Riosol

== See also ==
- Kingdom of León
- Leonese language
