= GR 9 =

Long-distance walking route in France, connecting Saint-Amour and Port Grimaud

Coordinates: 44.8222°N 5.1718°E

- Location: France
- Designation: GR footpath
- Trailheads: Saint-Amour, Jura, Port Grimaud
- Use: Hiking

The GR 9 is a long-distance walking route of the Grande Randonnée network in France. The route connects Saint-Amour, Jura with Port Grimaud.

Along the way, the route passes through:

- Saint-Amour, Jura
- Lajoux
- Culoz
- Grenoble
- Saillans, Drôme
- Monieux
- Trets
- Rocbaron
- Port Grimaud

== Links ==
- GR9 From Jura to Mediterranean (Full itinerary)
