= GR 4 =

Long-distance footpath in France

Coordinates: 45.2611°N 2.7913°E

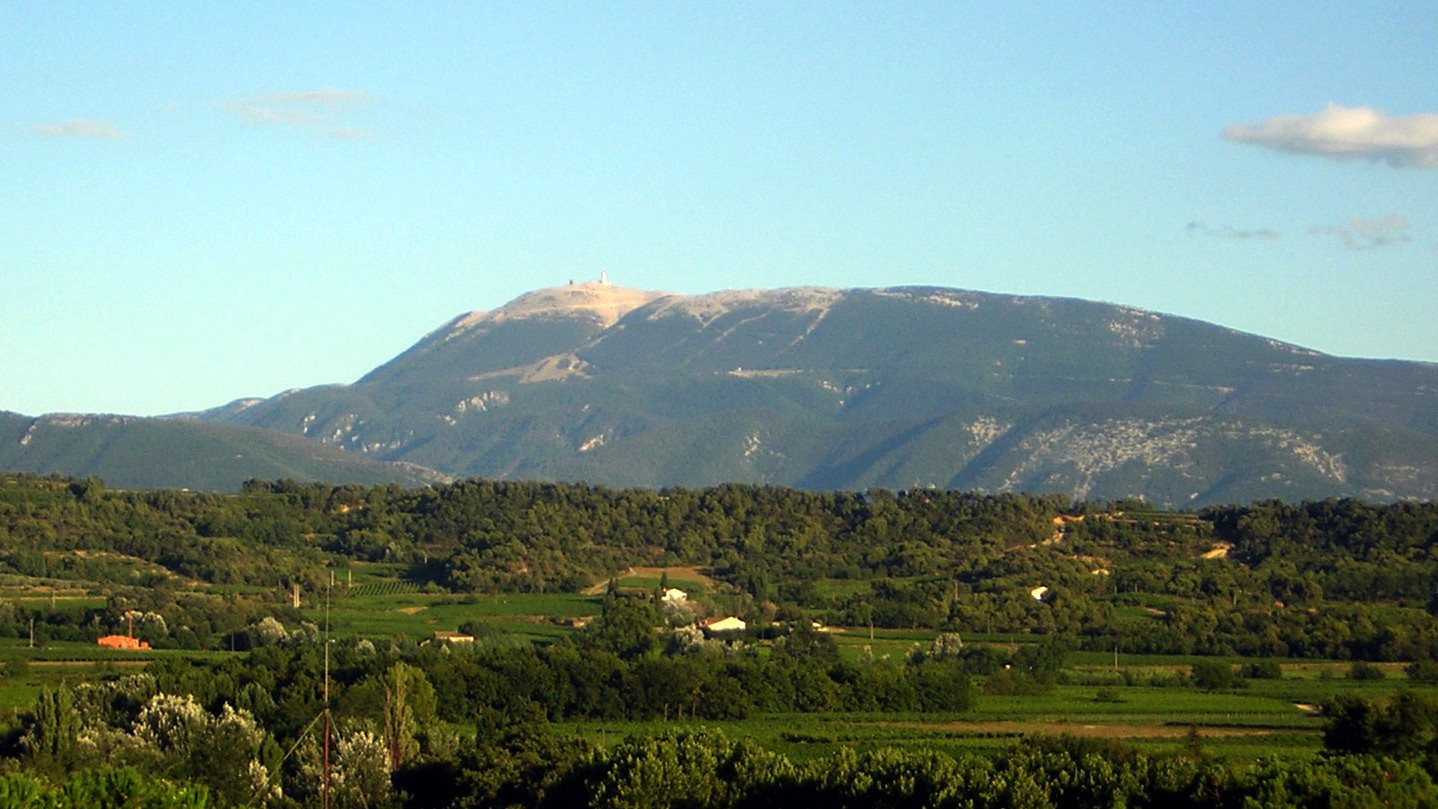
- A view of Mont Ventoux from Mirabel-aux-Baronnies.
- Location: France
- Designation: GR footpath
- Trailheads: Royan, Grasse
- Use: Hiking

The GR 4 is a long-distance walking route of the Grande Randonnée network in France. The route connects Royan with Grasse.

Along the way, the route passes through:

- Royan
- Saintes
- Montbron
- Aixe-sur-Vienne
- Aubusson
- Mont-Dore
- Les Vans
- Manosque
- Grasse
