= Saint-Étienne-de-Lugdarès =

- Commune
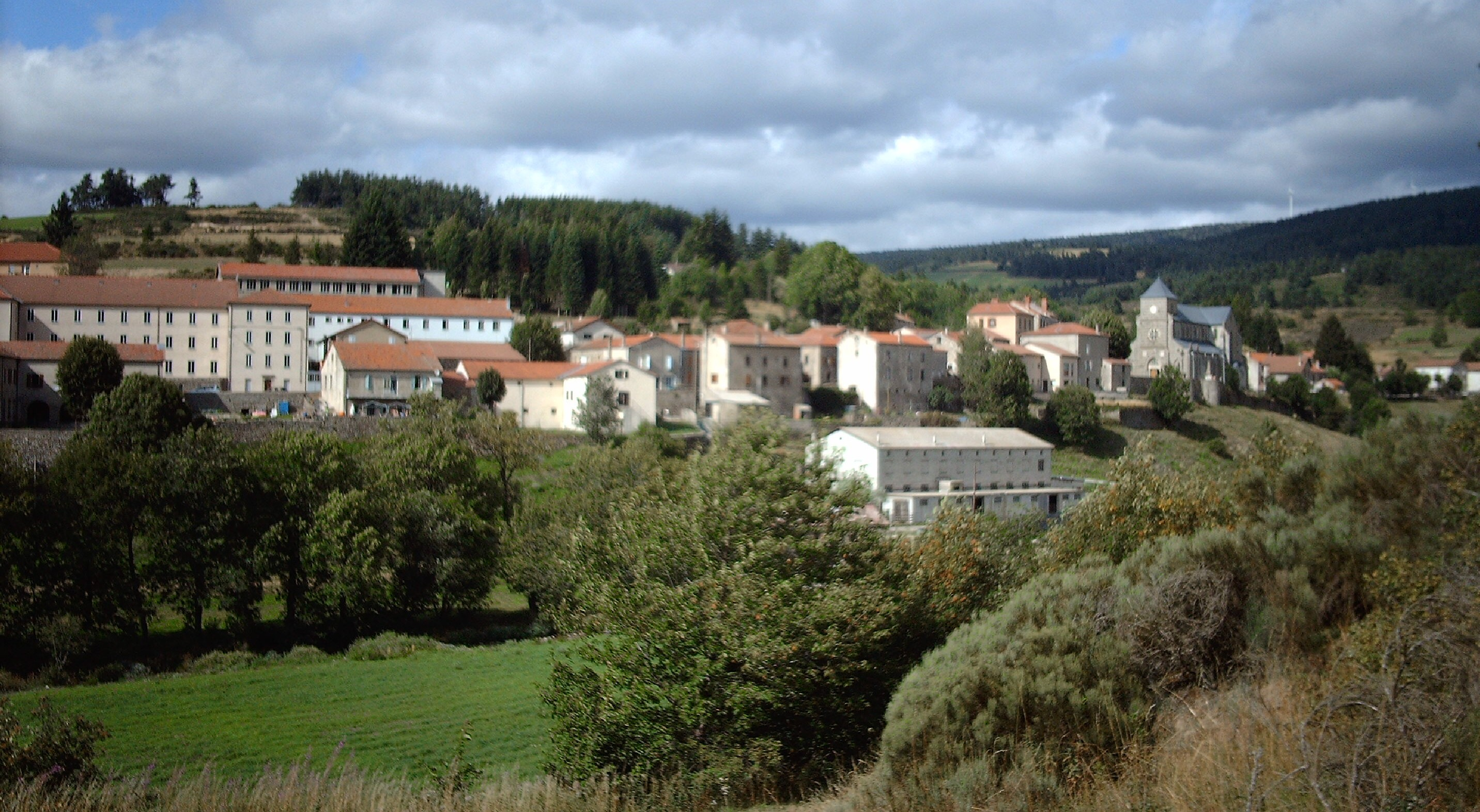
- A general view of Saint-Étienne-de-Lugdarès

- Coat of arms
- Location of Saint-Étienne-de-Lugdarès
- Location within France Location within Auvergne-Rhône-Alpes
- Coordinates: 44°39′09″N 3°57′23″E
- Country: France
- Region: Auvergne-Rhône-Alpes
- Department: Ardèche
- Arrondissement: Largentière
- Canton: Haute-Ardèche

Government
  - Mayor (2020–2026): Françoise Benoit
- Area^{1}: 50.34 km^{2} (19.44 sq mi)
- Elevation: 1,033 m (3,389 ft)
- Highest elevation: 1,485 m (4,872 ft)
- Lowest elevation: 969 m (3,179 ft)
- Population (2023): 406
  - Density: 8.07/km^{2} (20.9/sq mi)
- Time zone: UTC+01:00 (CET)
  - Summer (DST): UTC+02:00 (CEST)
- INSEE/Postal code: 07232 /07590
- ^{1} French Land Register data, which excludes lakes, ponds, glaciers > 1 km^{2} (0.386 sq mi or 247 acres) and river estuaries.

Saint-Étienne-de-Lugdarès (French pronunciation: [sɛ̃.t‿etjɛn də lyɡdaʁɛs]; Auvergnat: Sant Estève de Ludarés) is a commune in the Ardèche department in southern France.

== Population ==
Historical population
Year	Pop.	±% p.a.
1968	579	—
1975	476	−2.76%
1982	422	−1.71%
1990	436	+0.41%
1999	458	+0.55%
2007	452	−0.16%
2012	400	−2.41%
2017	419	+0.93%
2023	406	−0.52%
Source: INSEE

== See also ==
- Communes of the Ardèche department
