= GR 1 =

Footpath in France

- Location: Île-de-France, France
- Designation: Grande Randonnée (GR)
- Trailheads: Porte Maillot (Paris) – Feucherolles
- Use: Hiking
- Season: Year-round
- Sights: Bois de Boulogne, Forests around Paris

The long distance footpath GR 1 is one of the paths in the grand randonnée network in France. It takes in the great forests outside Paris.

== Course ==
=== Porte Maillot ===
The starting point is the Porte Maillot metro station.

=== Bois de Boulogne to Forêt de Marly ===
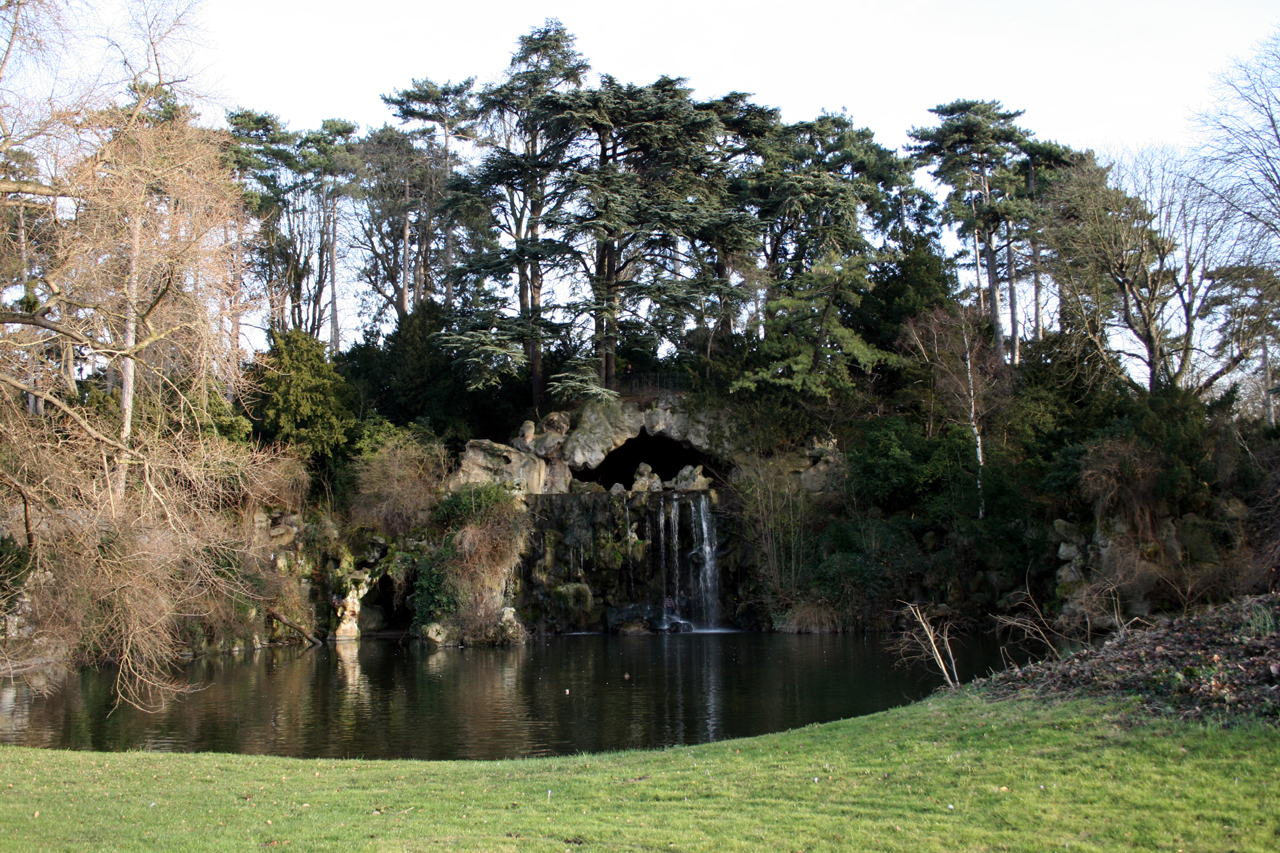
The Grande Cascade in the Bois de Boulogne

The path crosses the bois de Boulogne, goes around the hippodrome de Longchamp, crosses the Seine by the Avre footbridge (built by Gustave Eiffel) and goes into Saint-Cloud.

It crosses the parc de Saint-Cloud and comes out at Marnes-la-Coquette.

It comes to Vaucresson, then La Celle-Saint-Cloud, the upper part of Louveciennes and the edge of the park of the former Château de Marly then enters the Marly Forest.

=== From Forêt de Marly to Forêt de Rambouillet ===
It goes through Feucherolles (where it will eventually terminate), the small village of Davron, Thiverval-Grignon and comes to Neauphle-le-Vieux zigzagging through the countryside via Saint-Germain-de-la-Grange.

It comes to Méré then Montfort-l'Amaury where it enters the Forest of Rambouillet.

It comes out of the forest at Gazeran to go through Rambouillet town, then back into the forest as far as Saint-Arnoult-en-Yvelines.

=== From Forêt de Rambouillet to Forêt de Fontainebleau ===
It then crosses the Forest of Saint-Arnoult to Dourdan and goes along the valley of the river Orge as far as Breuillet.

It crosses the wood of Baville de Saint-Yon to Boissy-sous-Saint-Yon going through Saint-Sulpice-de-Favières, then Torfou and Lardy.

Then it goes into the parc naturel régional of the French Gâtinais, through Janville-sur-Juine, Boissy-le-Cutté, D'Huison-Longueville, Vayres-sur-Essonne, Boutigny-sur-Essonne, Buno-Bonnevaux, turns off towards Malesherbes following the valley of the river Essonne, then goes through the Forest of Fontainebleau from Le Vaudoué to Melun.

=== From Forêt de Fontainebleau to Forêt de Crécy ===
It passes in front of the Château de Vaux-le-Vicomte, then goes to Blandy, Champeaux, Andrezel, Verneuil-l'Étang, Chaumes-en-Brie, Fontenay-Trésigny, Marles-en-Brie, La Houssaye-en-Brie and crosses the Forest of Crécy up to Crécy-la-Chapelle.

It goes through Bouleurs and Nanteuil-lès-Meaux, arriving at the river Marne at Meaux.

=== From Forêt de Crécy to Feucherolles ===
The GR 1 completes its circuit at Feucherolles.
