= Villamor =

Villamor is a surname. Notable people with the surname include:

- Ala Villamor (born 1970), Filipino boxer
- Antonio Villamor (born 1931), Filipino basketball player
- Dennice Villamor (born 1990), Filipino basketball player
- Ignacio Villamor (1863–1933), Filipino lawyer and Supreme Court associate justice
- Irene Emma Villamor, Filipino independent filmmaker-producer, television director, and scripwriter
- Jesús A. Villamor (1914–1971), Filipino-American pilot, spy, and Medal of Valor awardee
- Juan Villamor (1864–?), Filipino writer, revolutionary, and politician

== See also ==
- Villamor Air Base
