= GR 36 =

Walking trail in France

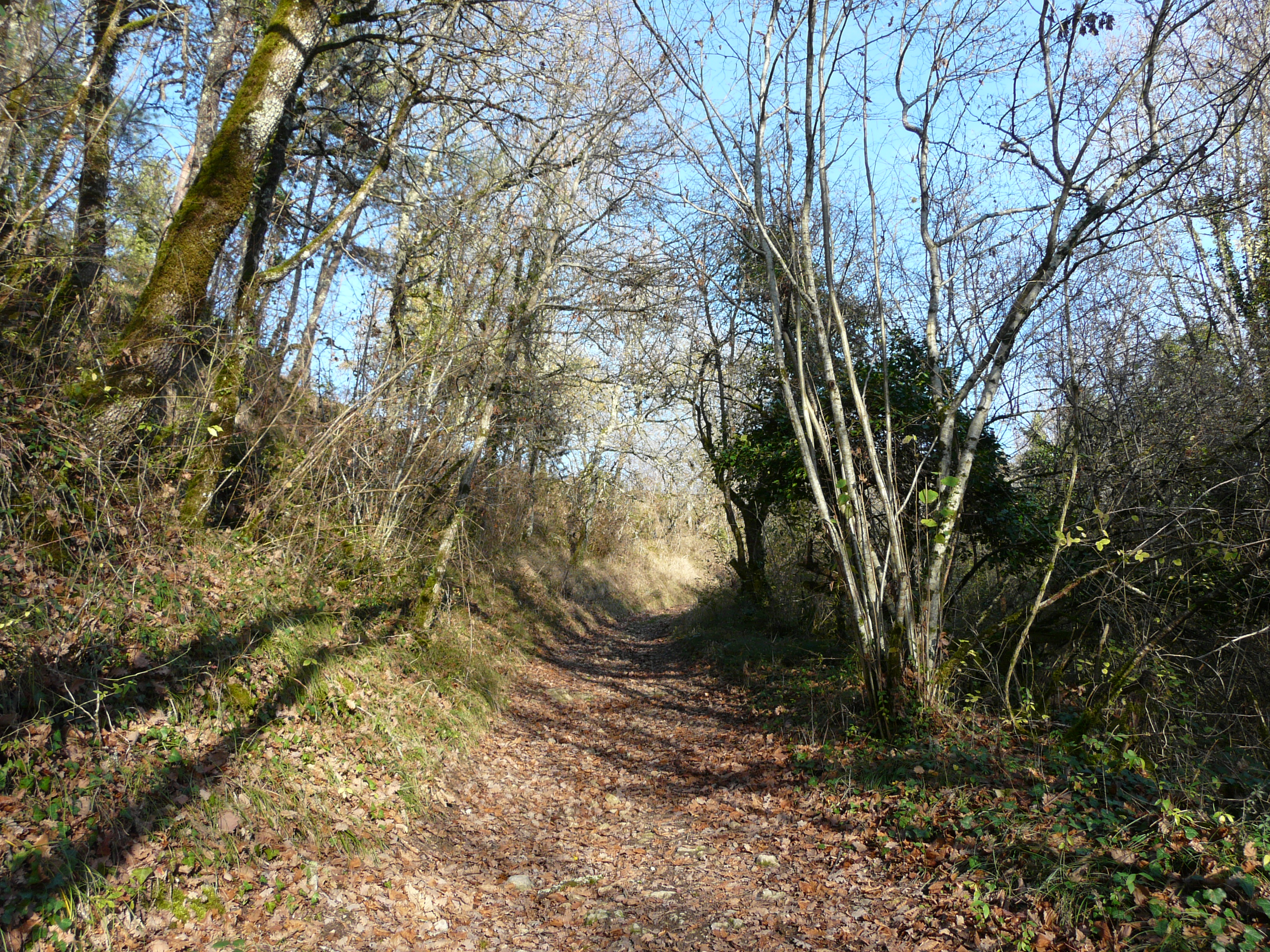
- GR 36 near Fanlac, Dordogne, France.
- Length: 1,916 km (1,191 mi)
- Location: France
- Designation: GR footpath
- Trailheads: Ouistreham, Bourg-Madame
- Use: Hiking

The GR 36 is a long-distance walking route of the Grande Randonnée network in France. The route connects Ouistreham, on the Normandy coast of the English Channel, with Bourg-Madame, on the Pyrenees border with Spain.

Along the way, the route passes through:

- Ouistreham
- Caen
- Le Mans
- Saumur
- Thouars
- Parthenay
- Niort
- Angoulême
- Périgueux
- Cahors
- Albi
- Carcassonne
- Bourg-Madame
