= Barre-des-Cévennes =

Commune in Lozère, France

- Commune
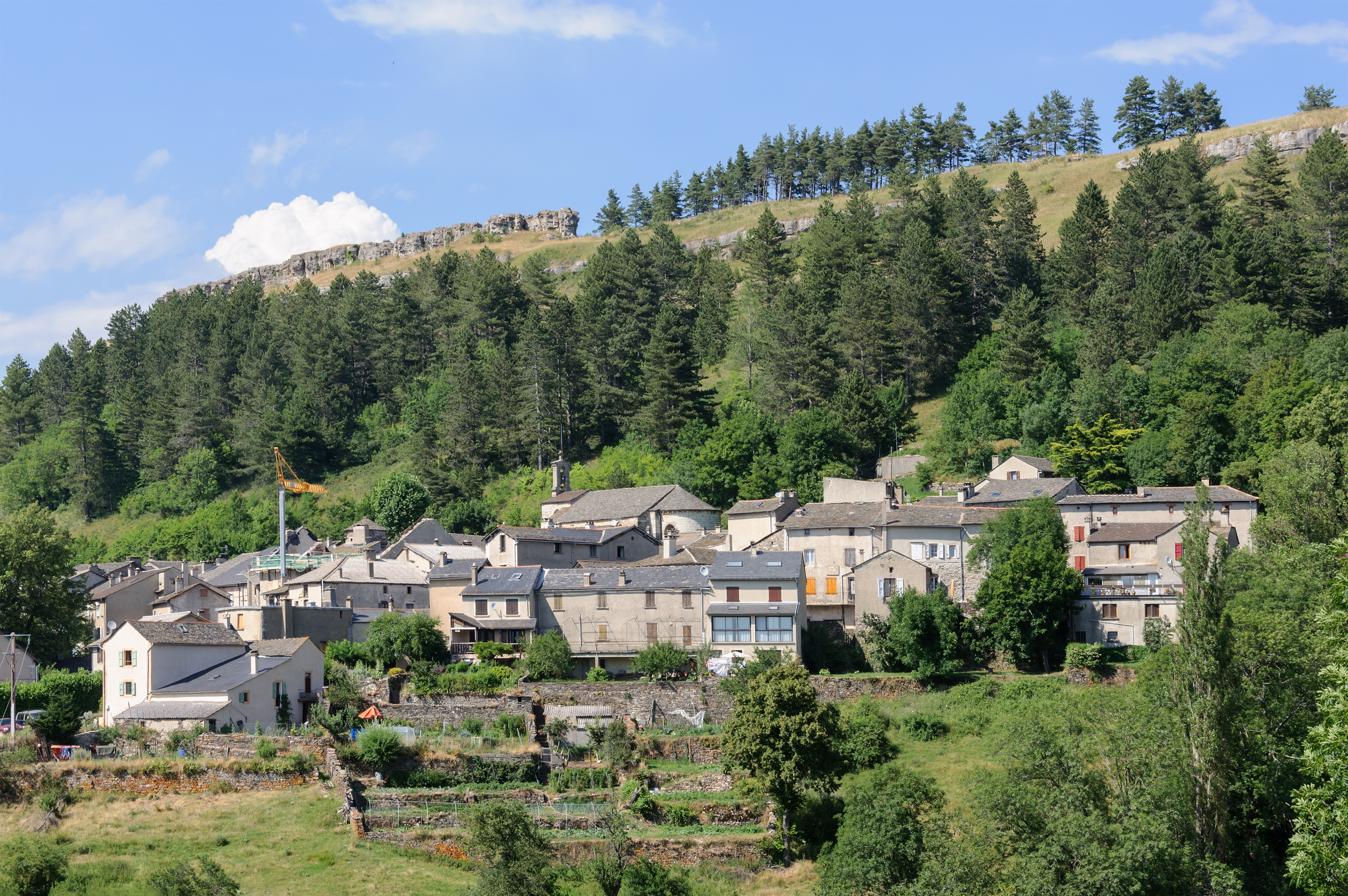
- A general view of Barre-des-Cévennes

- Coat of arms
- Location of Barre-des-Cévennes
- Location within France Location within Occitanie
- Coordinates: 44°14′44″N 3°39′15″E
- Country: France
- Region: Occitania
- Department: Lozère
- Arrondissement: Florac
- Canton: Le Collet-de-Dèze
- Intercommunality: CC Gorges Causses Cévennes

Government
  - Mayor (2020–2026): François Rouveyrol
- Area^{1}: 34.29 km^{2} (13.24 sq mi)
- Elevation: 930 m (3,050 ft)
- Highest elevation: 1,064 m (3,491 ft)
- Lowest elevation: 500 m (1,600 ft)
- Population (2023): 200
  - Density: 5.8/km^{2} (15/sq mi)
- Time zone: UTC+01:00 (CET)
  - Summer (DST): UTC+02:00 (CEST)
- INSEE/Postal code: 48019 /48400
- ^{1} French Land Register data, which excludes lakes, ponds, glaciers > 1 km^{2} (0.386 sq mi or 247 acres) and river estuaries.

Barre-des-Cévennes (French pronunciation: [baʁ de sevɛn], literally Barre of the Cévennes; Occitan: Barra de las Cevenas) is a commune in the Lozère department in southern France.

== Population ==
Historical population
Year	Pop.	±% p.a.
1968	201	—
1975	152	−3.91%
1982	214	+5.01%
1990	187	−1.67%
1999	180	−0.42%
2007	207	+1.76%
2012	206	−0.10%
2017	202	−0.39%
2023	200	−0.17%
Source: INSEE

== See also ==
- Communes of the Lozère department
