= Villefort, Lozère =

Villefort
- Commune
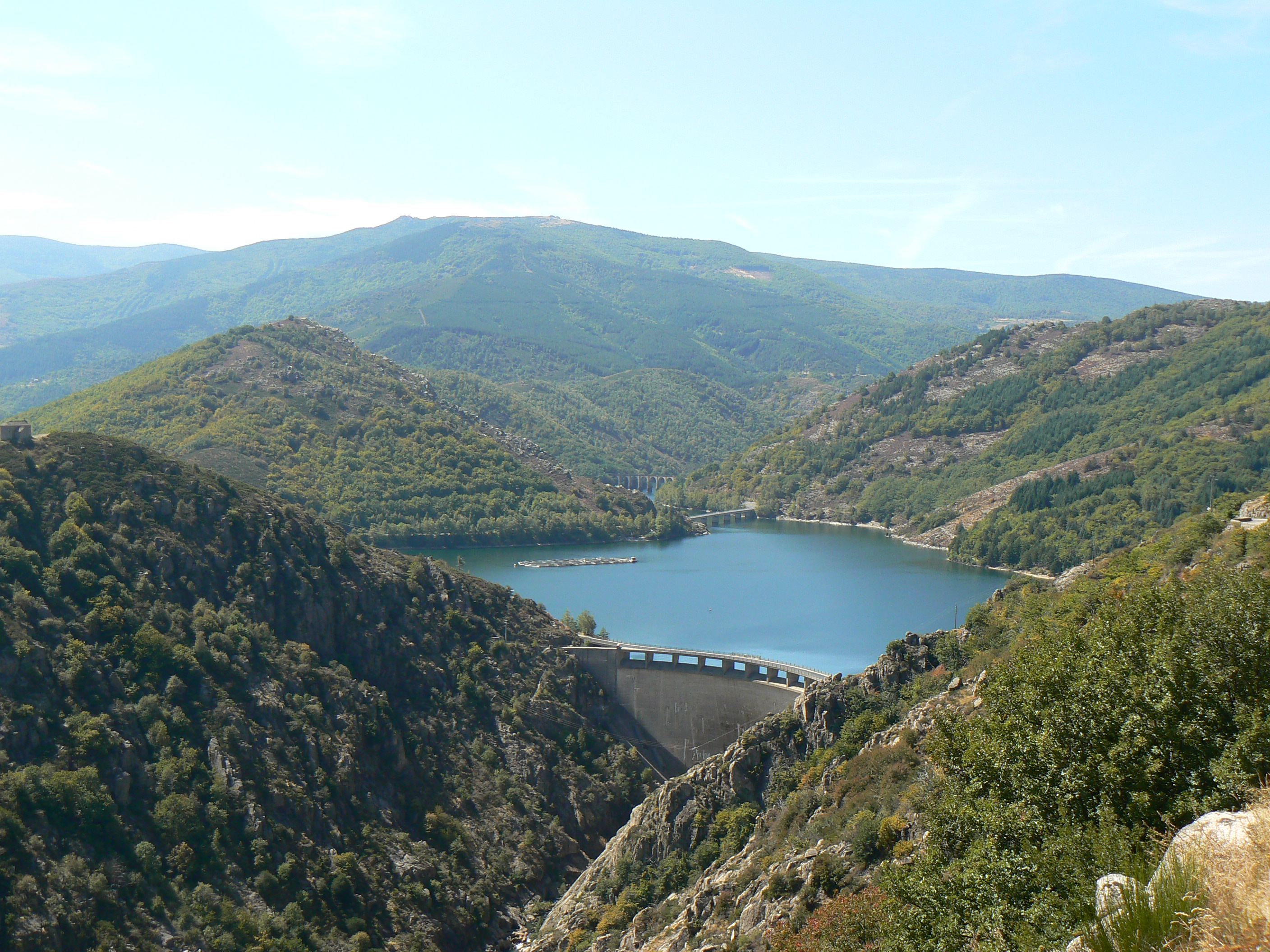
- Dam and lake of Villefort

- Coat of arms
- Location of Villefort
- Location within France Location within Occitanie
- Coordinates: 44°26′25″N 3°55′58″E
- Country: France
- Region: Occitania
- Department: Lozère
- Arrondissement: Mende
- Canton: Saint-Étienne-du-Valdonnez
- Intercommunality: CC Mont Lozère

Government
  - Mayor (2022–2026): Jean-Claude Bajac-Leyantou
- Area^{1}: 7.35 km^{2} (2.84 sq mi)
- Elevation: 605 m (1,985 ft)
- Highest elevation: 960 m (3,150 ft)
- Lowest elevation: 509 m (1,670 ft)
- Population (2023): 618
  - Density: 84.1/km^{2} (218/sq mi)
- Time zone: UTC+01:00 (CET)
  - Summer (DST): UTC+02:00 (CEST)
- INSEE/Postal code: 48198 /48800
- ^{1} French Land Register data, which excludes lakes, ponds, glaciers > 1 km^{2} (0.386 sq mi or 247 acres) and river estuaries.

Villefort (French pronunciation: [vilfɔʁ]; Occitan: Vilafòrt) is a commune in the Lozère department in southern France.

== People ==
Villefort was the birthplace of Odilon Barrot (1791–1873), politician and Prime Minister of France.

== See also ==
- Communes of the Lozère department
