= E9 European long distance path =

Walking path

E9
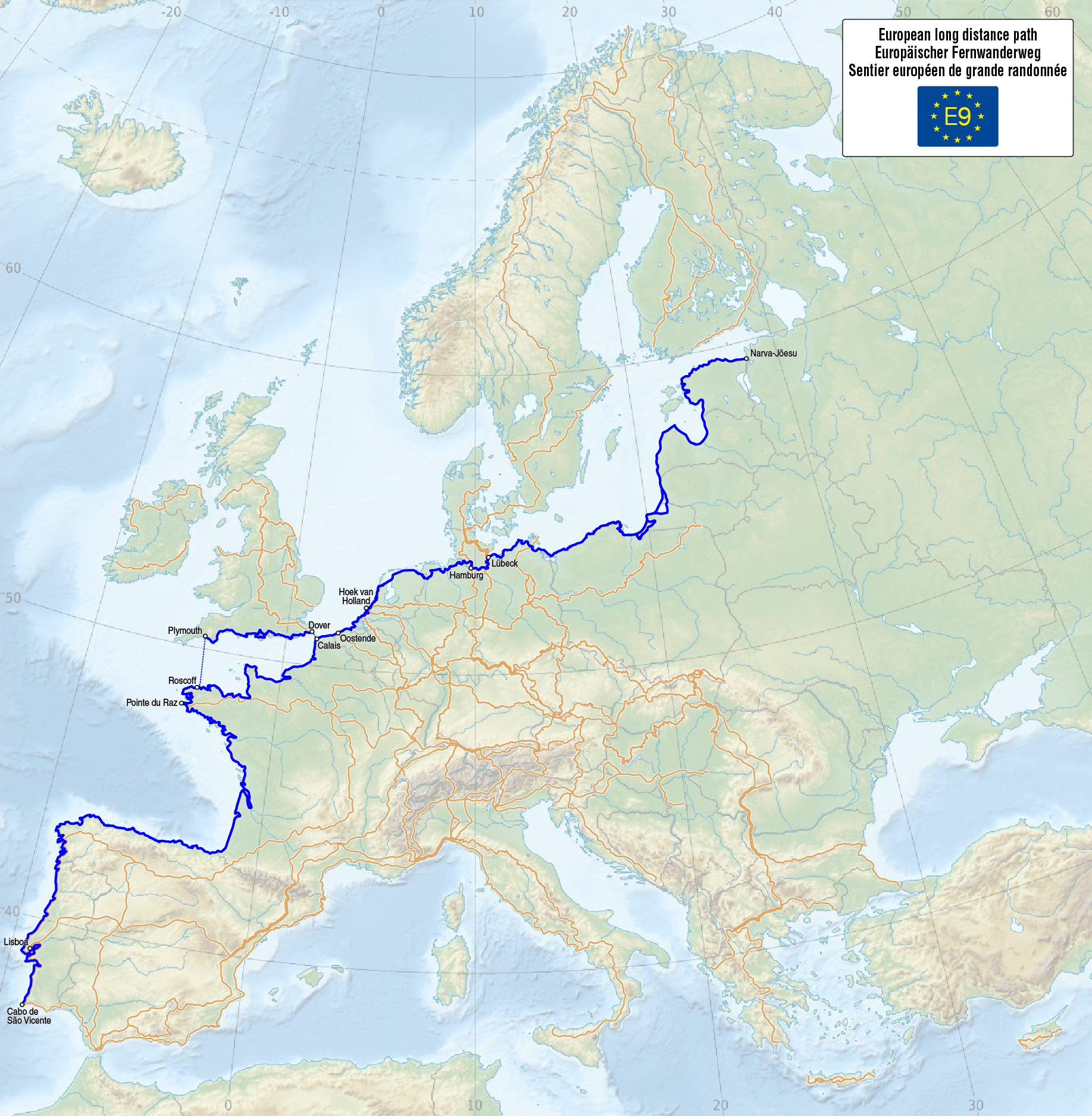
- Length: 9,880 km (6,140 mi)
- Trailheads: Cabo de São Vicente, Narva-Jõesuu
- Use: Hiking

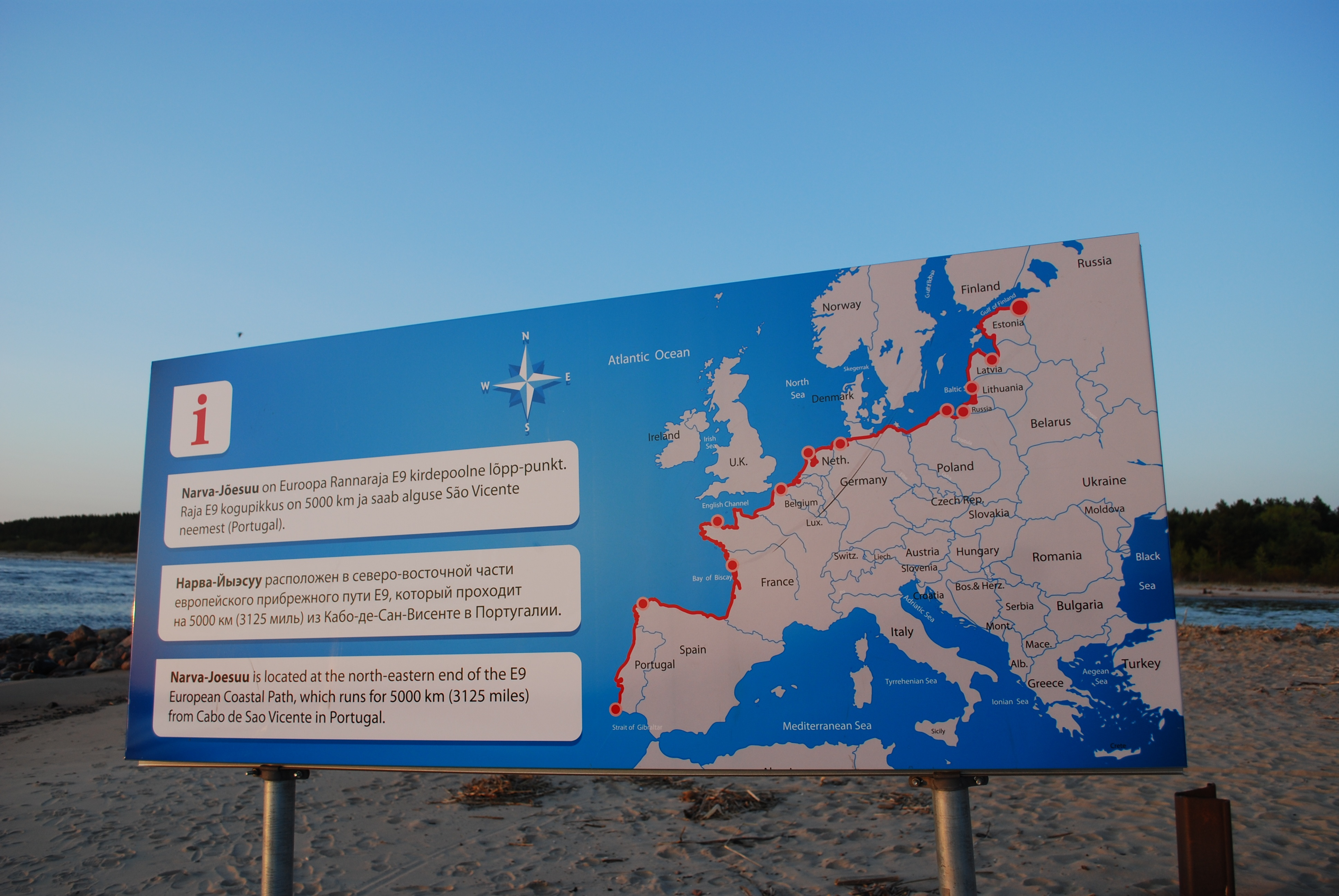
The eastern end of the route in Narva-Jõesuu, Estonia.

The E9 European long distance path, E9 path or European Coastal Path (French: Sentier européen du Littoral) is one of the twelve European long-distance paths, running for 9880 km from Tarifa, Spain to Narva-Jõesuu in Estonia. In 2019, the southern terminus was extended from Cabo de São Vicente in Portugal to Tarifa in Spain, the southern-most point of continental Europe, and also the starting point of E4 and E12.

== Portugal ==
The path follows the western coasts of Portugal from Cabo de São Vicente and is known in Portuguese as Caminho do Atlântico or Trelho Europeu de Grande Rota 11-E9. There are also some sections around Lisbon and it's possible that the Camino Portuguese Coastal Way could also become part of the E9.

== Spain ==
The path, known in Spanish as Camino Costero europeo or Sendero Europeo E-9, follows the western coasts of Spain. often including the GR footpaths in Spain.

== France ==
The path follows the northern and western coasts of France starting at Bray-Dunes on the Belgian border. The GR 120 runs from Dunkerque to Pas d'Authie, the GR 21 from Le Tréport to Le Havre, GR 223 from Le Havre via Cherbourg to Avranches where it divides into several smaller local trails. The GR 34 then continues from Mont St-Michel to Le Tour-du-Parc. The GR 8 re-starts the trail further south from Saint-Brevin-les-Pins to Sare in the Pyrenees incorporating a short coastal section of the GR 4.

== England ==
The path follows the southern coast to Plymouth in England, continuing on the English south coast as far as Dover, where another ferry crossing returns the route to Calais in France. In England the path follows parts of the South West Coast Path, the Solent Way, the South Downs Way and the Saxon Shore Way paths. The British route itself includes an alternative route via the Isle of Wight.

== Belgium ==
The path then follows the coast of Belgium.

== Netherlands ==
The path follows the coast of the Netherlands. Here it follows the Dutch North Sea Trail, which includes 5 successive trails:

- from Sluis (border with Belgium) to Hook of Holland
- Hook of Holland to Haarlem
- Haarlem to Den Oever (there is an alternative route to Den Helder, but the European route continues along the Afsluitdijk)
- Zurich to Lauwersoog
- Lauwersoog to Bad Nieuweschans (the border with Germany).

== Germany ==
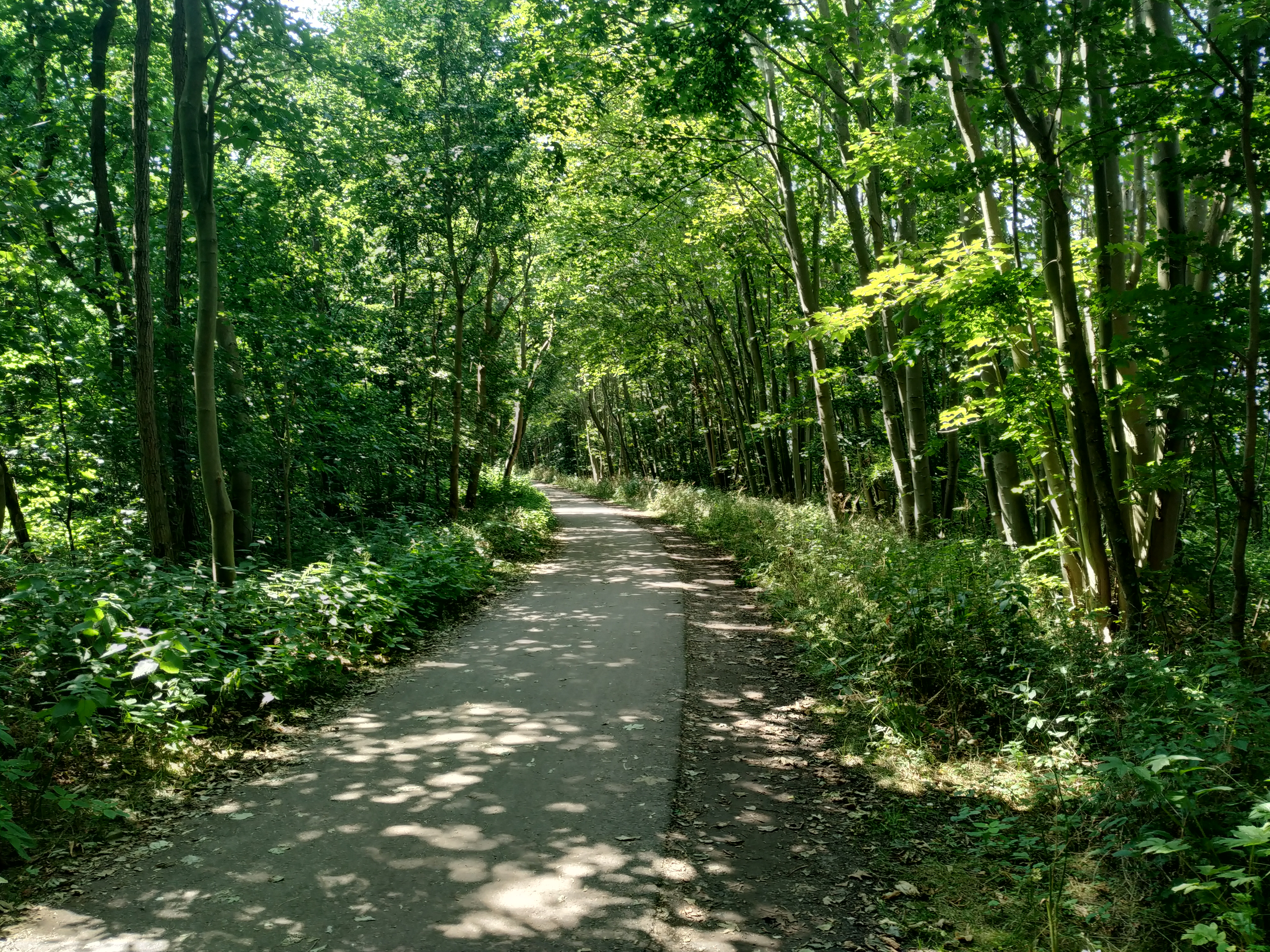
Section in the coastal forest in Rostock

The path crosses the base of the Jutland peninsula, before following the coast of the Baltic Sea.

== Poland ==
- Szlak Nadmorski (Coastal Trail): Świnoujście – Żarnowiec
- Żarnowiec – Braniewo.

== Lithuania ==
The E9 route follows the Baltic Coastal Hike through Lithuania, Latvia and Estonia. In Lithuania, the trail is known as Jūrų takas and is 216 km long. The route through Lithuania takes about 10–12 days to walk and is divided into stages of about 20 km each. The highest point of the trail in Lithuania is Curonian Spit. Other highlights along the route are the Nemunas Delta, Seaside regional parks, and the coastal resorts of Nida and Palanga. The trail is marked with white-blue-white signs on stones, trees, and other natural objects. See more here

== Latvia ==
In Latvia, the trail is known as Jūrtaka and is 581 km long. This part of the E9 route takes about 30 days to walk and is divided into stages of about 20 km. Highlights along the route are the Slitere National Park, Kemeri National Park, and the coastal resort Jurmala. The trail is marked with white-blue-white signs on stones, trees, and other natural objects. See more here.

== Estonia ==
In Estonia, the trail is known as Ranniku matkarada and is 622 km long. It takes about 30 days to complete and is divided into stages of about 20 km. The highest point of the trail in Estonia is the Rannamõisa cliff. Other highlights along the route are Matsalu National Park, the coastal resorts of Pärnu and Haapsalu, and the Western Estonian islands. The trail is marked with white-blue-white signs on stones, trees, and other natural objects. See more here and at the External links below.
