= E12 =

E12 or E-12 may refer to:

== Science, technology and mathematics ==
- the E12 series of preferred numbers
- E12 screw, a type of Edison screw
- the code name for Microsoft Exchange Server 2007
- Siding Spring Survey code

== Transport ==
=== Roads and trails ===
- European route E12
- E12 European long distance path
- Ampang–Kuala Lumpur Elevated Highway (AKLEH), a fully elevated expressway in Kuala Lumpur, Malaysia

=== Vehicles ===
- BMW E12
- HMS E12, a United Kingdom Royal Navy submarine which saw service during World War I
- Spyker E12, a Dutch Spyker car

== Other uses ==
- Queen's Indian Defense, Encyclopaedia of Chess Openings code
- E12, a postcode district in the E postcode area
- E-12 equal temperament consisting of twelve equal semitones per octave

== See also ==
- 12E (disambiguation)
