= 12E =

12E may refer to:

== Places ==
- Road 12E, see List of highways numbered 12E
- Tram 12e, a tramline in Lison; see Trams in Lisbon
- 12e arrondissement (disambiguation)

== Transportation ==
- Hiller 12E, a helicopter
- Lorraine 12E Courlis, an aero engine
- South African Class 12E, an electric locomotive

== Other uses ==
- 12e Régiment blindé du Canada
- 12e Régiment de Cuirassiers de France

== See also ==
- 12 (disambiguation)
- E12 (disambiguation)
- l2E (disambiguation)
