= Saint-Philibert disaster =

1931 ship capsizing off the French coast

St. Philibert
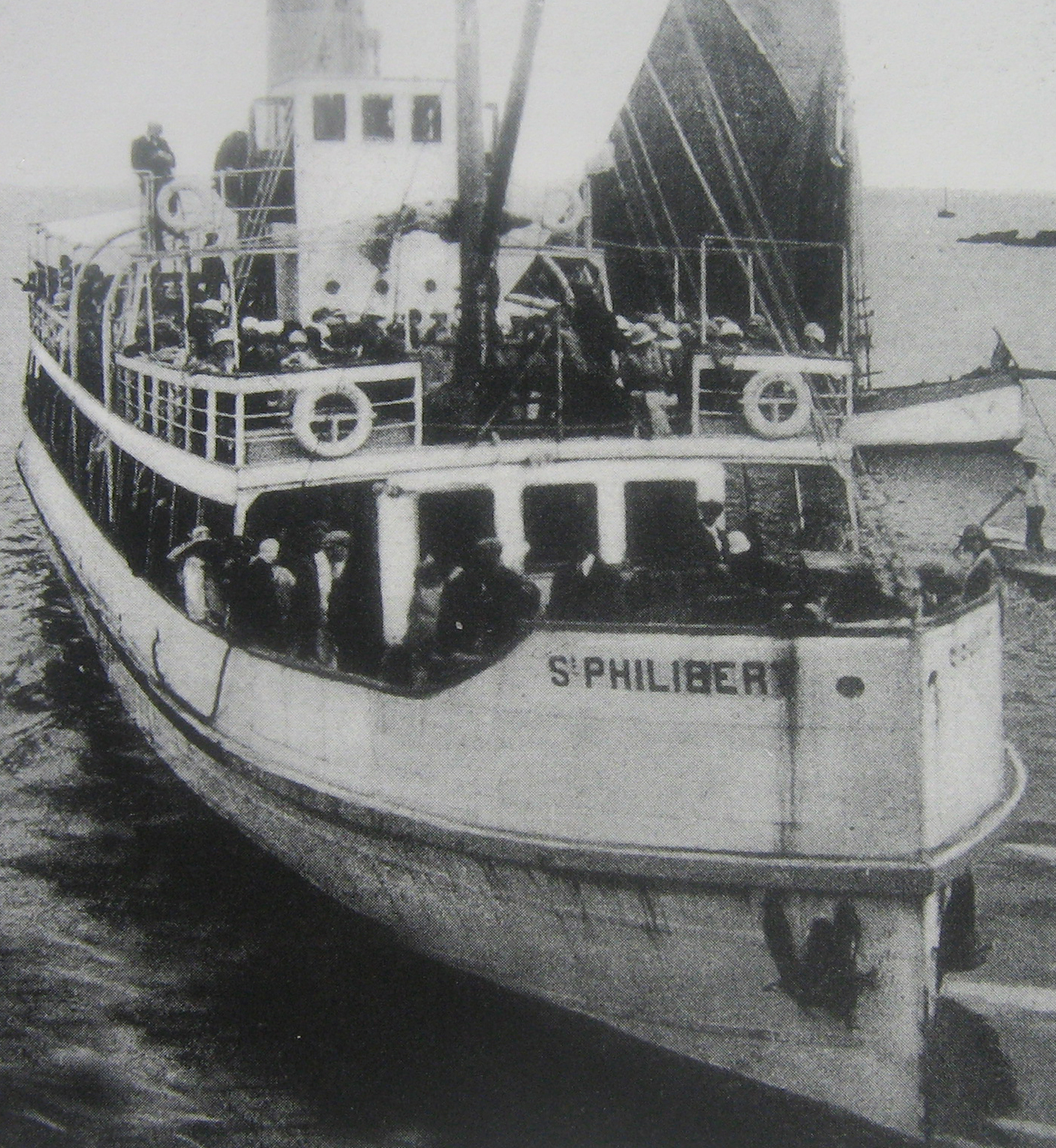
- Saint Philibert

History

France
- Fate: Capsized and sank 14 June 1931

General characteristics
- Type: Cruise ship

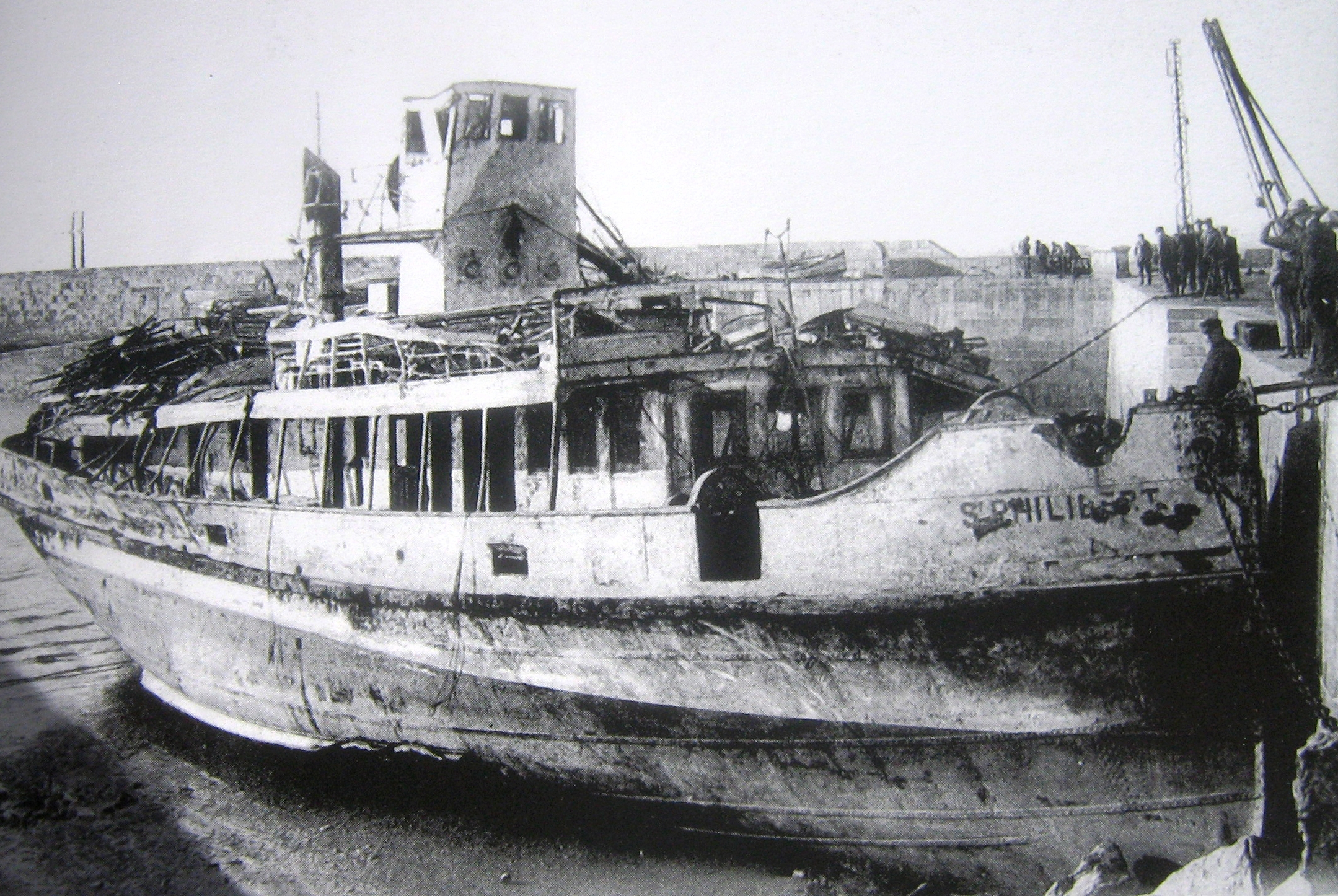
Saint Philibert

St. Philibert was a small cruise ship sailing in the summer from the mouth of the Loire River and near the coast of France. On 14 June 1931, nearly 500 people, mostly workers and their families from Nantes, embarked in the port of Nantes. 467 passengers were checked in, in addition to an unknown number of children accompanying their parents. Seven men from the crew, supervised by Captain Ollive, were responsible for ensuring smooth passage for the ship. The outbound trip was normal and St. Philibert docked at the L'Herbaudière on the Île de Noirmoutier.

On the return trip, the weather deteriorated later in the afternoon and St. Philibert faced raging seas. The storm, of unknown force, made navigation very difficult. The ship was not prepared for bad weather. In addition, it had onboard twice the expected load. Passengers stood at the starboard, which made the ship heel dangerously and with a wave stronger than the others, the ship capsized and sank almost immediately off Pointe Saint-Gildas, across the Loire from Saint-Nazaire. Only 7 survivors were pulled from the water, but up to 100 may have disembarked at Noirmoutiers or Pornic. The death toll was ultimately reported as 503.

A trial took place in 1933 and the victims' families were unsuccessful and the owners were free from any responsibility in the disaster.
