= GR 8 =

GR 8 may refer to:

- GR 8 (galaxy), a dwarf irregular galaxy
- GR 8 (path), a hiking trail

== See also ==
- GR8 and Gr8, an abbreviation of "great" in SMS language
