= E10 =

E10, E 10 or E-10 may refer to:

- E10 fuel, see Common ethanol fuel mixtures#E10 or less, a mixture of 10% ethanol and 90% petrol
- Diabetes mellitus type 1 ICD-10 code
- Entertainment Software Rating Board: E10+, the symbol for Everyone 10+, indicating material that may not be suitable for those under 10
- E10 screw, a type of Edison screw
- Olympus E-10, a single-lens reflex camera digital camera from 2000
- Queen's Pawn Game, Encyclopaedia of Chess Openings code
- The 10 elected members of the United Nations Security Council
- E_{10} (Lie algebra), a mathematical structure

== Routing ==
- E10 European long distance path
- E10, a postcode district in the E postcode area of east London
- European route E10
- London Buses route E10
- Higashikyushu Expressway (between Kitakyushu JCT and Kiyotake JCT) and Miyazaki Expressway, route E10 in Japan
- New Pantai Expressway, route E10 in Malaysia

== Vehicles ==
- Chevy E10, an electric vehicle
- DB Class E 10, a 1952 German electric locomotive
- E 10, an experimental German light tank destroyer of World War II, part of the Entwicklung series
- E-10 MC2A, a Northrop Grumman military aircraft based on the Boeing 767-400ER airframe
- JNR Class E10, a class of Japanese steam locomotive
- LSWR E10 class, a British LSWR Locomotive
- SJ E10, a class of Swedish steam locomotives
- Toyota Corolla (E10), a car
- Zenos E10, a sports car
- E10 Series Shinkansen, a Japanese high-speed train
- Yutong E10, a battery electric bus
