= GR7 =

GR7 can be:

- The GR 7 long-distance footpath in Spain, Andorra and France
- A version of the RAF Harrier II military aeroplane
