= GR 7 =

Walking path

Coordinates: 40°43′44″N 0°11′39″E

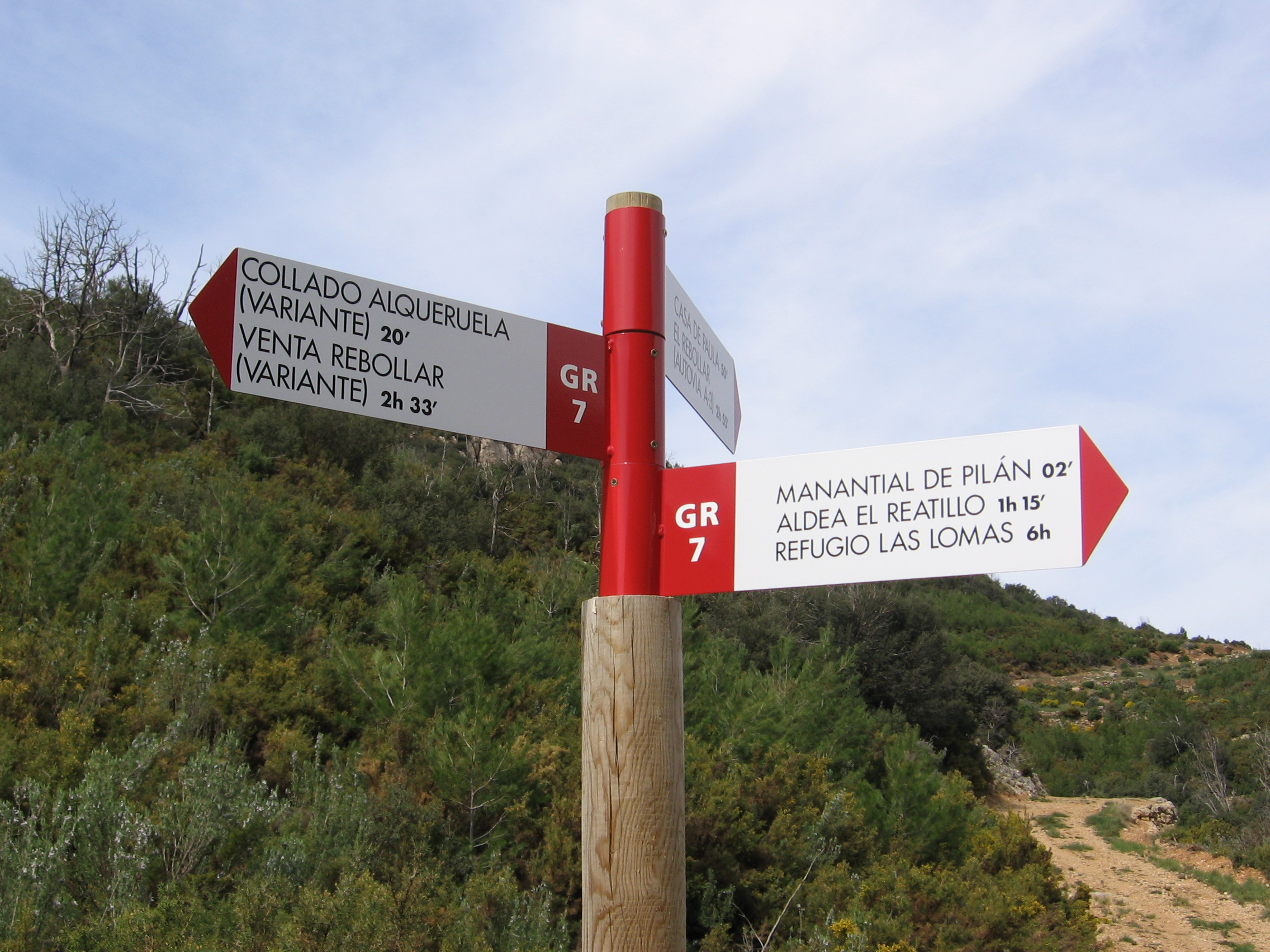

The GR 7 is a long-distance footpath in Spain, Andorra and France. One of the GR footpaths, it is part of both the Spanish network of Senderos de Gran Recorrido and the French network of Sentiers de Grandes Randonnées. Part of GR 7 forms the south-westernmost part of the European walking route E4 in Spain. GR 7 runs from Tarifa, near Gibraltar, across Spain, through France into Andorra, and back into France to Mont Aigoual and Aire-de-Côte in the Cévennes. GR 7 continues north from the Cévennes mountains and the final 250 km end on the top of the Ballon d'Alsace, Alsace, northern France; here it meets E5.

== Spain ==
The Spanish GR 7 is 1900 km long. It was the first long-distance footpath to be marked out in Spain, and was initiated in 1974. It runs up the east side of peninsular Spain, but at some distance from the coast. From south-west to north-east, it runs through the Spanish regions of:

- Andalucía, from Tarifa to Puebla de Don Fadrique
- Murcia, from Cañada de la Cruz to Torre del Rico
- Valencia, from Pinoso to Fredes
- Catalonia, from Fredes to Andorra

Like all the Gran Recorrido paths, the GR 7 is marked with red and white waymarks. These waymarks, at least on some segments of the trail, are few and faded.

There is a choice of two routes around the Spanish Sierra Nevada, one to the north of the mountains, and one to the south below. The Southern Route through the Alpujarra foothills is popular, linking numerous small Spanish villages.

== France and Andorra ==
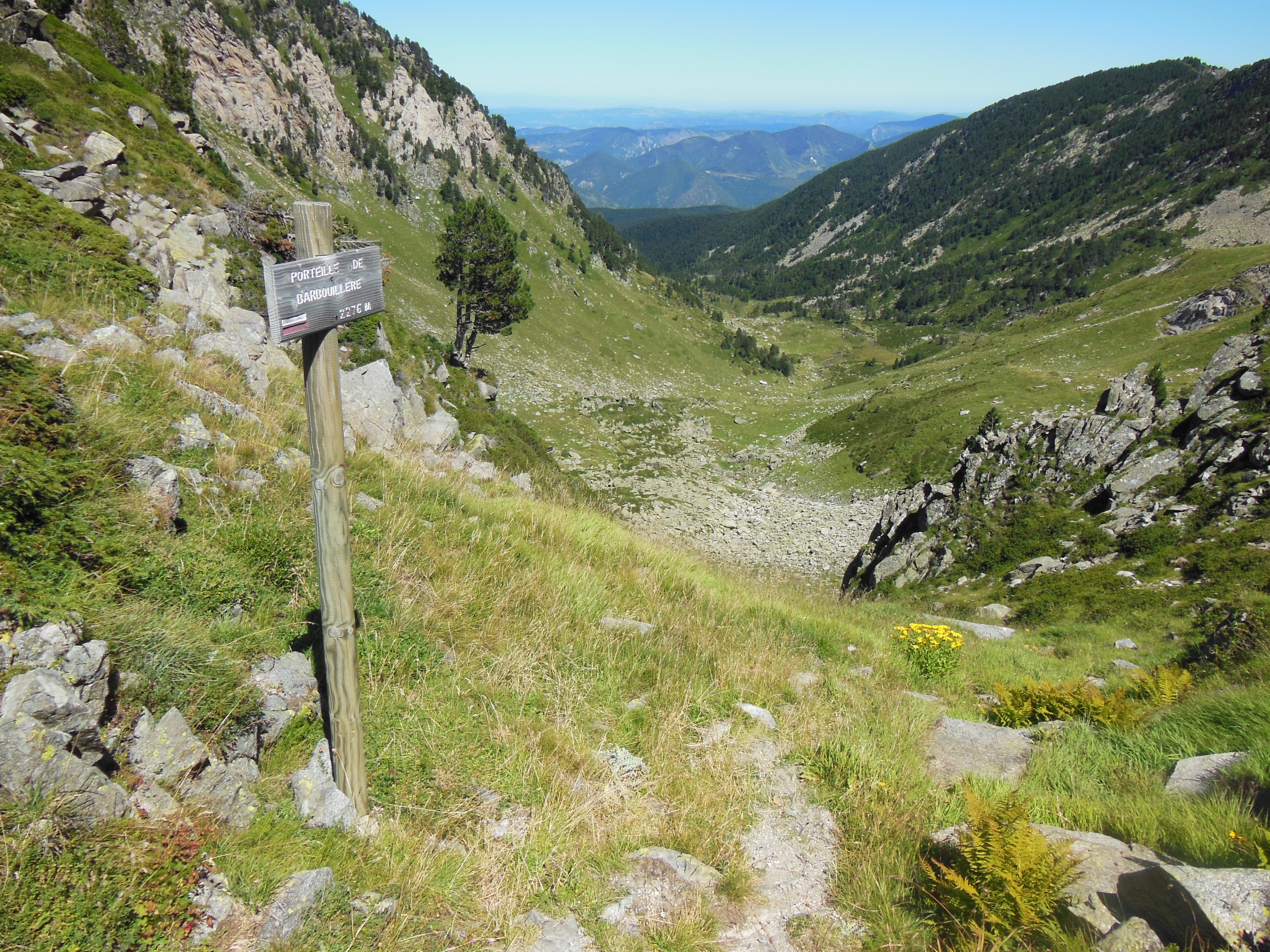
The GR 7 at Porteille de Barbouillère, Ariège, France.

The French part of GR 7 is 1400 km long. From Andorra, the GR 7 continues in France, through the Cevennes to Mont Aigoual and Aire-de-Côte, and then north to Alsace.

== E 7 path ==
GR 7 appears to coincide with European walking route E7 in northern Spain, in Andorra, and in France as far as the Cevenne. From the Cevenne the European walking route E7 continues south along Gr 6, through the South of France, Italy, Slovenia, and Hungary. It will eventually end in Romania, so as to create a route that will reach from the Atlantic (Lisbon, Portugal) to the Black Sea; however, some stages, including parts of the route through Italy, are still in planning.

== Bibliography ==
Shirra, Kirstie, Lowe, Michelle. Walking the GR7 in Andalucia. Millnthorpe, Cumbria: Cicerone, 2010.

== Links ==
- Path in Spain: http://www.rutasyviajes.net/gr/gr7/gr7-index.html
- Path in France: GR7 From Vosges to Pyrenees region (Full itinerary)
- GR7 From Ballon d'Alsace to Darney (Vosges)
- GR7 From Darney (Vosges) to Langres (Haute-Marne)
- GR7 From Langres (Haute-Marne) to Velars-sur-Ouche (Cote d'Or)
- GR7 From Velars-sur-Ouche (Cote d'Or) to Le Puley (Saone et Loire)
- GR7 From Le Puley (Saone et Loire) to Les Sauvages (Rhone)
- GR7 From Les Sauvages (Rhone) to Col de la Charousse (Haute-Loire, Ardeche)
- GR7 From Col de la Charousse (Haute-Loire, Ardeche) to La Bastide-Puylaurent (Lozere)
- GR7 From La Bastide-Puylaurent (Lozere) to L'Esperou (Gard)
- GR7 From L'Esperou (Gard) to Boussagues (Herault)
- GR7 From Boussagues (Herault) to Mazamet (Tarn)
- GR7 From Mazamet (Tarn) to Mirepoix (Ariege)
- GR7 From Mirepoix (Ariege) to Portella Blanca d'Andorra (France-Spain)
- E7 European long distance path
