= L2E =

L2E may refer to:

- L2: Empuraan (film), an Indian Malayalam-language action-thriller film
- Haplogroup L2e, a human mitochondrial haplogroup from West Africa
- Category L2e, a European vehicle category
- Postal Code L2E, a Canadian postal code for Niagara Falls, Ontario; see List of postal codes of Canada: L

== See also ==
- 12E (disambiguation)
- L2 (disambiguation)
- 2E (disambiguation)
