= GR 8 (path) =

Walking path

GR8
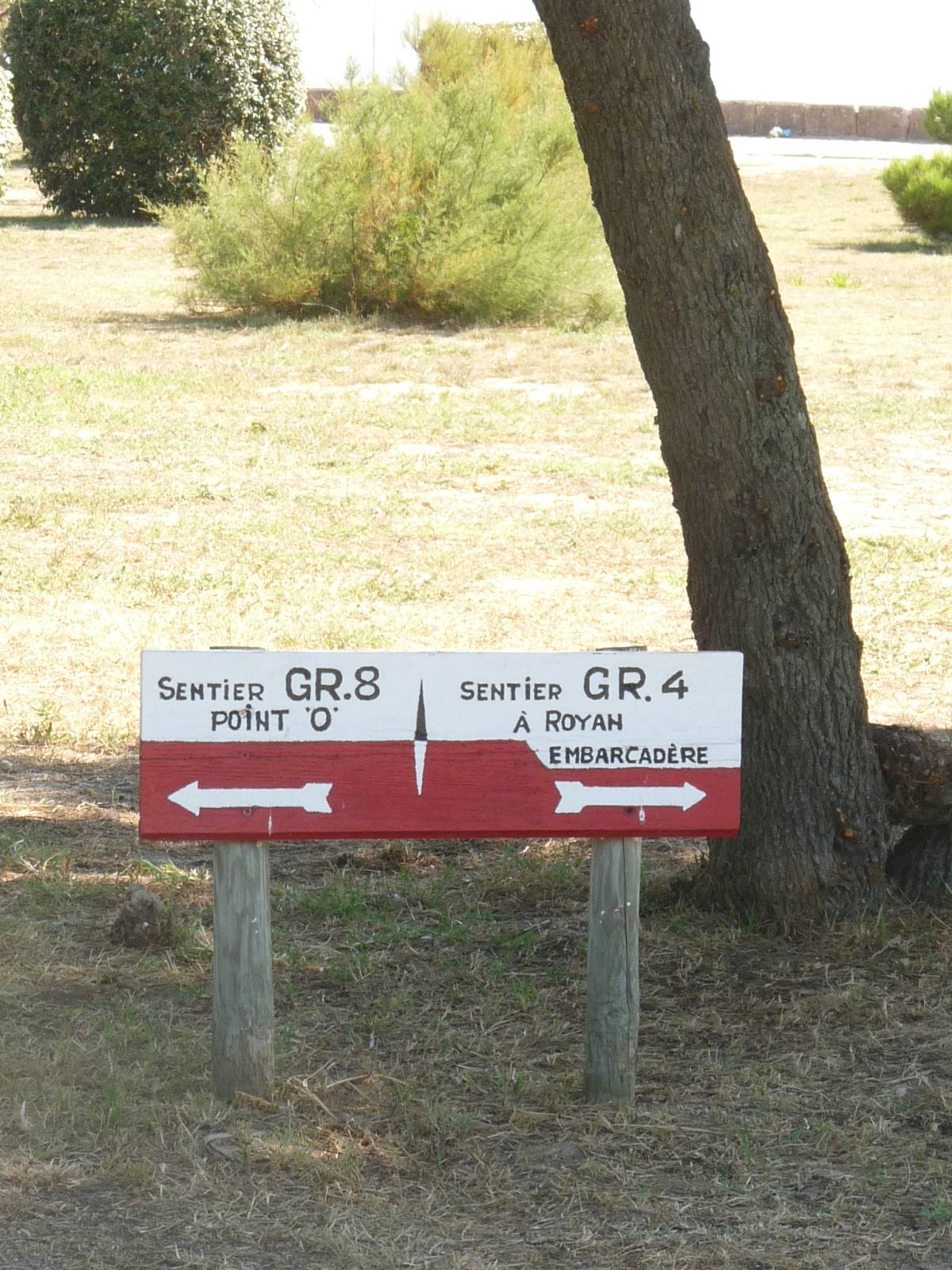
- Location: Loire-Atlantique, Vendée, Charente Maritime, Gironde, Landes, Pyrénées-Atlantiques
- Designation: GR footpath
- Trailheads: Saint-Brevin-les-Pins 47.267061°N 2.161868°W; * Sare, Pyrénées-Atlantiques 43.312730°N 1.580201°W
- Use: Hiking

The sentier de Grande Randonnée 8, or GR 8 for short, is a long distance hiking trail on the French Atlantic coast. It is part of the Grande Randonnée network and runs from Saint-Brevin-les-Pins (Loire-Atlantique, France) on the south of the Loire estuary, opposite the large port city of Saint-Nazaire and currently terminates at Sare in the Atlantic Pyrenees.

== Route ==
The path descends from the Côte de Jade of the Pays de Retz, through the Vendée and Charente-Maritime towards Royan, takes the ferry over the Gironde estuary and continues in the Gironde then the Landes, while following the Atlantic coast, before crossing the Adour further east, in Urt continuing south-west to Sare, the current trail head. There it joins the GR 10 which continues westward to Hendaye near the Spanish border and town of Irun and eastward through the Pyrénées-Atlantiques. The path therefore traverses six coastal administrative departments in two regions: Loire-Atlantique and Vendée in the Pays de Loire, and Charente-Maritime, Gironde, Landes and Pyrénées-Atlantiques in Nouvelle-Aquitaine.

== Description ==
The GR 8 is the youngest of the ten main routes (GR 1 to GR 10) of the French hiking network and has not yet been completely demarcated. However, several small gaps in the route can be easily filled by using other walking routes, such as the GR 364 at Talmont-Saint-Hilaire, the GR 360 and the GR 4 between Rochefort and Royan, and the Way of Saint James (the Voie Littorale) south of the Gironde estuary. In this latter area of Aquitaine, the GR 8 was almost completely defined and marked, but a number of private owners since prohibited the passage of GR walkers, so that a new route has to be found. In the vicinity of La Rochelle, hikers will have to find a suitable route for the time being.

The GR 8 is part of the E9 European long distance path linking Estonia with Portugal.
