= E10 European long distance path =

Walking path in Europe

E10
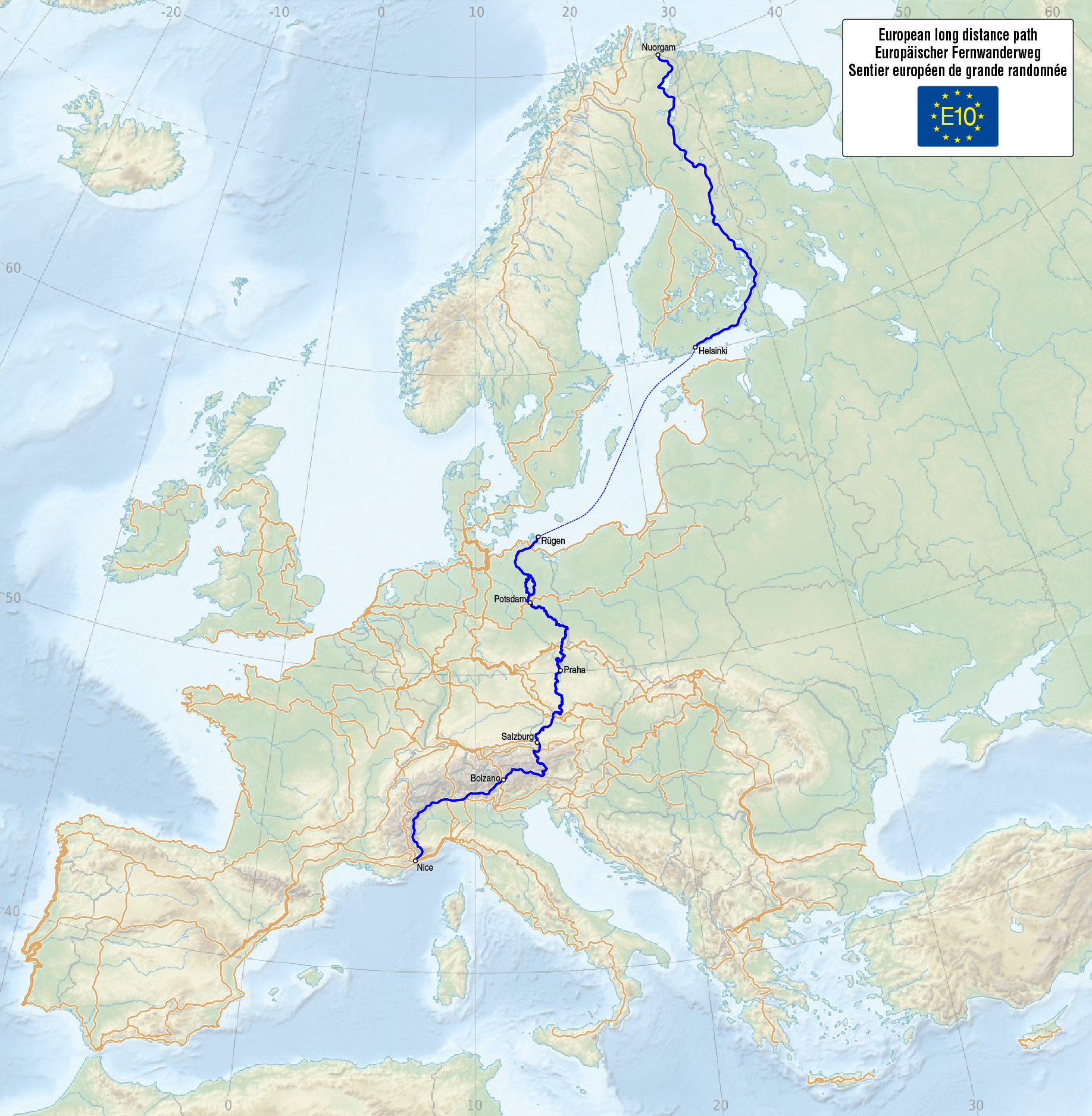
- (Partial) map of the E10 route excluding the southern section in Spain
- Use: Hiking

The E10 European long distance path or E10 path is one of the European long-distance paths, running from Finland through Germany, Czech Republic, Austria, Italy, France and follows the Mediterranean coast in Spain. European Ramblers' Association does not take any responsibility for E10 in Finland, because there is no ERA Member Organisation in that country.
