= 12th arrondissement =

12th arrondissement may refer to,

- 12th arrondissement of Marseille
- 12th arrondissement of Paris
- 12th arrondissement of the Littoral Department, Benin
