= Moratalla, Murcia =

Moratalla
- Municipality
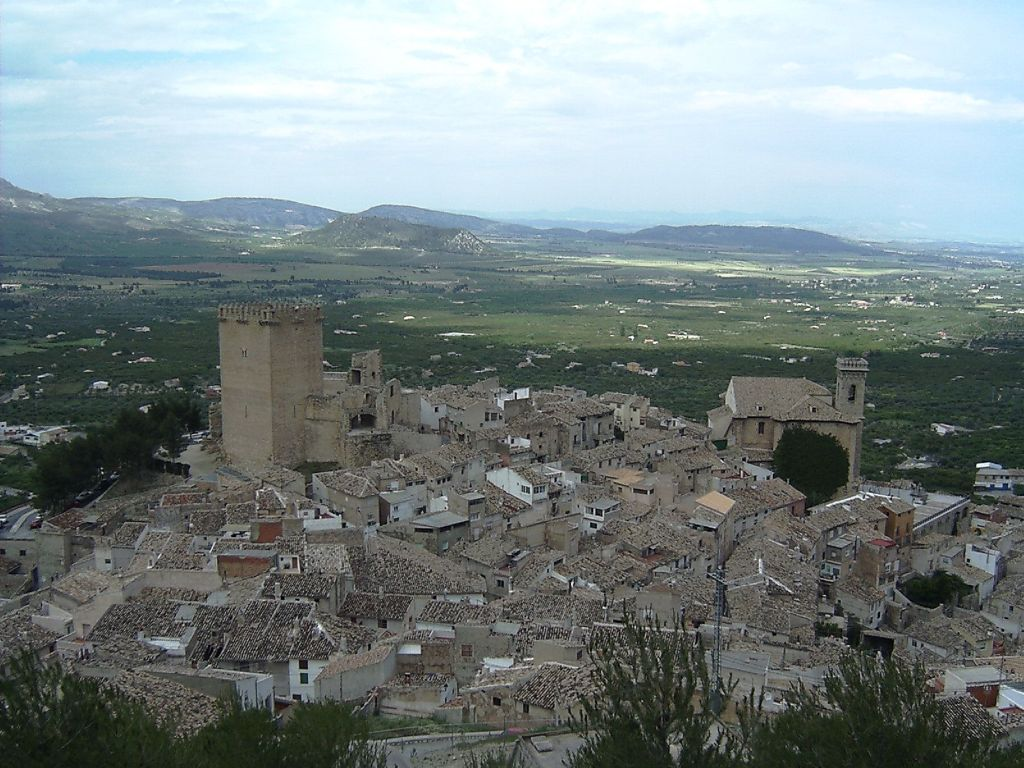

- Coat of arms

- Location in Murcia

- Location in Murcia Location in Spain
- Country: Spain
- Autonomous community: Region of Murcia
- Province: Murcia
- Comarca: Noroeste
- Judicial district: Caravaca de la Cruz

Area
  - Total: 954.82 km^{2} (368.66 sq mi)
- Elevation: 681 m (2,234 ft)

Population (2025-01-01)
  - Total: 7,518
  - Density: 7.874/km^{2} (20.39/sq mi)
- Demonym: Moratalleros
- Time zone: UTC+1 (CET)
  - Summer (DST): UTC+2 (CEST)
- Postal code: 30440
- Website: Official website

Moratalla is a small town and the center of a large municipality of the same name in the Autonomous Community of the Region of Murcia in southeastern Spain. In 2018, the population of Moratalla was 7,944: some 5,600 in the town of Moratalla itself and the rest in districts such as Otos, Benizar, El Sabinar or Casa Requena.

Its main economic resources are tourism and agriculture (apricots, almonds, olives and olive oil, wood, barley).

== Geography ==
It is chiefly a mountainous and comparatively cool territory (with regard to the region), snow being frequent in the highest zones (Revolcadores, 2,015 m or 6,611 ft) and cold valleys (Campo de San Juan, El Sabinar). It is crossed by minor rivers (Alhárabe, Benamor) which flow into the Segura. There is a main reservoir of the Segura at El Cenajo. Main representatives of the local fauna are wild boars, Spanish Ibex, short-toed eagles and Moorish turtles. Wide portions of the municipality are protected in ZEPAs (Special Protection Areas) or LICs (Site of Community Importance areas).

== History ==
There are some spots with cave paintings in this current municipality that give of people occupancy during the Prehistory.

There was presence of people during the Bronze Age, and presence of people who belonged to Argaric culture during the late Bronze Age.

After the Muslim invasion (711-726), some Berber clans settled in Moratalla.

Moratalla was conquered by the Order of Santiago (a religious military order) in 1212, in the context of Reconquista and the Battle of Las Navas de Tolosa.

An own municipality was established for Moratalla in 1245, after the Castilian conquest in Taifa of Murcia, and it split from the municipality Segura de la Sierra (in Jaén province).

Francis, Duke of Cádiz (13 May 1822 – 17 April 1902), king consort of Spain, adopted the incognito title of Count of Moratalla after his exile to France in 1868.

== Demographics ==
4.25% inhabitants are foreigners – 1.5% are from other countries of Europe, 2.15% are Africans, 36 (0.45%) are Americans and 12 Asian people (0.15%) reside in Moratalla. The table below shows the population trend during 20th and 21st centuries by the beginning of the decades.

	1900	1910	1920	1930	1940	1950	1960	1970	1981	1991	2001	2011
Population	12,816	13,497	13,477	13,815	15,013	14,136	14,205	10,664	9,374	8,976	8,595	8,305

== Economy ==
In 2022, 20% of the territory is utilised for agriculture purposes; the most widely grown crops are almonds, barley, olives, oats, and lavender. Across all of 2022, 20.14% of employment contracts were signed for agriculture and fishing jobs, 55.26% were signed for jobs in the industrial sector, 2.52% were signed for jobs in the construction sector, and 22.07% were signed by workers of the service sector.

== Main sights ==
Moratalla's sights include the Fortress Castle (Spanish: Castillo Fortaleza), home to the "Tribute Tower" (Spanish: La Torre del Homenaje), a military-gothic style building which dates from the 15th century. There is also an Arab castle in Benizar, built in the 12th century.

The Catholic Church of Our Lady of the Asunción (Spanish: Iglesia de Nuestra Señora de la Asunción) dates from the 16th century). Other churches include Santa Ana or San Francisco and the "House of Christ" (Spanish: La Casa de Cristo), on the mountain, built by the Order of La Merced from the 16th century.

There are two Roman bridges in Moratalla: the Jesus Christ Bridge over the Benámor River, and the Hellin Bridge over the Alhárabe River.

== Events ==
=== Holy Week ===
During the Holy Week, there is a traditional tamborada, a collective drumming performance in what is known as the Drummers Festival ("Fiestas del Tambor de Moratalla"), which can last for three days (Maundy Thursday, Good Friday and Easter Sunday). In southern Spain, tamboradas are characteristic of Moratalla as well as of Mula (in Murcia) and Hellín and Tobarra (in Albacete). A unique aspect of Moratalla's Holy Week is that every tamborista (snare drummer) dresses in distinct, handmade robes and for some hoods or capiotes. The snare drums of the town, which are larger today, are also traditionally handmade with the snares made currently of similar materials as those made in Mula, which are beaten currently with special drumsticks shaped like mallets.

=== Fiestas del Santísimo Cristo del Rayo ===
The celebration of the Holy Christ of the Thunder takes place in the streets of Moratalla, in which cows and bulls are set free. People get together into their peñas, placed in the Eldest Street "Calle Mayor", where they enjoy the party. There is also a fair which may be visited every night from 10 to 17 July. It's like an amusement park with many "street-shops" where you can buy some handmade products.

== Notable people ==
- Esteban Navarro (Moratalla, 1965), writer. Born in Moratalla.

== Images ==
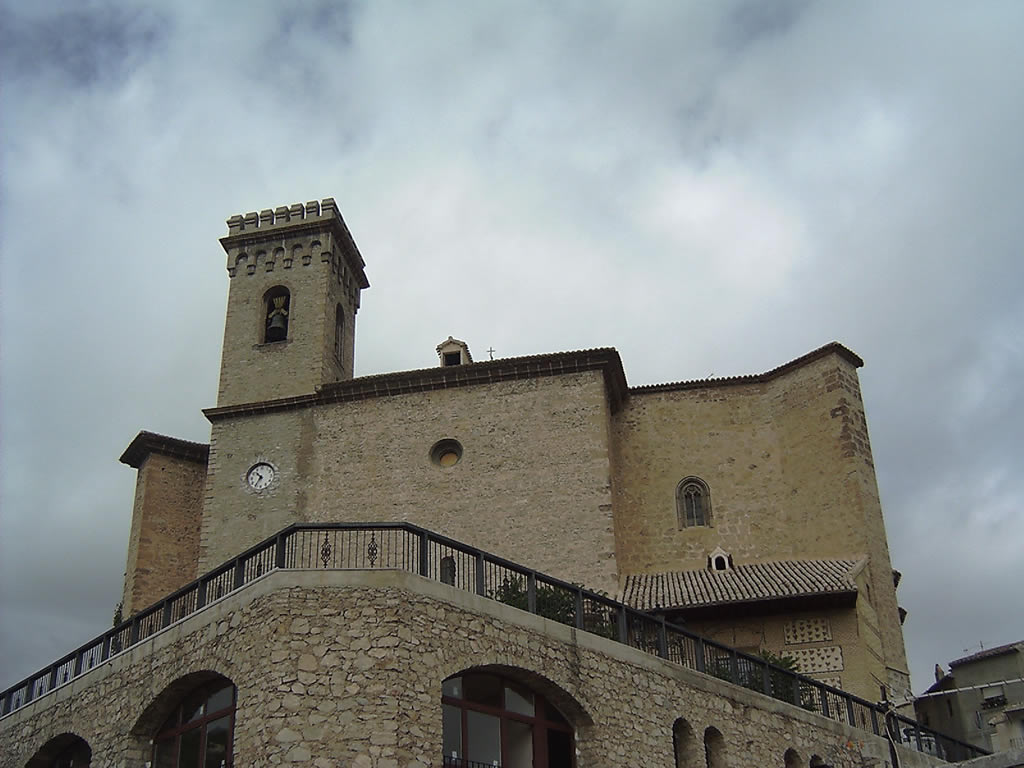
Santa María de la Asunción

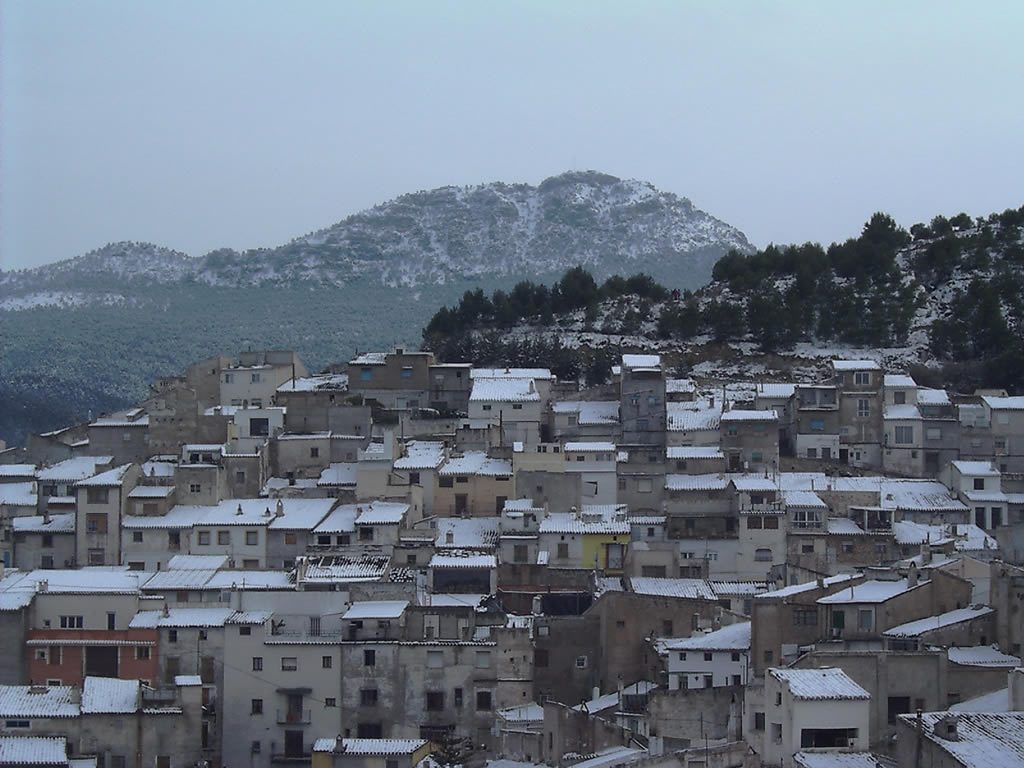
Old district and Buitre hilltop

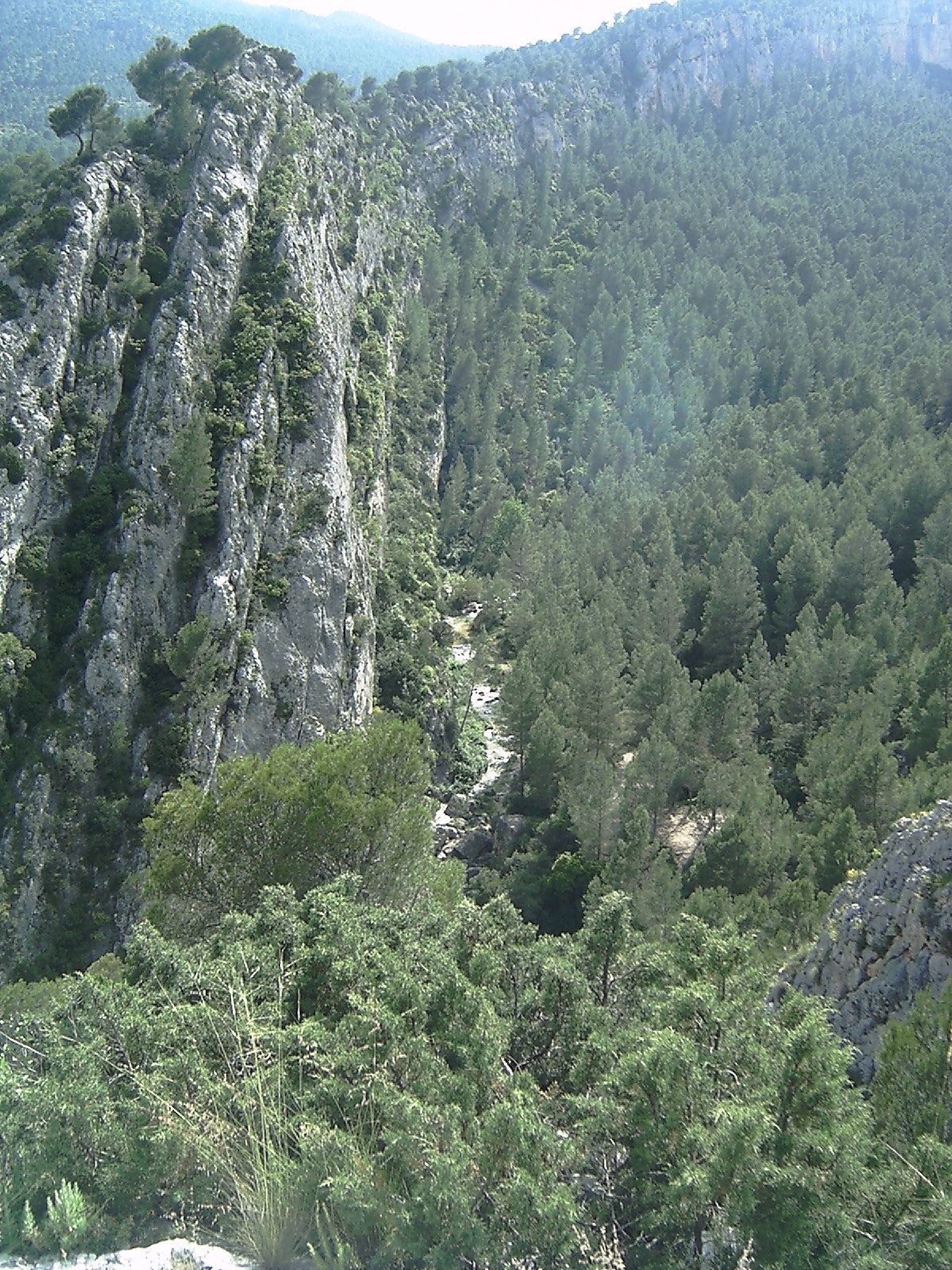
Alhárabe River

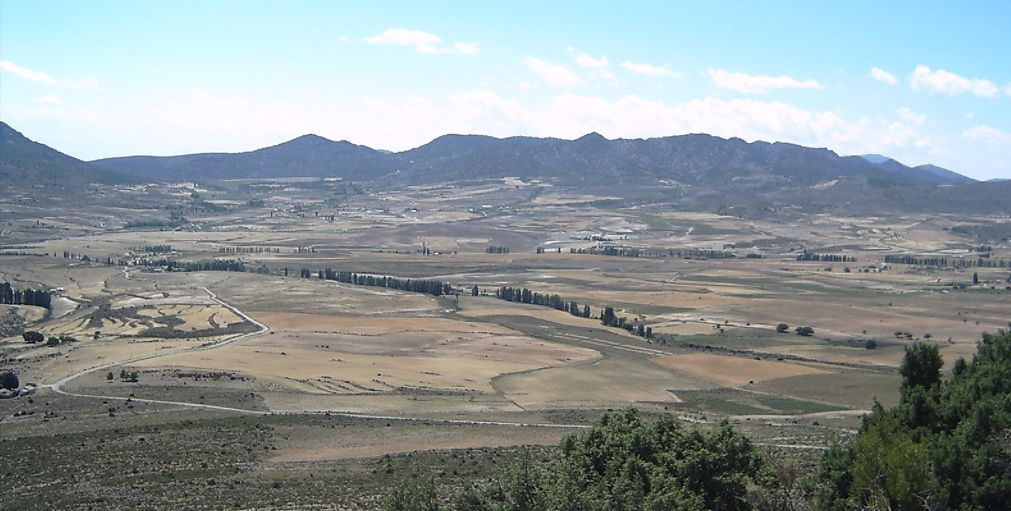
Campo de San Juan

== See also ==
- Inazares
- Cañada de la Cruz
- List of municipalities in the Region of Murcia
