= Sainte-Marie-sur-Mer =

Former commune in Loire-Atlantique, France

Coordinates: 47°6′46″N 2°7′55″W

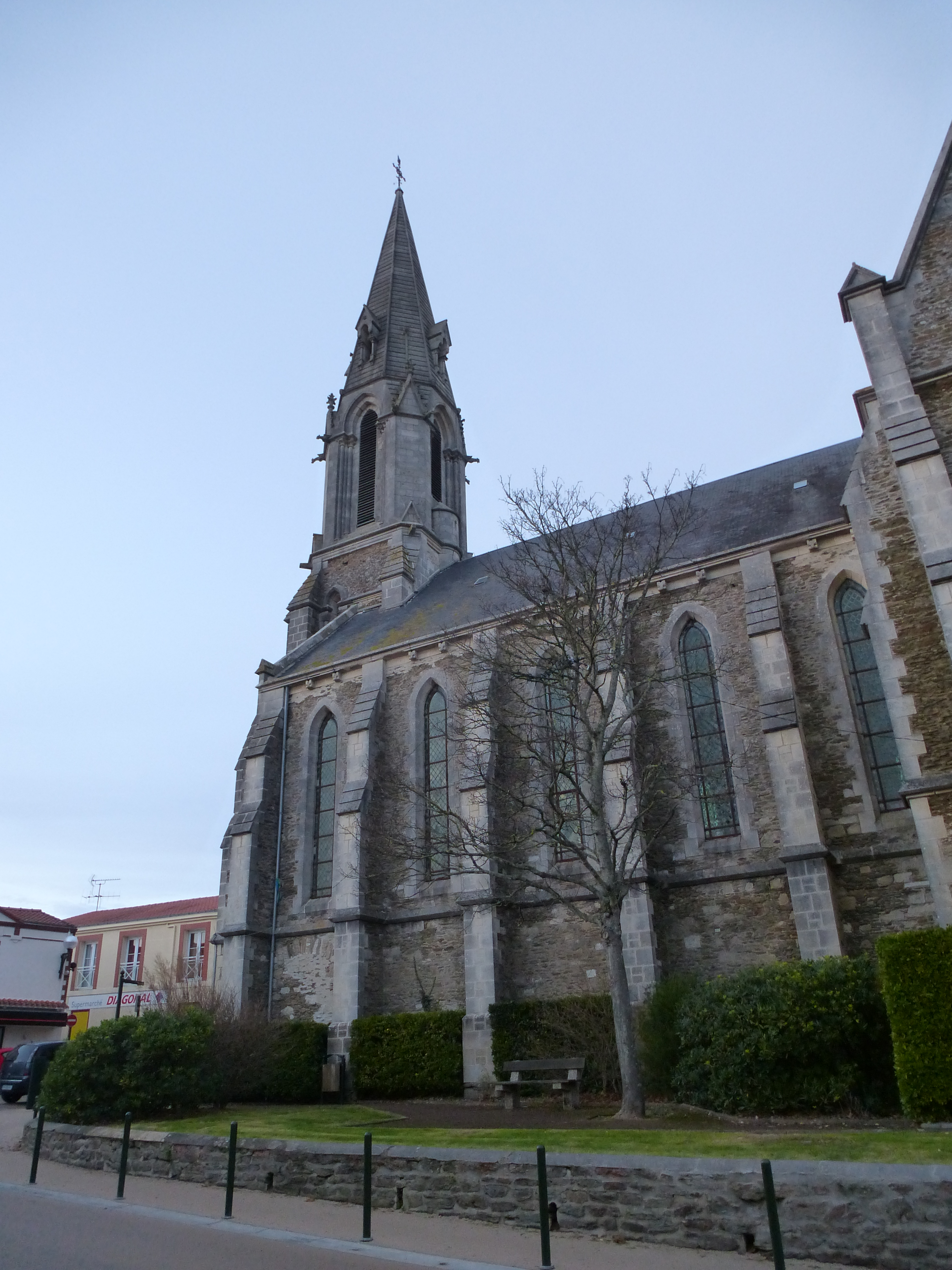
L'eglise de ste marie a pornic - panoramio

Sainte-Marie-sur-Mer (French pronunciation: [sɛ̃t maʁi syʁ mɛʁ]; Breton: Lokmaria-Pornizh), officially Sainte-Marie, is a former commune in the Pays de Retz, situated in the Loire-Atlantique département and in the French région of Pays de la Loire. From 1973, it was absorbed by the neighbouring commune of Pornic and from 1 July 2007 it became a subdivision of this commune.

The commune forms a part of Brittany, in the traditional county of Retz and in the historical Pays Nantais.

The inhabitants of Sainte-Marie are known as the Sanmaritains and Sanmaritaines.

== Geography ==
Sainte-Marie-sur-Mer is a market town on the Côte de Jade, with a jagged coastline strewn with coves.

== History ==
At one time, during the French First Republic, Sainte-Marie was known as Roche-Peltier.

The commune of Sainte-Marie was attached to that of Pornic on 1 June 1973 (under the terms of the Marcelin law of 16 July 1971).

On 16 May 2006 the Sanmaritains voted for the complete amalgamation of the communes of Sainte-Marie-sur-Mer and Pornic with 50.83% of the vote in favour (with a difference of just 47 votes out of more than 2800 voters). In effect, from 1973, Sainte-Marie-sur-Mer possessed a status of associated commune with Pornic and removed the deputy mayor of Sainte-Marie, Jean-François Cossé who had opposed the amalgamation of the two communes.

On 1 July 2007, after the acceptance by the prefect of the amalgamation of the communes of Pornic and Sainte-Marie-sur-Mer, the latter lost its status as associated commune and became a subdivision of Pornic .

== List of mayors ==
- Abbé Beaudouin -1823
- Bodin des Plantes 1823-
- Edouard Thomas -1828
- François Raffin 1828- (maire provisoire)
- Edouard Thomas -1852
- René Laraison 1852-1870
- Michel Picot 1870-1884
- François Maurice 1884-1886
- Jules Galot 1886-
- Guillon Constant 1886-
- Souchlaud
- Bézier
- Rouhaud

After the amalgamation with the town of Pornic, Sainte-Marie-sur-Mer and the aforementioned Pornic came to represent a single electoral zone.

== Demographics ==
Historical population

Year	Pop.	±% p.a.
1793	1,220	—
1800	1,097	−1.51%
1806	1,119	+0.33%
1821	1,286	+0.93%
1831	1,458	+1.26%
1841	1,459	+0.01%
1846	1,414	−0.62%
1851	1,501	+1.20%
1856	1,456	−0.61%
1861	1,484	+0.38%
1866	1,517	+0.44%
1872	1,532	+0.16%
1876	1,536	+0.07%
1881	1,522	−0.18%

Year	Pop.	±% p.a.
1886	1,604	+1.06%
1891	1,715	+1.35%
1896	1,837	+1.38%
1901	1,850	+0.14%
1906	1,832	−0.20%
1911	1,792	−0.44%
1921	1,578	−1.26%
1926	1,652	+0.92%
1931	1,658	+0.07%
1936	1,638	−0.24%
1946	1,736	+0.58%
1954	1,869	+0.93%
1962	1,899	+0.20%
1968	2,059	+1.36%

Source: EHESS

== Places and monuments ==
- Sainte-Marie church
- Le chateau de La Mossardière
- Commonwealth war graves in Ste. Marie Communal Cemetery

== People from Sainte-Marie-sur-Mer ==
- René Babonneau

== Resiting of the market ==
Since the end of March 2007 the market was moved creating a heated debate between tradesman, customers and the town hall. In the Courier of the Pays de Retz of 5 April 2007 the writer of the article spoke of a toxic atmosphere in the town.

== See also ==
- Communes of the Loire-Atlantique department
- Baie de Bourgneuf
- Côte de Jade
- Pays de Retz
- Pornic
- Pêcherie

== Notes ==
- This article is based on the equivalent article from the French Wikipedia, consulted on March 6th 2008.
