= Inazares =

Coordinates: 38°05′N 2°13′W

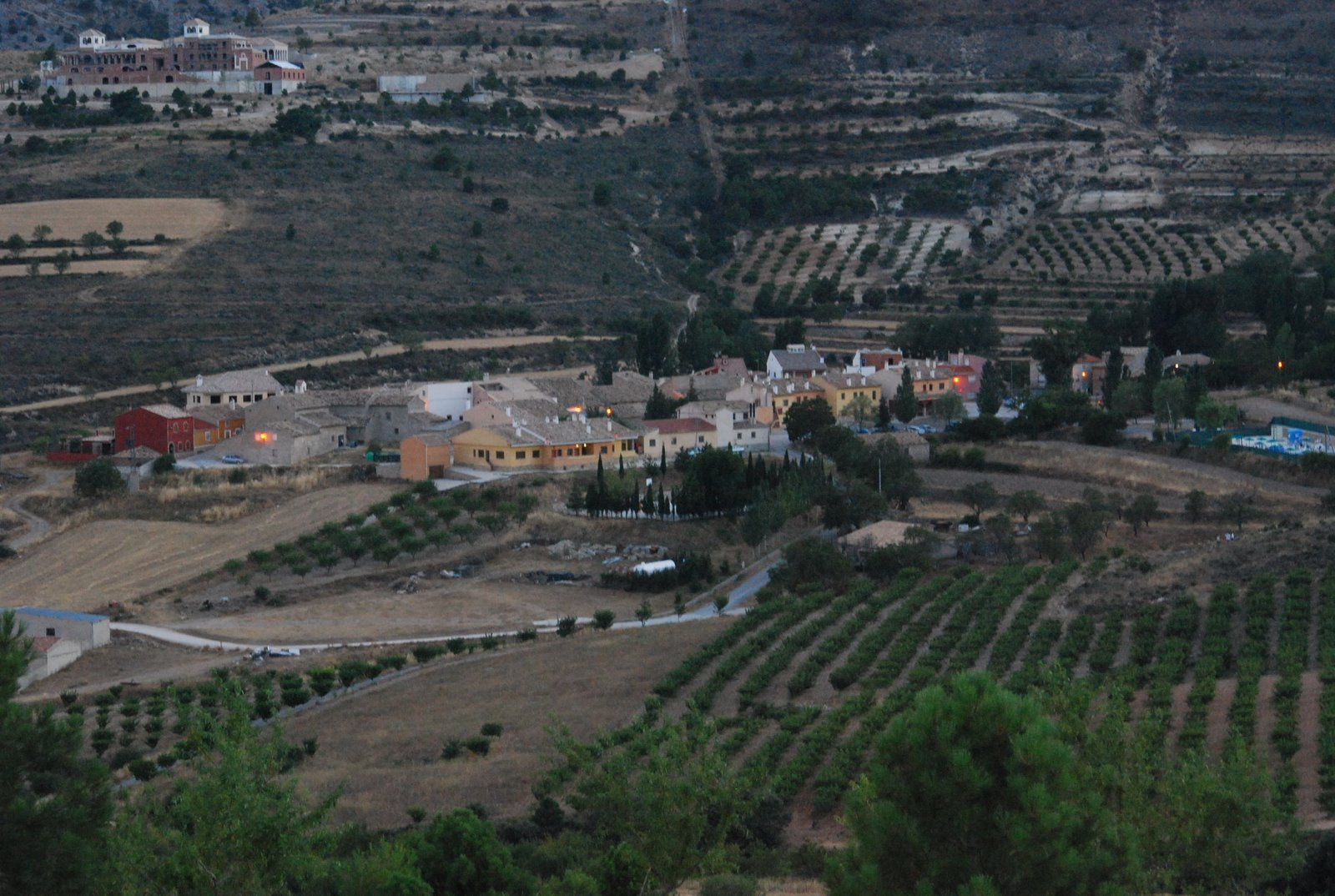
Inazares

Inazares is a dependent village of Moratalla, Murcia, Spain with a population of 40. It lies in La Rogativa Valley at an altitude of 1.350 m above sea level

Because of its geographic location and its low light pollution, Inazares' sky has been catalogued by NASA as a good location for observing the night sky.

Inazares is home to griffon vultures, Spanish ibex, boars and the peregrine falcon.
