= Cañada de la Cruz =

- Population unit
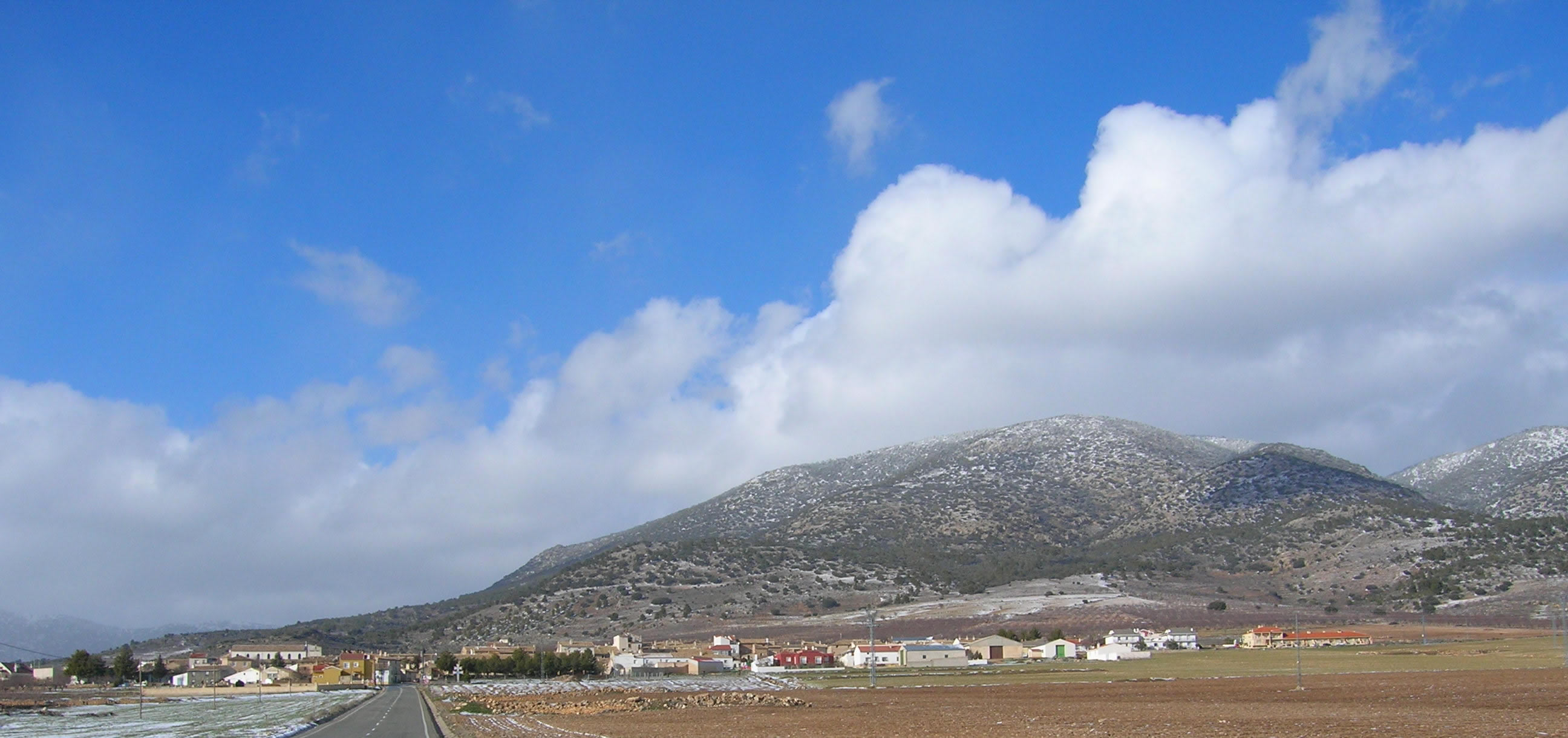

- Location within Spain
- Coordinates: 38°01′51″N 2°16′46″W
- Country: Spain
- Region: Region of Murcia
- Municipality: Moratalla
- Elevation: 1,273 m (4,177 ft)

Cañada de la Cruz is a small village of Spain, belonging to the municipality of Moratalla, in the Region of Murcia.

It lies at 1,273 metres (4,177 ft) metres above sea level, on the southern foothills of Los Revolcadores (2,027 m), part of the Sierra de Moratalla mountain range.

To the north of the settlement there is a site displaying cave art paintings.

As late as the 1420s (battle of Puerto del Conejo), skirmishes took between Castile and Granada following the break of the truces place in the area.

By the late 2010s, Cañada de la Cruz had a population of about 150 in the Winter (reportedly increasing tenfold in the Summer). In 2018, parallel to an alleged "abandonment" of the village on the part of the municipality of Moratalla, a number of neighbors of Cañada de la Cruz reportedly sought to initiate a process to become independent from Moratalla and becoming part of Caravaca or Puebla de Don Fadrique (the latter in the province of Granada) instead.
