= European long-distance paths =

E-paths
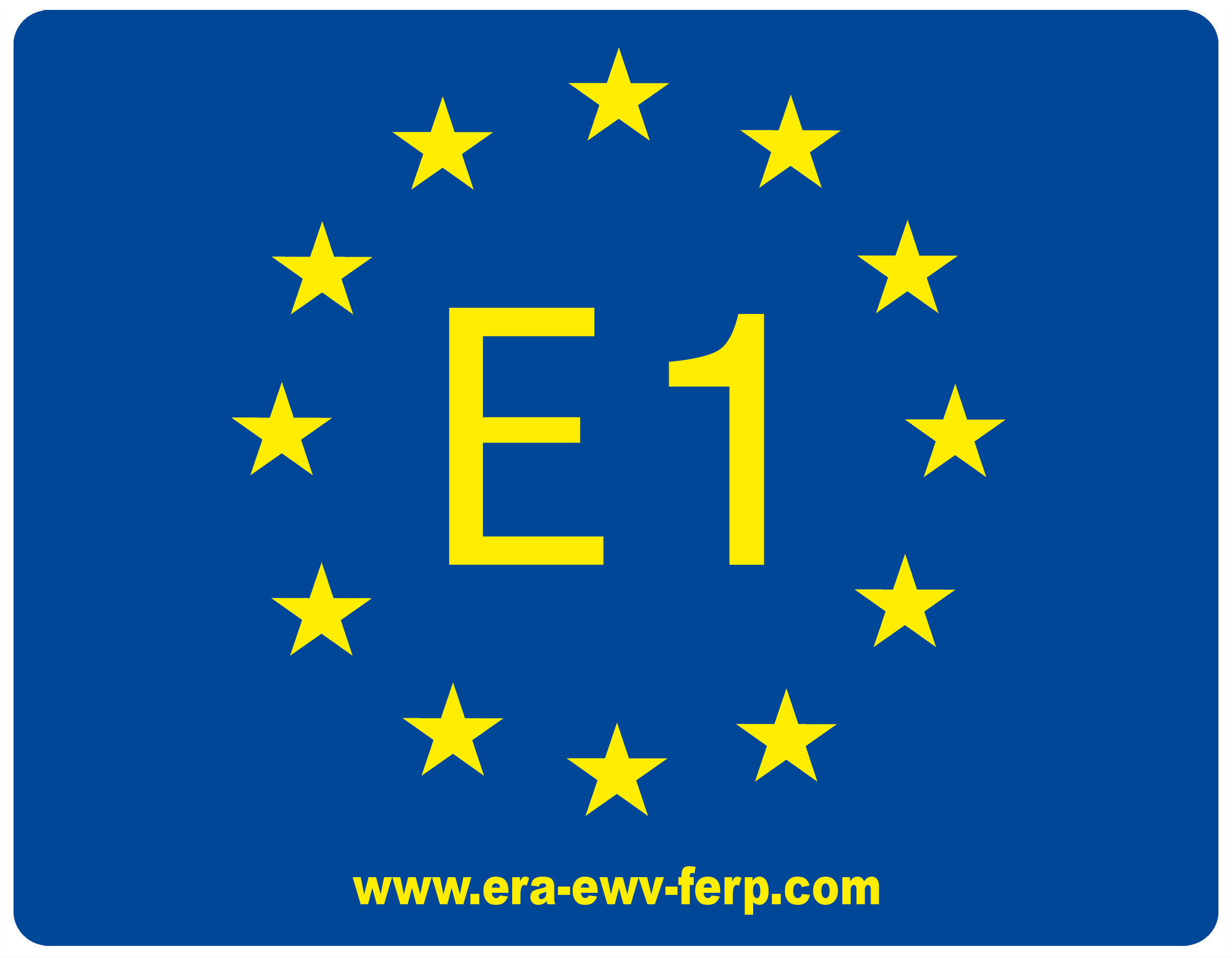

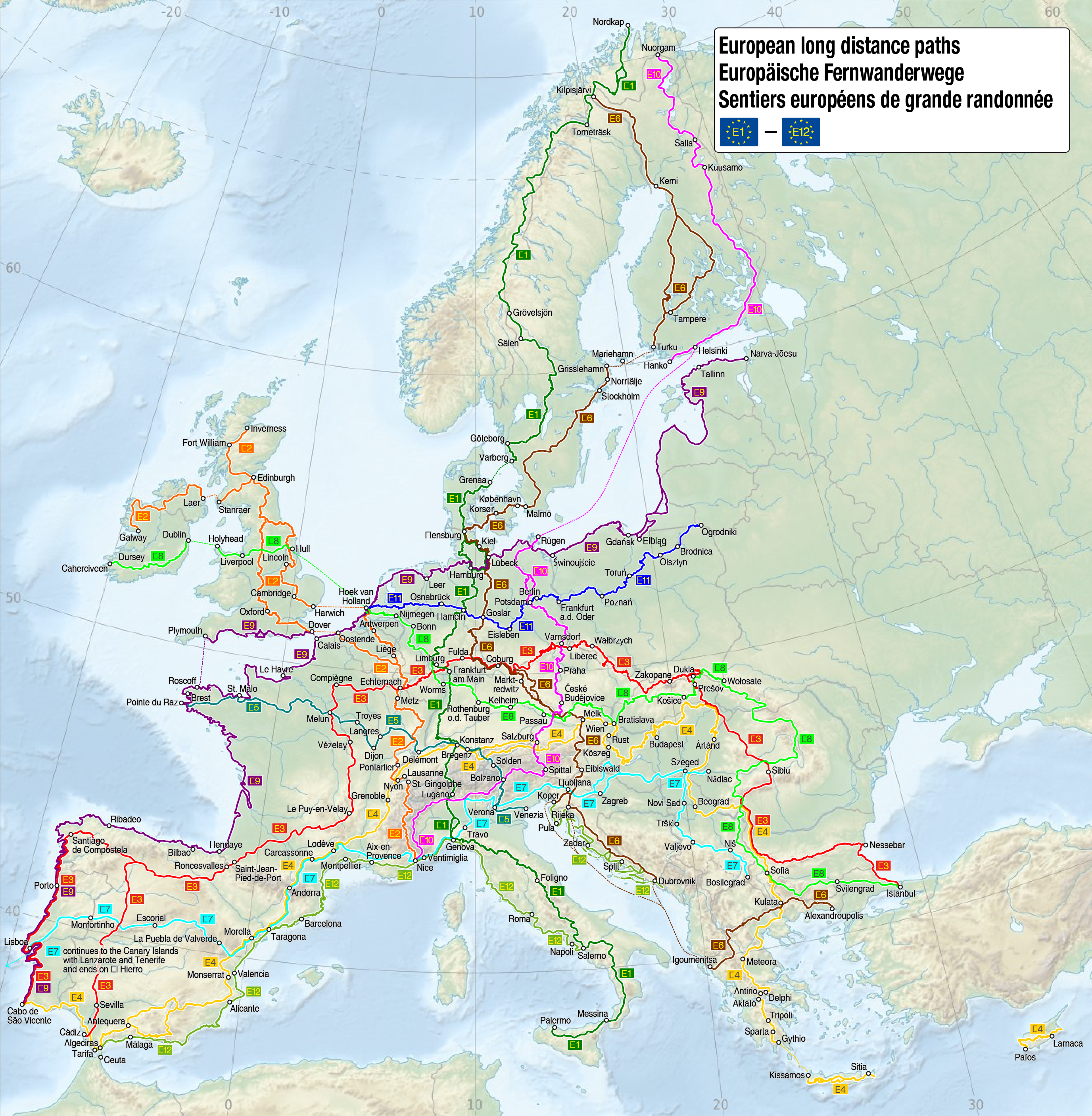

System information
- Length: 65,000 km (40,000 mi)
- Formed: 1995

Highway names
- E-path: E nn

System links
- International E-road network; A Class; B Class

The European long-distance paths (E-paths) are a network of long-distance footpaths that traverse Europe. While most long-distance footpaths on the continent are located in just one country or region, each of these numbered long-distance trails passes through many countries.

The first long-distance hiking trail in Europe was the National Blue Trail of Hungary, established in 1938. The formation of the European Union in 1993 made transnational hiking trails possible. Presently, the network consists of 12 paths and covers more than 65,000 kilometres (40,000 mi), crisscrossing the continent. In general, the routes connect and make use of existing national and local trails, such as the GR footpaths.

The trails are officially designated by the European Ramblers' Association.

== List ==
List of the 12 European long-distance paths so far defined
#	Map	Route	Length
E1		Norway •Finland • Sweden • Denmark • Germany • Switzerland • Italy	7,000 kilometres (4,300 mi)
E2		Ireland • United Kingdom • Netherlands • Belgium • Luxembourg • France	4,850 kilometres (3,010 mi)
E3		Portugal • Spain • France • Belgium • Luxembourg • Germany • Czech Republic • Poland • Slovakia • Hungary • Romania • Bulgaria • Turkey	6,950 kilometres (4,320 mi)
E4		Portugal • Spain • France • Switzerland • Germany • Austria • Hungary • Romania • Serbia • Bulgaria • Greece • Cyprus	10,000 kilometres (6,200 mi)
E5		France • Switzerland • Germany • Austria • Italy	3,200 kilometres (2,000 mi)
E6		Finland • Sweden • Denmark • Germany • Austria • Slovenia • Croatia • Greece • Turkey	6,300 kilometres (3,900 mi)
E7		Portugal • Spain • Andorra • France • Italy • Slovenia • Croatia • Hungary • Serbia	6,000 kilometres (3,700 mi)
E8		Ireland • United Kingdom • Netherlands • Germany • Austria • Slovakia • Poland • Ukraine • Romania • Bulgaria • Turkey	4,700 kilometres (2,900 mi)
E9		Portugal • Spain • France • United Kingdom • Belgium • Netherlands • Germany • Poland • Kaliningrad Oblast • Lithuania • Latvia • Estonia	5,000 kilometres (3,100 mi)
E10		Finland • Germany • Czech Republic • Austria • Italy • France • Spain	2,880 kilometres (1,790 mi)
E11		Netherlands • Germany • Poland • Lithuania • Latvia • Estonia	3,506 kilometres (2,179 mi)
E12		Spain • France • Italy • Slovenia • Croatia	1,800 kilometres (1,100 mi)

== See also ==
- Transcaucasian Trail
- Geography of Europe
- EuroVelo, European cycle route network
- Long-distance trails in the United States
