= E7 European long distance path =

Walking path in Europe

E7
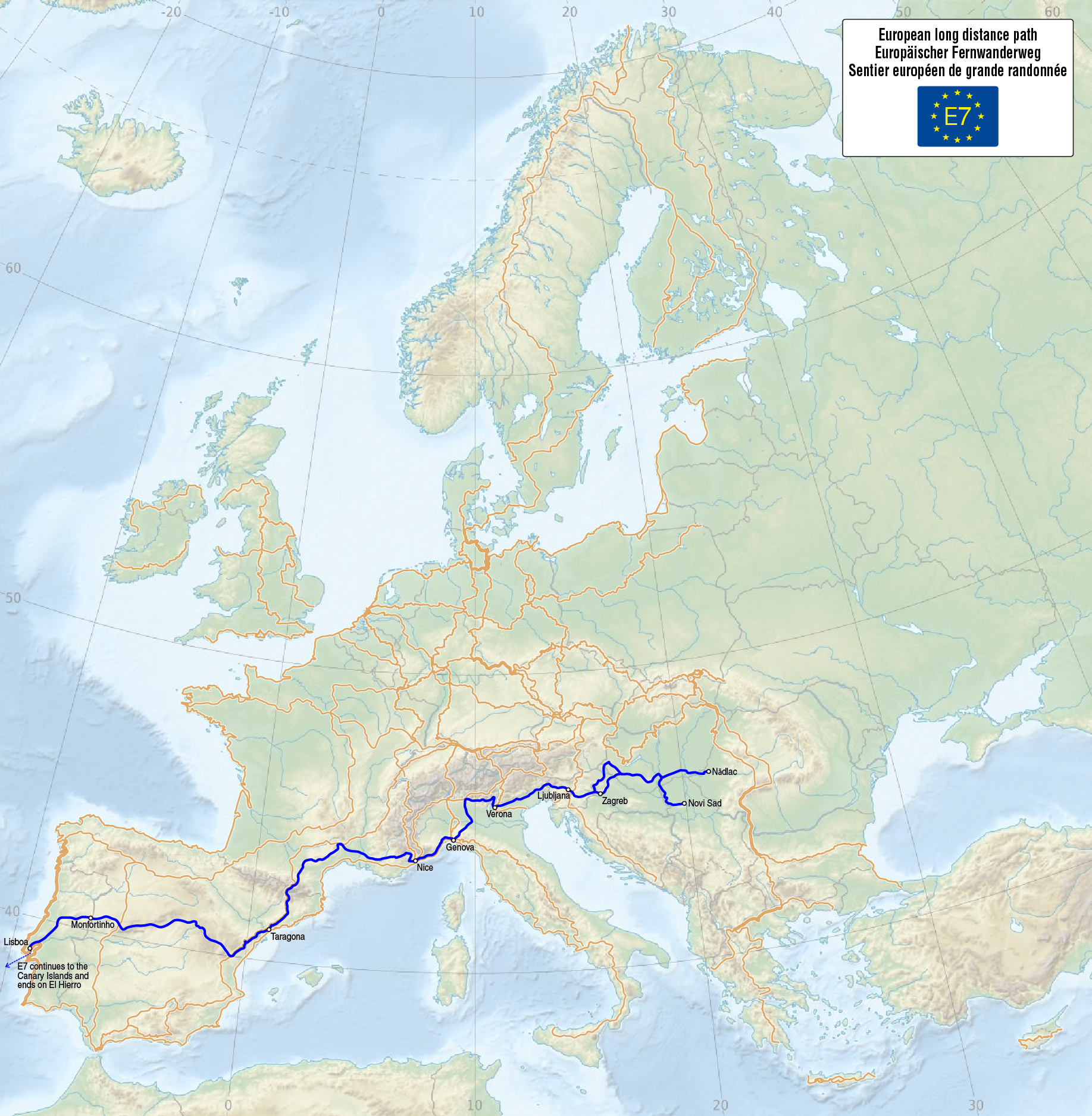
- Use: Hiking

The E7 European long distance path or E7 path is one of the European long-distance paths from the Portuguese-Spanish border eastwards through Andorra, France, Italy, Slovenia, Hungary and Serbia. It is projected to be extended to Lisbon and into Romania, so that it reaches from the Atlantic to the Black Sea, however these stages, as well as parts of the route through Italy, are still in planning.

== Route ==
Some of the places passed on the west-to-east route include:

- Monfortinho, Portugal
- Spain: see GR7 path
  - Catalonia,
  - Andalucía
  - Murcia
  - Valencia
  - Catalonia
- Andorra
- Mt Aigoual, France
- Lubéron, France
- Grasse, France
- hills above Nice, France
- Monte Lavagnola, Italy
- Travo, Italy
- Hodoš, Slovenia
- Bajánsenye, Hungary
- Szekszárd, Hungary
- Öttömös, Hungary
- Nagylak, Hungary
