= Côte de Jade =

Jade Coast Côte de Jade
- Riviera
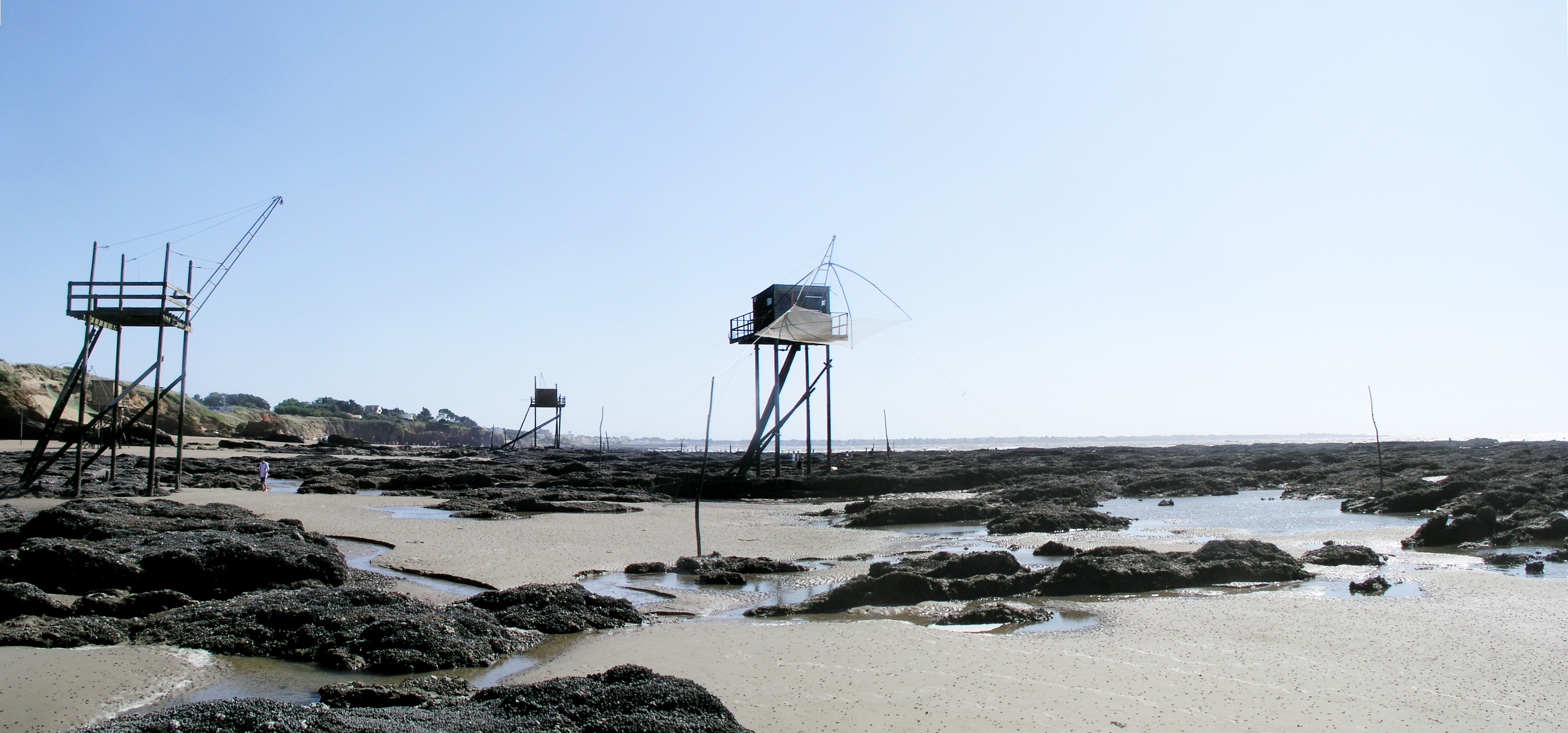
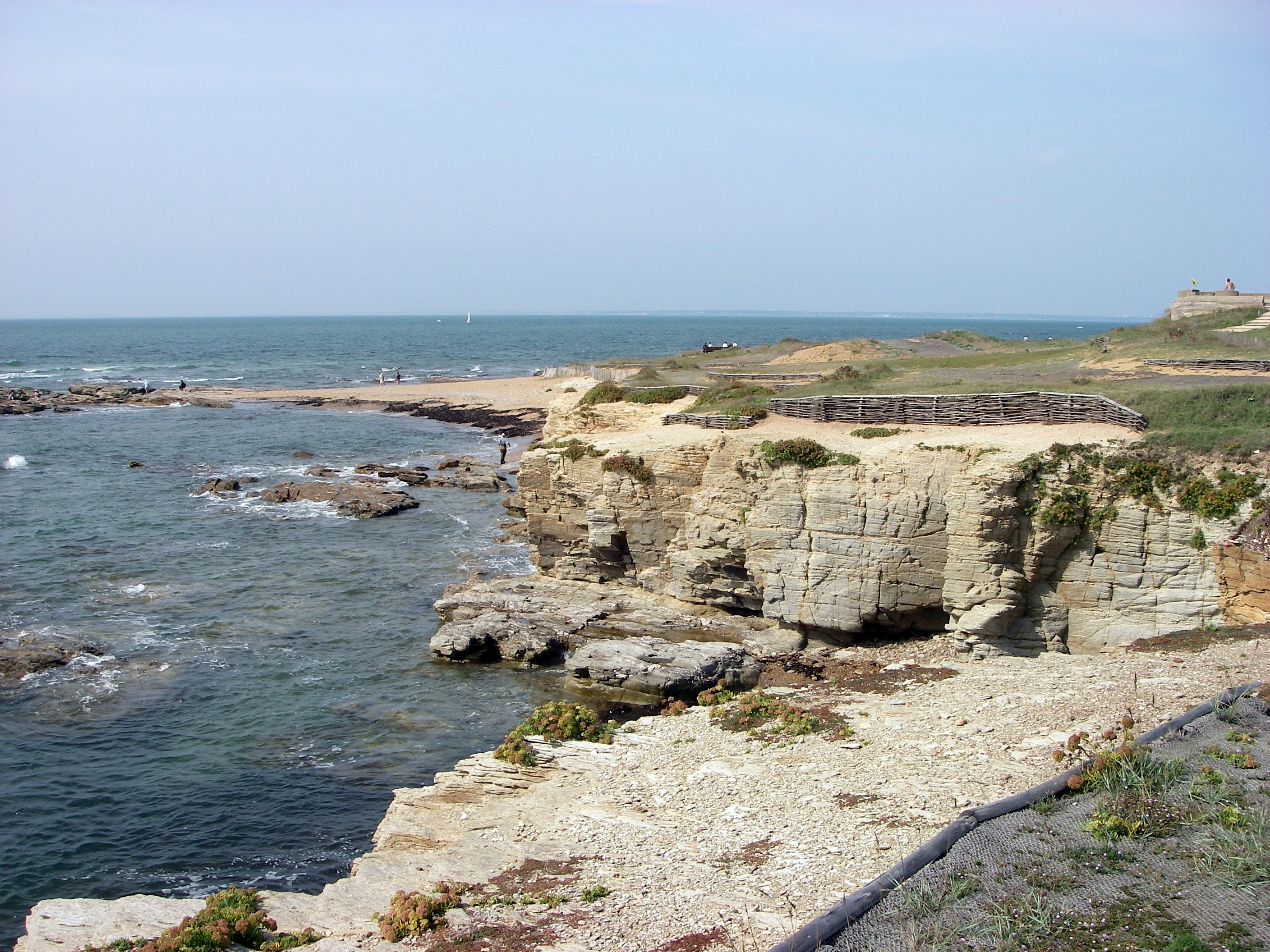
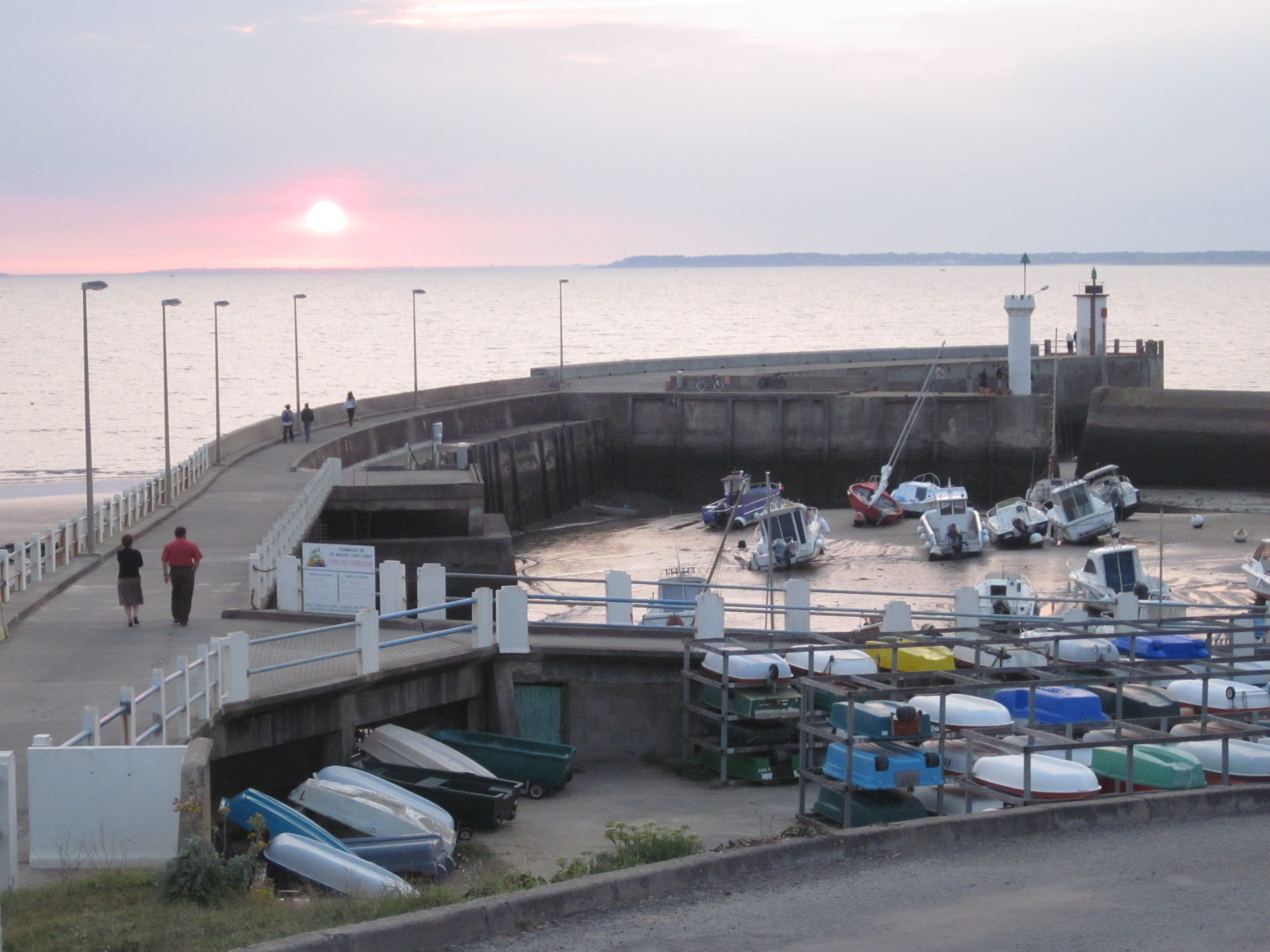
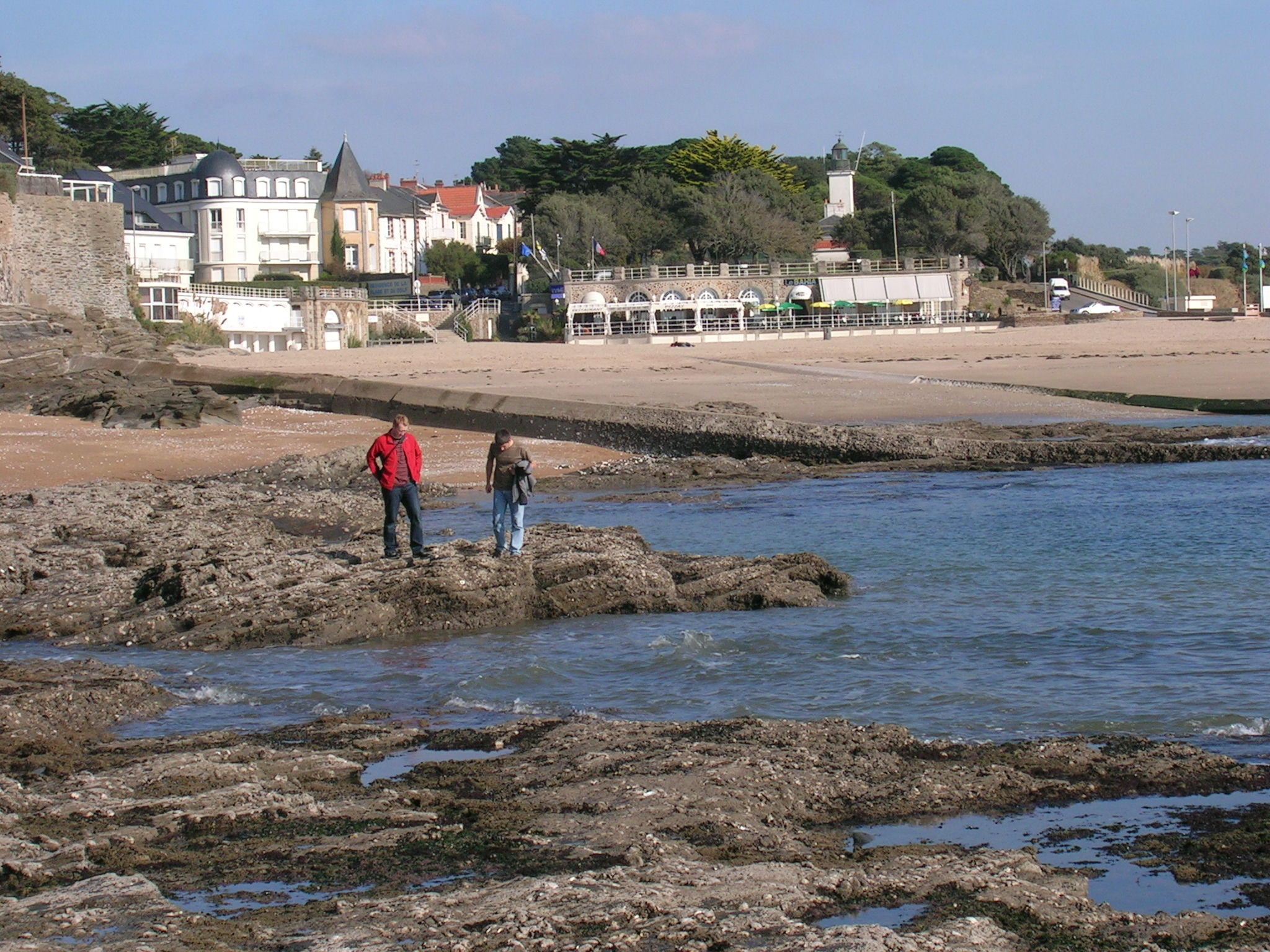
- From top down, left to right: Carrelets at la Roussellerie (Saint-Brévin-les-Pins), Port de Comberge at Tharon-Plage, La pointe Saint-Gildas in Prefailles, Noëveillard beach in Pornic.
- Interactive map of Jade Coast
- Coordinates: 47.135°N 2.245°W
- Country: France

The Jade Coast (French: Côte de Jade [kot də ʒad]; Breton: Arvor Jade) constitutes the coastal fringe of the Pays de Retz in Loire-Atlantique, extending from the Loire estuary in the north to the Marais breton in the south, thus bordering the Bay of Bourgneuf on its southern part. Its jagged coasts and its numerous beaches are of summer tourist interest.

== Description ==
There is a notable disparity between the coasts north and south of Pointe Saint-Gildas.

To the north, from Mindin (Saint-Brevin-les-Pins) to Cormier (La Plaine-sur-Mer) stretch long fine sandy beaches with vast foreshores, bordered by pine-wooded dunes or low cliffs.

To the south, from La Plaine-sur-Mer to La Bernerie-en-Retz, the coast is wilder and presents a succession of coves and more or less reduced beaches, separated by rocky areas with larger schist cliffs. These then fade into the mudflats, salt marshes and polders of the Marais Breton around Les Moutiers-en-Retz.

== Development ==
Tourism in the Pays de Retz developed from the late 17th century with the fashion for therapeutic bathing leading to the development of beach facilities in Pornic.

== Toponymy ==
The Côte de Jade was named from jade-green colours of the sea during the expansion of tourism during the 1930s.

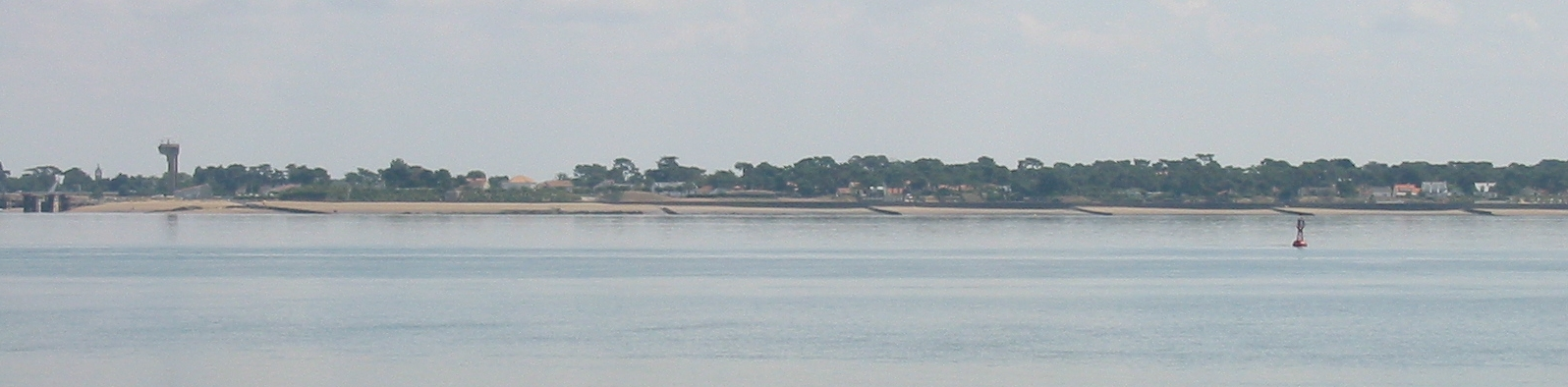
Côte de Jade at Saint-Brevin-les-Pins

== Resorts ==
The principal resorts of the Côte de Jade are:

- Saint-Brevin-les-Pins
- Saint-Michel-Chef-Chef
- Tharon-Plage
- La Plaine-sur-Mer
- Préfailles
- Sainte-Marie-sur-Mer
- Pornic
- La Bernerie-en-Retz
- Les Moutiers-en-Retz.
