= E12 European long distance path =

Long-distance path

E12
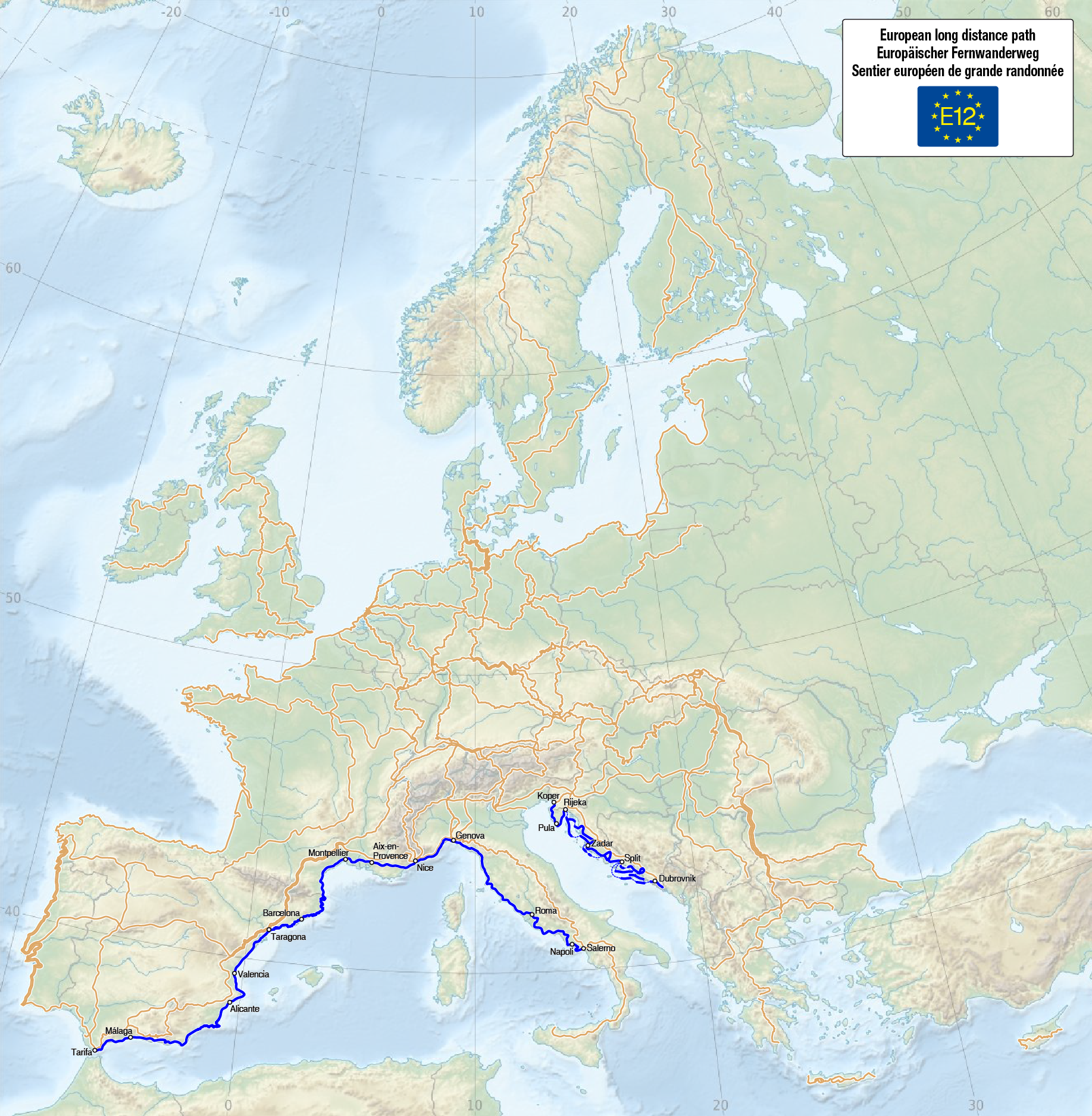
- Use: Hiking

The E12 European long distance path or E12 path is one of the twelve European long-distance paths. It passes through Spain, France, Italy, Slovenia and Croatia.

The E12 path is currently under construction and is planned to be 1,800km in length. A section has been completed in Marina di Camerota, South of Napoli, allowing hikers to experience the E12 path before it is fully completed. The path will connect the Mediterranean coast, as well as islands such as Majorca, Corsica, Crete, Cyprus, Malta and Sardinia.

== Spain ==
The E12 path in Spain begins in Portbou and finishes in Tarifa. It passes through the major cities of Barcelona and Malaga. The path is 772km in length and joins the E7 path in Tarifa.

The organisations responsible for the E12 in Spain are the: Federación de Entitats Excursionistes de Cataluña; Federación Aragonesa de Montañismo; Federación de Deportes de Montaña, Escalada y Senderismo de Castilla y Léon; Federación Extremeña de Montañismo and Federación Andaluza de Montañismo.

== France ==
The E12 path in France mainly follows the coastline, passing through the major cities of Montpellier and Nice.

The organisation responsible for the E12 path in France is the Fédération Française de la randonnée pédestre (FFRP).

== Italy ==
The E12 path is still under construction in Italy and many of the trail markings are not yet finished. Markup sections have been created in the area surrounding Mount Etna. However, the southernmost section of the E12 path in Italy is not yet complete, due to there being "no economic resources to support the works".

The organisation responsible for the E12 path in Italy is La Federazione Italiana Escursionismo (FIE Italia).

== Slovenia ==
The E12 path in Slovenia begins in Škofije (border with Italy) and finishes in Sečovlje (border with Croatia). The path follows the route of the Slovenian mountain trail to Hrvatini and down to Ankaran. The E12 path joins the E6 path in Belvedere and continues along the coast until reaching the Slovenia-Croatia border. The E12 path in Slovenia is 50km in length, equivalent to "3 days easy walking."

The organisations responsible for the E12 path in Slovenia are the: Planinska zveza Slovenije/Alpine Association of Slovenia and KEUPS (Komisija za evropske pešpoti v Sloveniji).

== Croatia ==
The E12 path in Croatia begins in Plovanija (on the Croatia-Slovenia border) and finishes in Poreč. The path in 59.4km in length and passes through the city of Grožnjan. Croatia uses a marking system of blue E12 signs with yellow stars, combined with red-white markers to clearly mark the E12 path.

The organisation responsible for the E12 path in Croatia is the Croatian Mountaineering Association.
