= European Ramblers' Association =

Hiking club

- Sport: Hiking
- Abbreviation: ERA/EWV/FERP
- Founded: 1969

Official website
- era-ewv-ferp.org

The European Ramblers' Association (ERA German: Europäische Wandervereinigung (EWV); French: Fédération Européenne de la Randonnée Pédestre (FERP)) is an organisation working to promote walking, hiking, trail creation, knowledge exchange, and public access to nature across Europe.

ERA has created a network of long-distance paths in Europe that are maintained by its member organisations. As of 2017, the network consisted of 12 trails covering more than 75,000 km.
