= Pointe Saint-Gildas =

- Headland
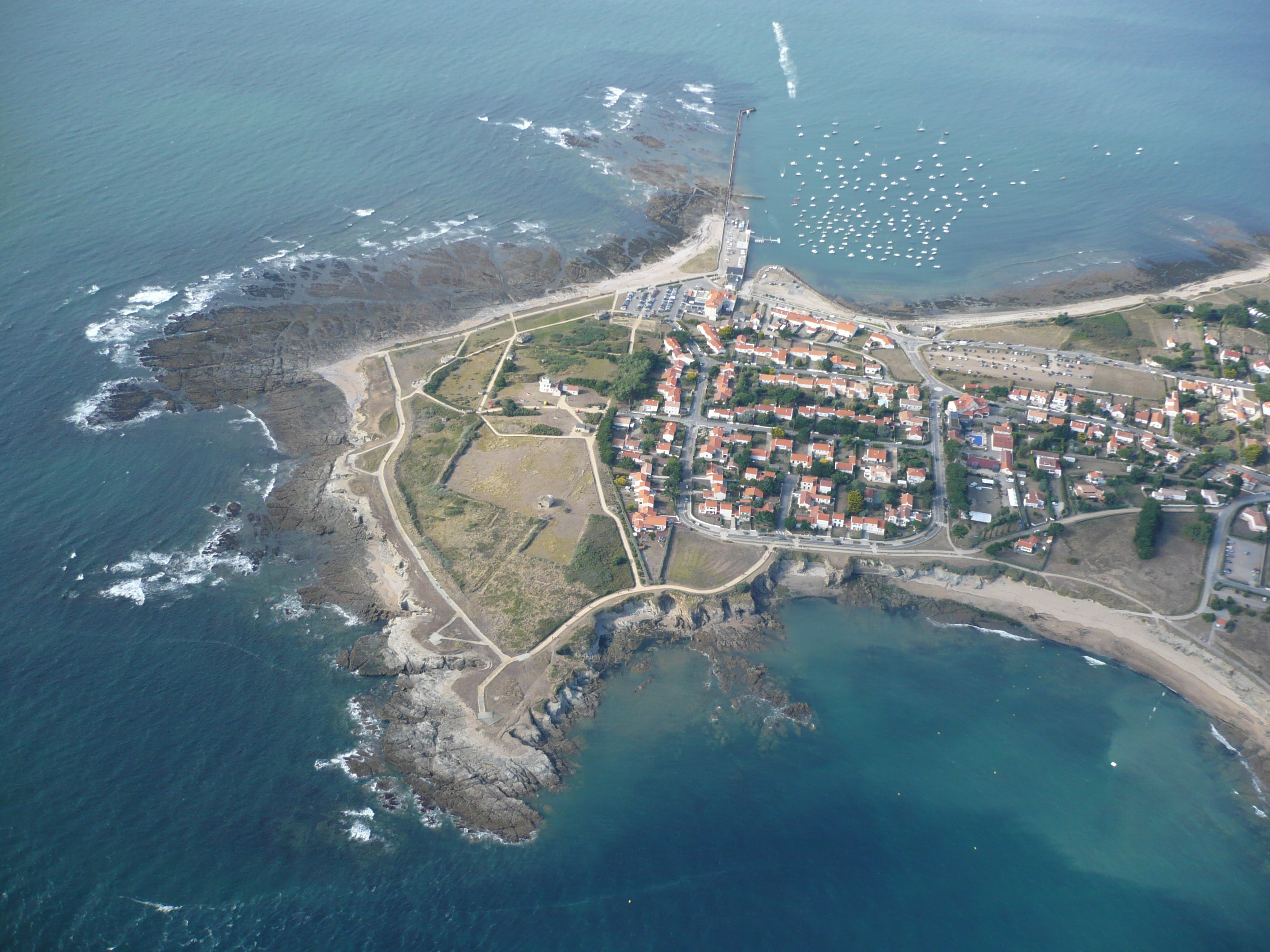

- Coordinates: 47.133611°N 2.245833°W

The Saint Gildas Point (French: Pointe Saint-Gildas, Breton: Beg Gweltaz) is a rocky point located on the Côte de Jade, in the far west of the Pays de Retz, in the municipality of Préfailles (Loire-Atlantique), France. The point lies at the south of the Loire estuary and the port of Saint-Nazaire lies on the opposite, north, bank. The Baie de Bourgneuf and island of Noirmoutier lie to the south.

== Toponymy ==
It owes its present name to Saint Gildas who landed in the sixth century. It was formerly known as "Terra de Chevesché", "Pointe de Chevesché" or "Pointe de Chevêché" until 1750. The term 'Chevesché' is a deformation of chevecier-chef, which formerly designated in ecclesiastical terminology the one who supervised the 'chevet' (apse or chancel) of a church and who, by extension, had custody of the treasury. This religious dignitary who received the income from an abbey (in this case that of Pornic ), lived in a 'chefferie'.

== Activities ==
A summer tourist destination (300,000 visitors per year), the point hosts some facilities for holiday-makers. Features include:

- a port housing fishing and pleasure boats (250 moorings including 3 for fishing boats), managed by the municipality;
- a municipal sailing school;
- a nautical jet-ski base;
- a museum space housed in the old semaphore transformed lighthouse in the middle of twentieth century (now automated);

hotels, campsites, and restaurants.

== World War II ==
During the Battle of France, many allied troops were evacuating via the port of Saint-Nazaire. The Pointe Saint-Gildas overlooks the sea where, on 17 June 1940, the RMS Lancastria was sunk with huge loss of lives. A monument and information panel near the main car park commemorates this tragic event.

Soon after, the Germans set up a major submarine base in Saint-Nazaire at the same time as the defences intended to ensure its protection. This defence was assigned to the MAA 280 (Marine Artillerie Abteilung), responsible for prohibiting entry the port of Saint-Nazaire and the mouth of the Loire.

The MAA 280 had 5 batteries, one of which, the fifth, was located on Pointe Saint-Gildas. This battery had two establishments, one on the Saint-Gildas point armed with four 75mm guns and a heavy battery armed with two 240mm guns located above the Raize beach.

These two guns were old pieces of railed artillery used in the First World War. The installation was made at a fixed position with a cannon at the top of the Chemin de la Raize and another halfway down to the sea. The entrance to the known shelters was located at the level of second cannon. Referred to as the “underground hospital”, these shelters were in fact a network of underground bunkers, comprising an infirmary, a radio control post, and a logistics command centre.

Most of the above-ground features are still very visible and some are open for public access. The subterranean shelters, located under what is now the Eléovic campsite mobile home area, are not publicly accessible. The rest of the barracks, as well as the commander's accommodation, were on the site of the campsite.

Following the Normandy landings and Operation Cobra, the area remained under German occupation within the Saint-Nazaire pocket and was not liberated until its surrender on 11 May 1945.

== Environment ==
Much of the coastal area of Pointe Saint-Gildas was declared a Regional Nature Reserve in 2014. The reserve has been the subject of a major rehabilitation program, in order to reduce the gradual destruction of the biotope by tourist activity. Numerous marked paths have been defined and the moor has been reseeded and stabilized.

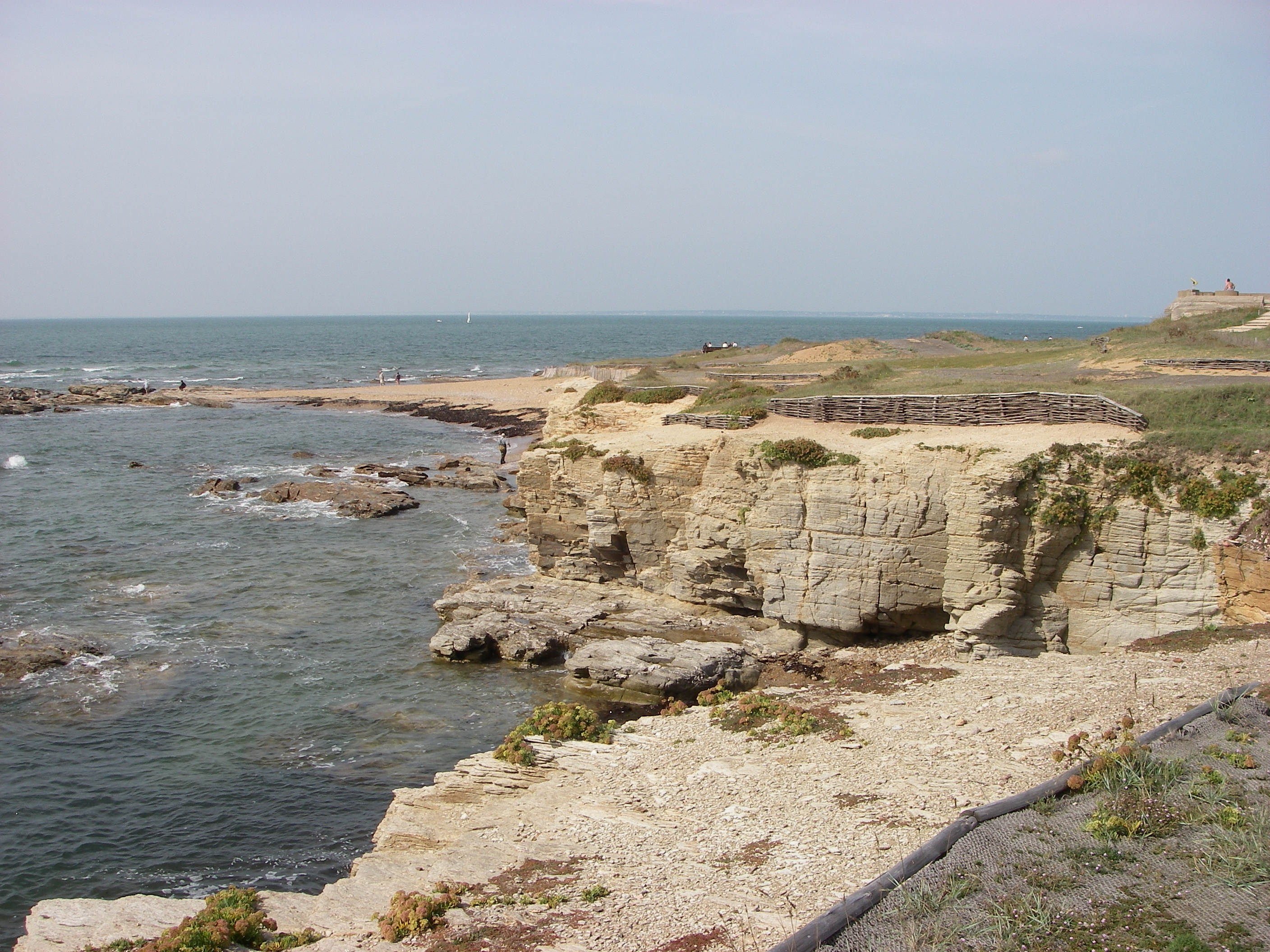
Pointe Saint Gildas in Loire-Atlantique.

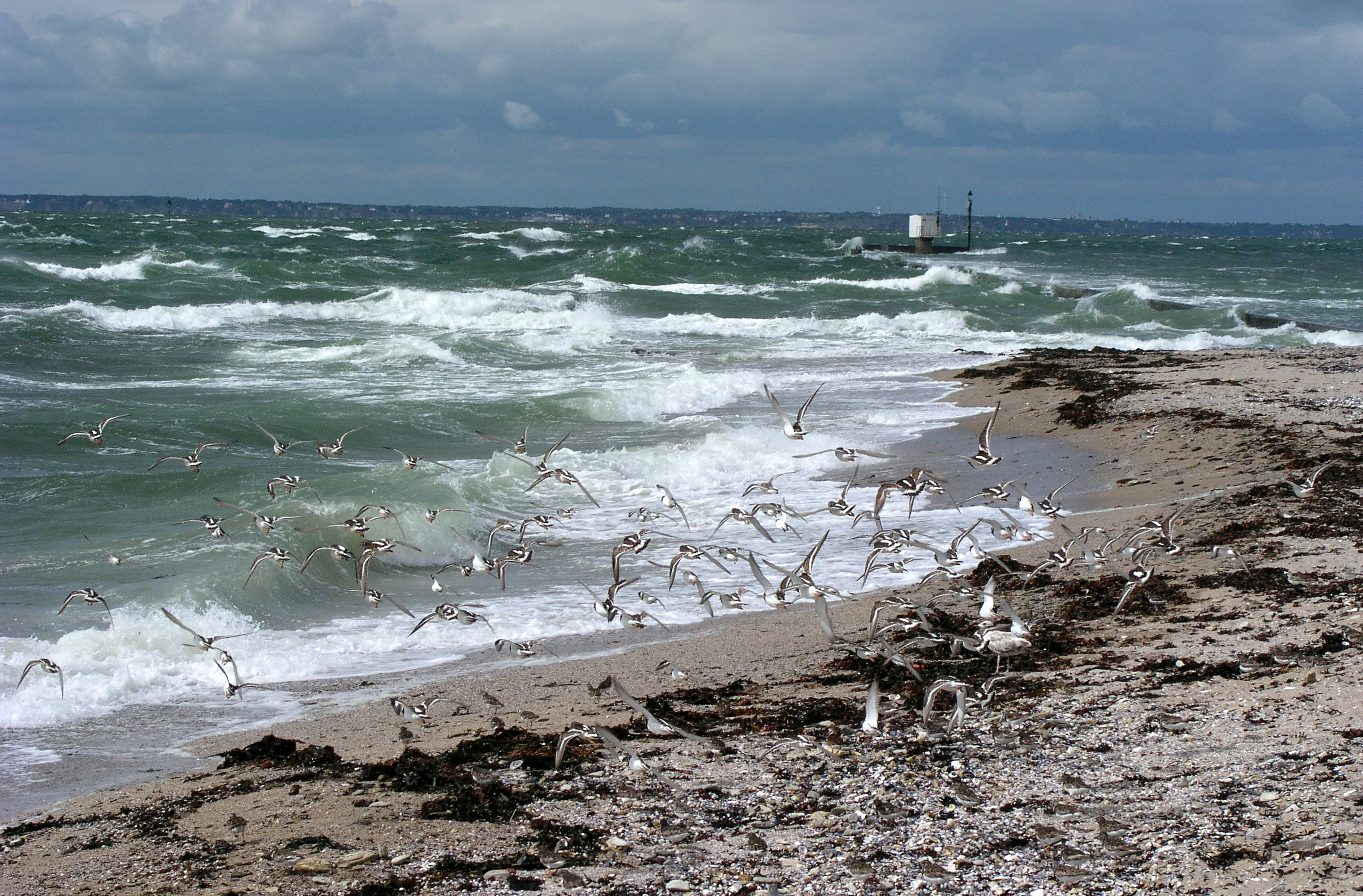
Pointe de Saint-Gildas, Préfailles, Loire-Atlantique.
