= Puebla de Don Fadrique =

- city
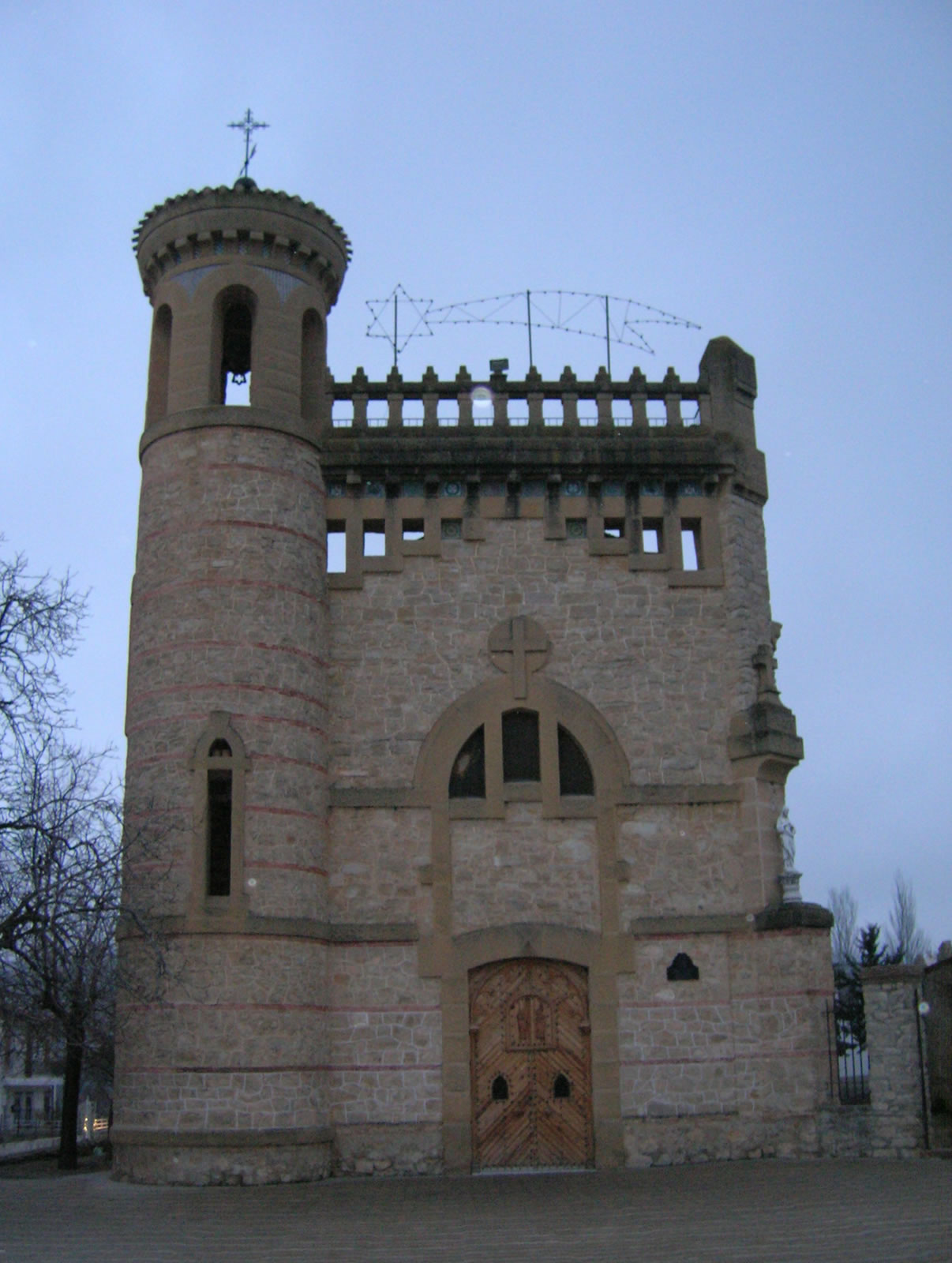

- Coat of arms

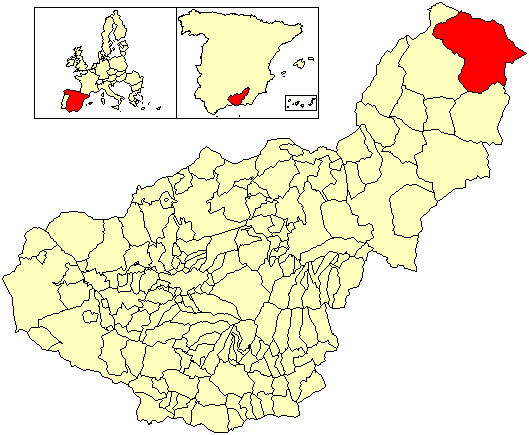
- Location of Puebla de Don Fadrique
- Coordinates: 37°58′N 2°26′W
- Country: Spain
- Province: Granada
- Municipality: Puebla de Don Fadrique

Area
  - Total: 522 km^{2} (202 sq mi)
- Elevation: 1,164 m (3,819 ft)

Population (2025-01-01)
  - Total: 2,195
  - Density: 4.20/km^{2} (10.9/sq mi)
- Time zone: UTC+1 (CET)
  - Summer (DST): UTC+2 (CEST)

Puebla de Don Fadrique is a municipality located in the province of Granada, Spain. According to the 2007 census (INE), the city has a population of 2,565 inhabitants.

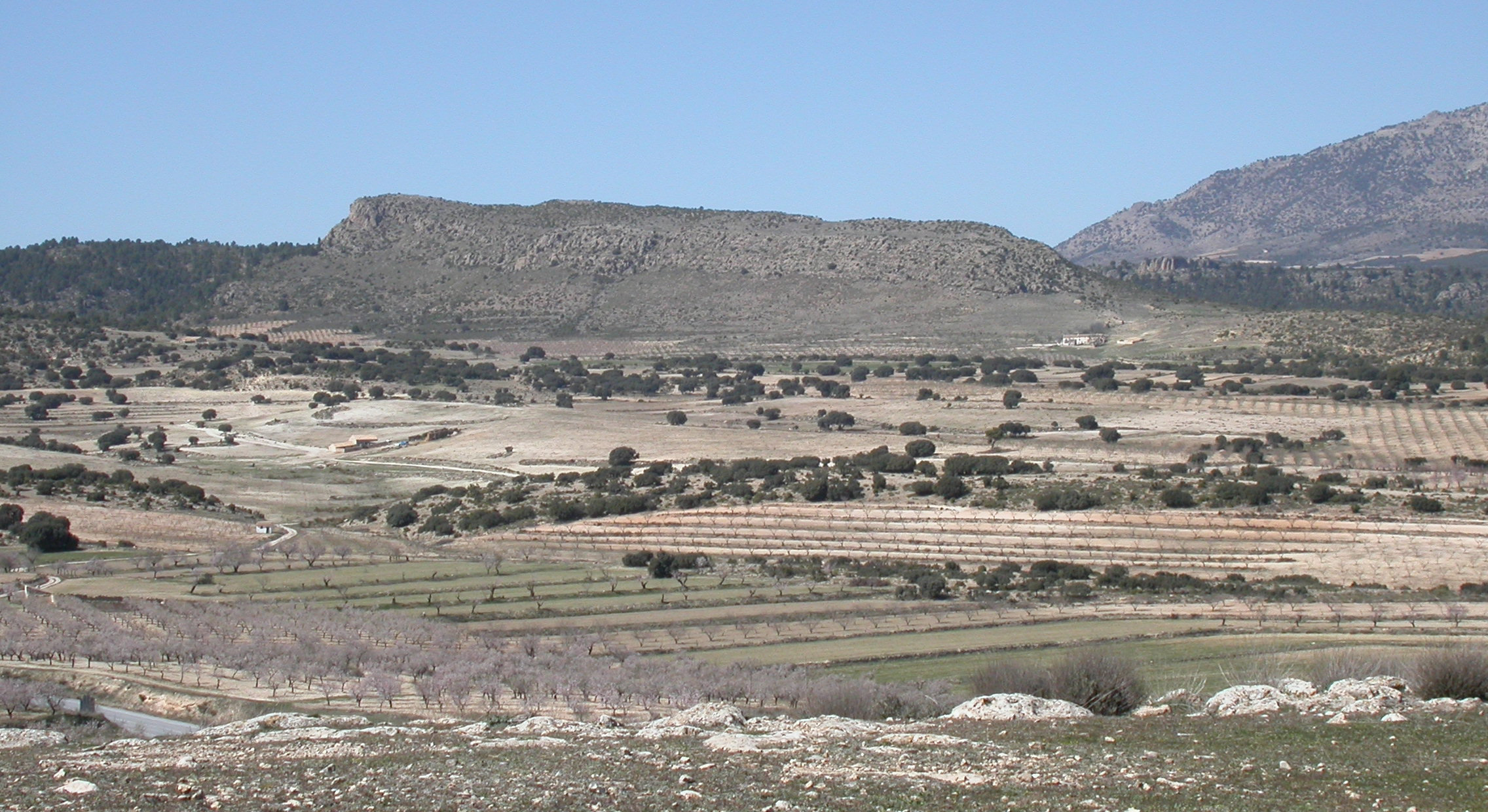
Molata de Casa Vieja; ruins of an important ancient Iberian village in Almaciles.

== Villages ==
- Puebla de Don Fadrique
- Almaciles

== See also ==
- List of municipalities in Granada
