= Lenie =

Lenie may refer to:

Places

- Lenie, Albania, a municipality in Albania
- Lenie (mountain), massif in Albania
- Lenie, Scotland, a hamlet in Scotland
- Lenie Passage in Antarctica
- Lenie Wielkie a village in Poland

First name

- Lenie Dijkstra (born 1967), Dutch racing cyclist
- Lenie Gerrietsen (born 1930), Dutch Olympic gymnast
- Lenie 't Hart (born 1941), Dutch animal rights activist
- Lenie van der Hoorn (born 1948), Dutch speed skater
- Lenie Lanting-Keller (1925–1995), Dutch diver
- Lenie de Nijs (born 1939), Dutch swimmer
- Lenie Onzia (born 1989), Belgian football player
