= Captain Pieter J. Lenie Base =

Lenie Station
- Antarctic base
- Captain Pieter J. Lenie Field Station
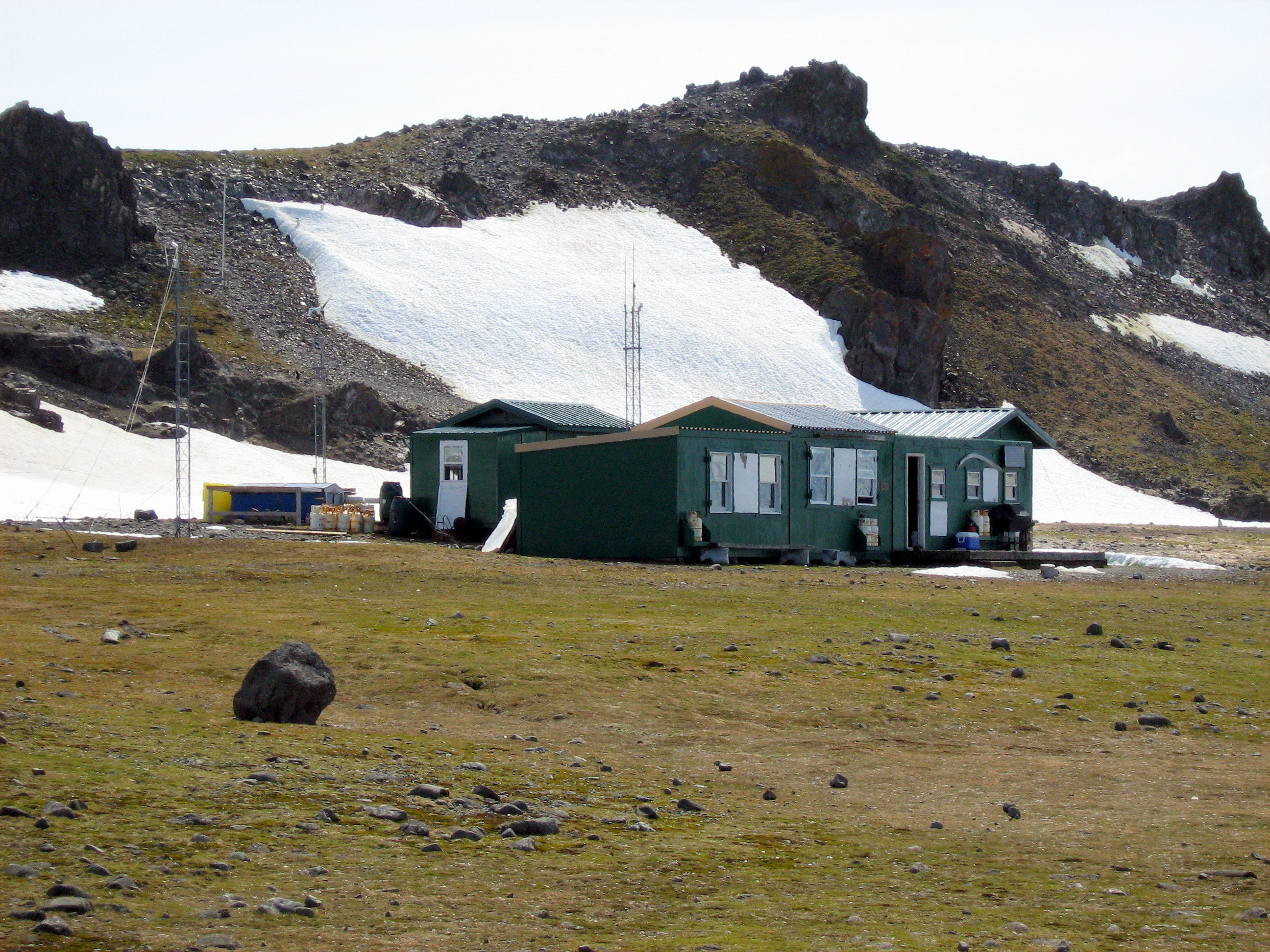
- Copacabana Field Station hut
- Nickname: "Copa" Copacabana Field Station
- Location of Lenie Station in Antarctica
- Coordinates: 62°10′42″S 58°26′45″W
- Country: United States
- Location in Antarctica: Admiralty Bay; King George Island; South Shetland Islands
- Administered by: United States Antarctic Program
- Established: 1 January 1985
- Named after: Captain Pieter J. Lenie
- Elevation: 33 ft (10 m)

Population (2018)
  - Summer: 2
  - Winter: 0
- Time zone: UTC-3 (EST)
  - Summer (DST): UTC-2 (EDT)
- Type: Seasonal
- Period: Summer
- Status: Operational
- Activities: Penguins monitoring
- Facilities: List: Main house; Technical staff house; Radio Antenna

The Captain Pieter J. Lenie Base is an Antarctic summer base operated by the United States located at Copacabana Beach, Admiralty Bay (King George Island). About two kilometers northwest of this base is the Polish research station Arctowski. Pieter J. Lenie Base, also known as Copa (short for Copacabana), consists of three small buildings at the foot of Rescuers Hills, near Llano Point.

The field station is located at a latitude of 62° 10′ S and at a longitude of 58° 28′ W, at Antarctic Specially Protected Area (ASPA) 128. It was originally set up in 1978 as a refuge hut, and was substantially upgraded and formally named for Pieter J. Lenie (captain of the American Antarctic research ship RV Hero) in 1985.

Originally established for the long-term study of Pygoscelis penguins that nest nearby, scientific research done at the base is focused on population and diet monitoring of the Adélie penguin and Gentoo penguin colonies on the beach, as well as second-hand monitoring of Krill populations in the adjacent waters.

== See also ==
- List of Antarctic research stations
- List of Antarctic field camps
