= Stróżewo =

Stróżewo may refer to the following places:

- Stróżewo, Lipno County in Kuyavian-Pomeranian Voivodeship (north-central Poland)
- Stróżewo, Radziejów County in Kuyavian-Pomeranian Voivodeship (north-central Poland)
- Stróżewo, Masovian Voivodeship (east-central Poland)
- Stróżewo, Greater Poland Voivodeship (west-central Poland)
- Stróżewo, West Pomeranian Voivodeship (north-west Poland)
