= Lenie 't Hart =

Dutch animal rights activist

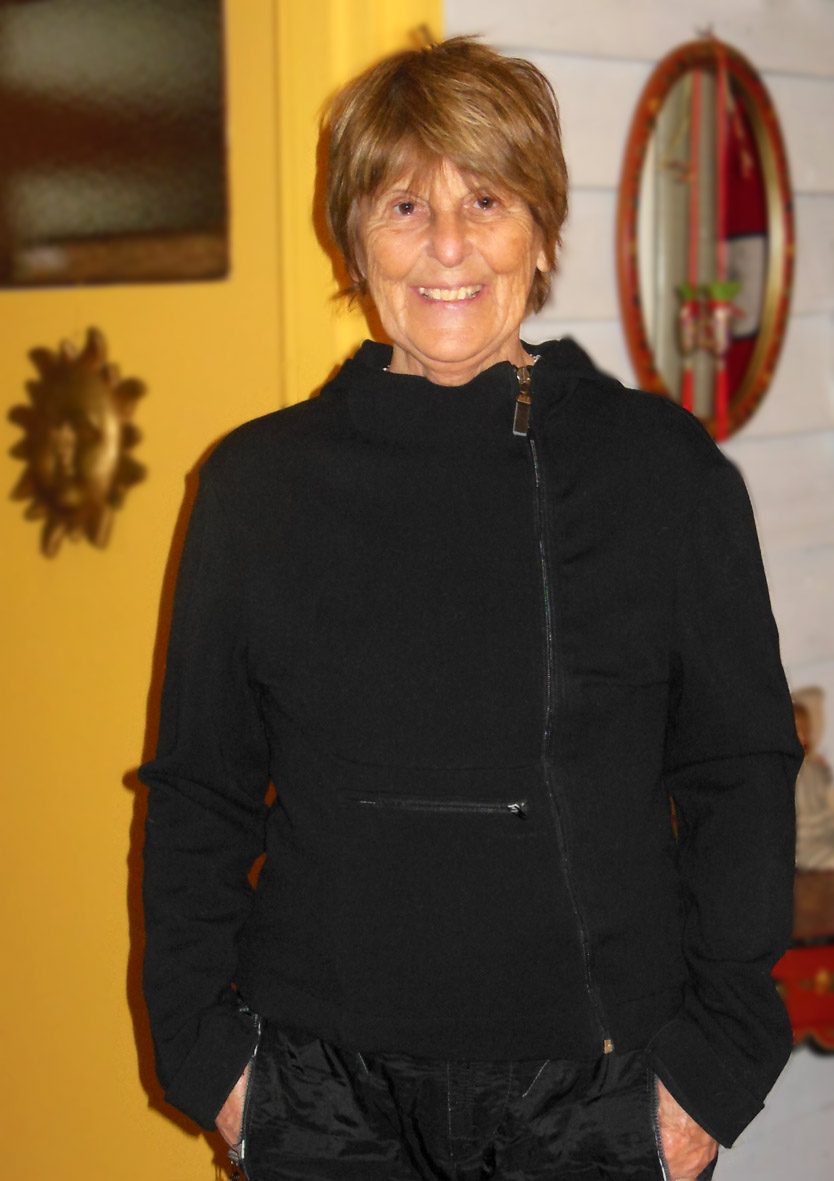
- Born: Leentje Godlieb; September 16, 1941 (age 84); Farmsum, Netherlands
- Occupations: Animal caretaker Founder of the Pieterburen Seal Rehabilitation and Research Centre

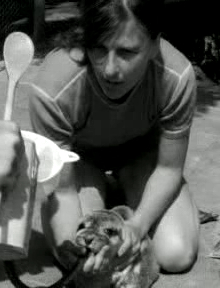
Lenie 't Hart at the seal rehabilitation centre in Pieterburen (1972)

Lenie 't Hart (born Leentje Godlieb; born September 16, 1941 in Farmsum) is a Dutch animal caretaker and animal rights activist. In 1971, she founded the Seal Rehabilitation and Research Centre in Pieterburen, Groningen but was forced to leave when her strong opposition to new, scientifically-based policies about seal care put her at odds with the centre's staff as well as the government.

== Seal rescue ==
't Hart started in 1971 with one lost seal in a tub in her own back-garden. In the beginning the care was only for seal puppies who had lost their mother, the "howlers", as a young seal pup can not survive without his mother.

In 2014 the people working at the Seal Rehabilitation Centre forced 't Hart to stop her activities at the centre, as she wouldn't accept the new scientifically based policy on treating injured seals and intervened too much with the people working there. Throughout her life, in relation to the rehabilitation of seals, Lenie provided much valuable support and advice to a multitude of Seal Rescue facilities throughout our planet. Without her vision, many seals would not have survived. In the proceeding years after she left the Zeehondencreche, Lenie and her colleagues have been subject in several investigations by the Dutch authorities for continuing to rehabilitate seals.
