= Gmina Dobrzyń nad Wisłą =

Gmina Dobrzyń nad Wisłą Dobrzyń nad Wisłą Commune
- Gmina
- Flag Coat of arms
- Interactive map of Gmina Dobrzyń nad Wisłą
- Coordinates (Dobrzyń nad Wisłą): 52°38′16″N 19°19′17″E
- Country: Poland
- Voivodeship: Kuyavian-Pomeranian
- County: Lipno
- Seat: Dobrzyń nad Wisłą

Area
  - Total: 115.44 km^{2} (44.57 sq mi)

Population (2006)
  - Total: 7,943
  - Density: 68.81/km^{2} (178.2/sq mi)
  - Urban: 2,269
  - Rural: 5,674
- Website: http://dobrzyn.pl/

Gmina Dobrzyń nad Wisłą is an urban-rural gmina (administrative district) in Lipno County, Kuyavian-Pomeranian Voivodeship, in north-central Poland. Its seat is the town of Dobrzyń nad Wisłą, which lies approximately 26 kilometres (16 mi) south-east of Lipno and 65 km (40 mi) south-east of Toruń.

The gmina covers an area of 115.44 square kilometres (44.6 sq mi), and as of 2006 its total population is 7,943 (out of which the population of Dobrzyń nad Wisłą amounts to 2,269, and the population of the rural part of the gmina is 5,674).

== Villages ==
Apart from the town of Dobrzyń nad Wisłą, Gmina Dobrzyń nad Wisłą contains the villages and settlements of Bachorzewo, Chalin, Chalin-Kolonia, Dyblin, Glewo, Główczyn, Grochowalsk, Kamienica, Kisielewo, Kochoń, Krępa, Krojczyn, Lenie Wielkie, Michałkowo, Mokówko, Mokowo, Płomiany, Ruszkowo, Strachoń, Stróżewo, Szpiegowo, Tulibowo, Wierznica and Zbyszewo.

== Neighbouring gminas ==
Gmina Dobrzyń nad Wisłą is bordered by the gminas of Brudzeń Duży, Fabianki, Tłuchowo, Wielgie and Włocławek.
