= Szpiegowo =

- Village
- Location within Poland
- Coordinates: 52°42′N 19°14′E
- Country: Poland
- Voivodeship: Kuyavian-Pomeranian
- County: Lipno
- Gmina: Dobrzyń nad Wisłą

Szpiegowo [ʂpjɛˈɡɔvɔ] is a village in the administrative district of Gmina Dobrzyń nad Wisłą, within Lipno County, Kuyavian-Pomeranian Voivodeship, in north-central Poland.
