= Dyblin =

- Village
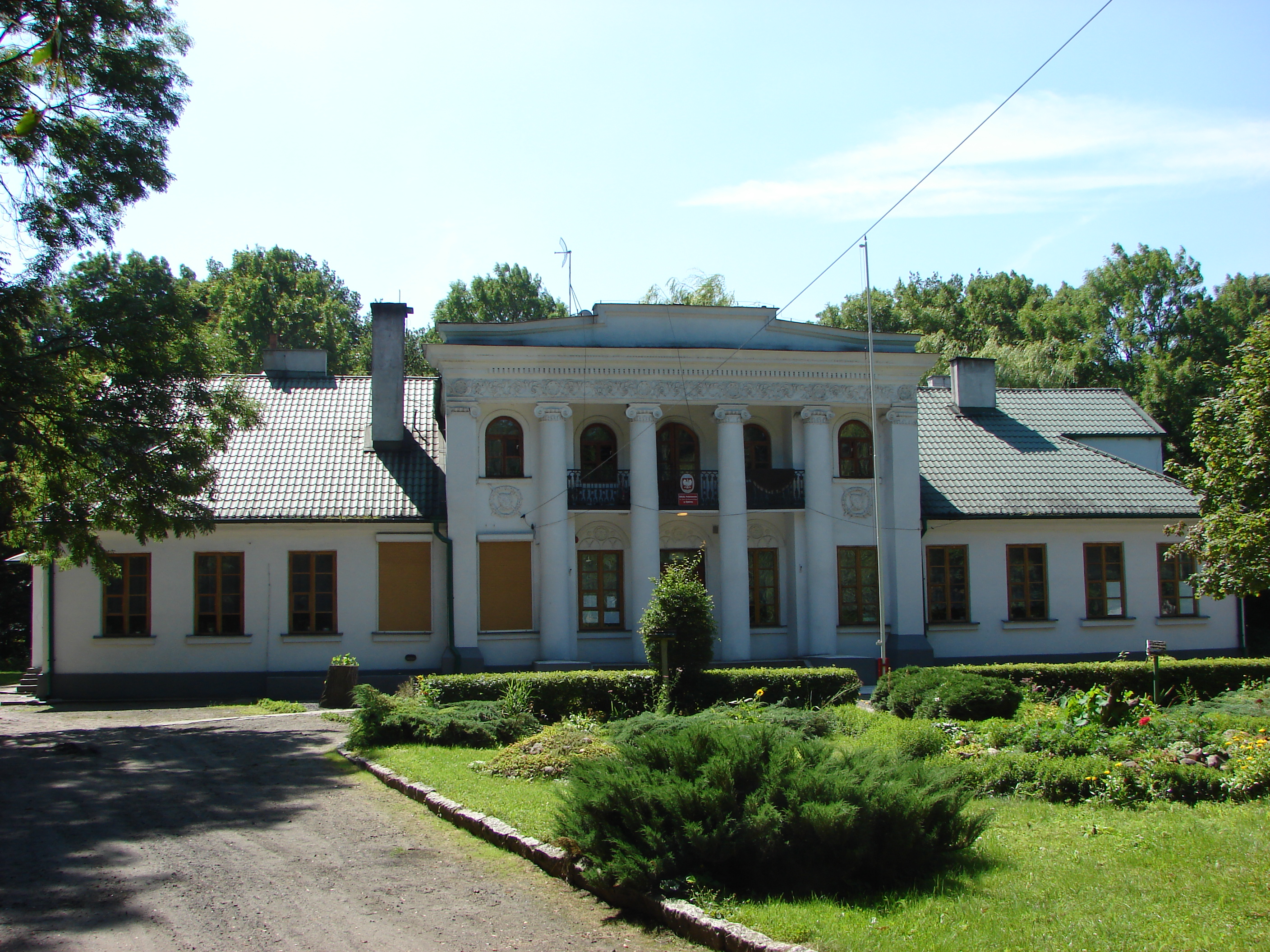
- Manor house, 19th century

- Location within Poland
- Coordinates: 52°40′34″N 19°16′25″E
- Country: Poland
- Voivodeship: Kuyavian-Pomeranian
- County: Lipno
- Gmina: Dobrzyń nad Wisłą

Dyblin [ˈdɨblin] is a village in the administrative district of Gmina Dobrzyń nad Wisłą, within Lipno County, Kuyavian-Pomeranian Voivodeship, in north-central Poland.
