= Kisielewo, Kuyavian-Pomeranian Voivodeship =

Kisielewo
- Village
- Location within Poland
- Coordinates: 52°41′59″N 19°15′34″E
- Country: Poland
- Voivodeship: Kuyavian-Pomeranian
- County: Lipno
- Gmina: Dobrzyń nad Wisłą

Kisielewo [kiɕɛˈlɛvɔ] is a village in the administrative district of Gmina Dobrzyń nad Wisłą, within Lipno County, Kuyavian-Pomeranian Voivodeship, in north-central Poland.
