= Pieterpad =

Walking route in the Netherlands

- Length: 498 km (309 mi)
- Location: Netherlands
- Trailheads: Pieterburen, Groningen; Maastricht, Limburg
- Use: Hiking
- Highest point: Schimmert, 135 m (443 ft)
- Difficulty: Easy
- Season: All year

The Pieterpad is a long distance walking route in the Netherlands. The trail runs 498 kilometres (309 mi) from Pieterburen, in the northern part of Groningen, south through the eastern part of the Netherlands to end just south of Maastricht, on the top of Mount Saint Peter (St Pietersberg), at a height of 109 metres (358 ft). The Pieterpad is one of the official Long Distance Paths in the Netherlands (Lange Afstand Wandelpad Nummer 9) and by far the most popular of its long distance walking routes. It is possible to walk the route in either direction, and throughout the year. It is well signposted, and is well served by public transport and accommodation throughout its length. The official guide book is in two volumes, Pieterburen-Vorden and Vorden-Maastricht. A dedicated website (in Dutch) also gives updated accommodation details. Although the walking is always easy and never remote, it is a varied and often beautiful walk, passing through woods, polders, heathland, and numerous small Dutch villages.

== History ==
The trail was the idea of Toos Goorhuis-Tjalsma (1915-2004) living in Tilburg, in the south of the Netherlands and her friend Bertje Jens (1913-2009) living in Groningen in the north of the Netherlands. They came up with the idea to design a rambling route between their hometowns, later re-organised between the far north to the far south. The route has been officially open since 1983.

== Stages ==
The route of the Pieterpad is described in the following stages:

1	Pieterburen	Winsum	12 km
2	Winsum	Groningen	19 km
3	Groningen	Zuidlaren	21 km
4	Zuidlaren	Rolde	18 km
5	Rolde	Schoonloo	18 km
6	Schoonloo	Sleen	24 km
7	Sleen	Coevorden	21 km
8	Coevorden	Hardenberg	19 km
9	Hardenberg	Ommen	21 km
10	Ommen	Hellendoorn	21 km
11	Hellendoorn	Holten	16 km
12	Holten	Laren	15 km
13	Laren	Vorden	13 km
14	Vorden	Zelhem	17 km
15	Zelhem	Braamt	18 km
16	Braamt	Millingen aan de Rijn	24 km
17	Millingen	Groesbeek	20 km
18	Groesbeek	Gennep	14 km
19	Gennep	Vierlingsbeek	19 km
20	Vierlingsbeek	Swolgen	22 km
21	Swolgen	Venlo	21 km
22	Venlo	Swalmen	23 km
23	Swalmen	Montfort	21 km
24	Montfort	Sittard	24 km
25	Sittard	Strabeek (Valkenburg)	22 km
26	Strabeek	Sint-Pietersberg	17 km

The Pieterpad connects to the international trails E9 at its northern end in Pieterburen and the GR5 at its southern end and crosses the E11 in Oldenzaal and the E8 in Nijmegen. It follows the European walking GR5, which is also part of trail E2. The GR5, which runs through the Ardennes to Nice and the French Alps, is one of the most popular international trails for hikers.

== Gallery ==
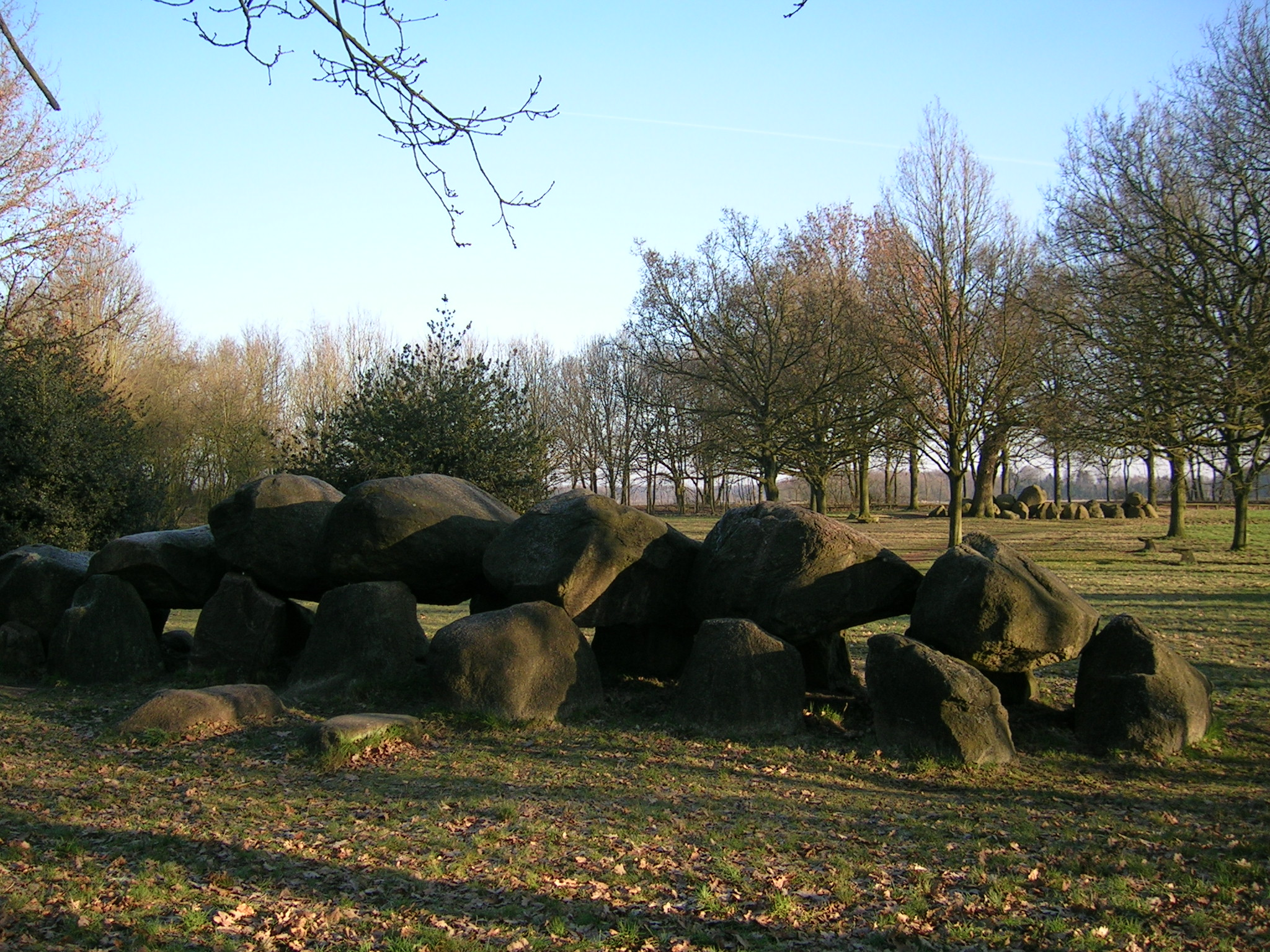
Hunebedden near Rolde

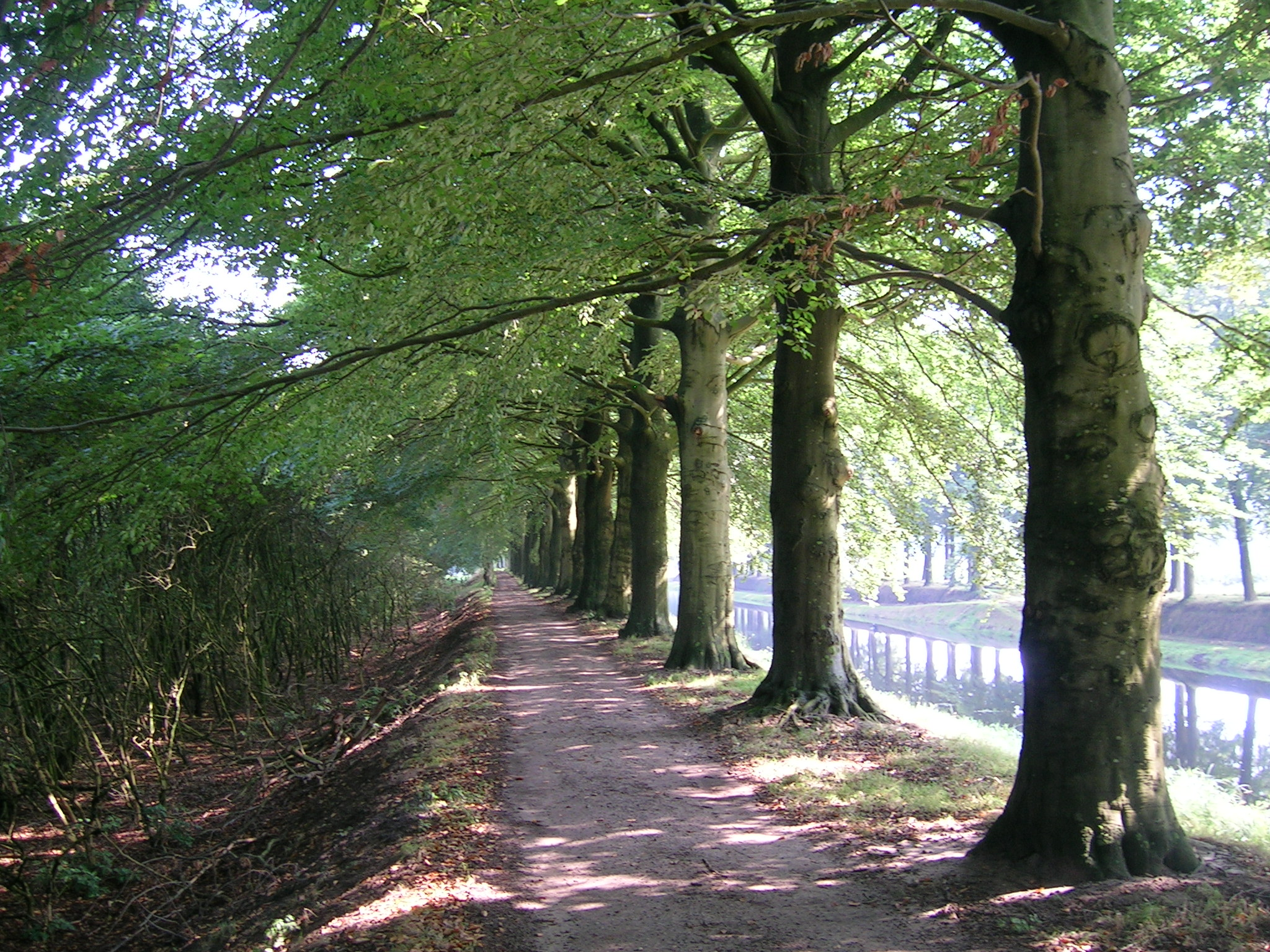
Hellendoorn to Laren

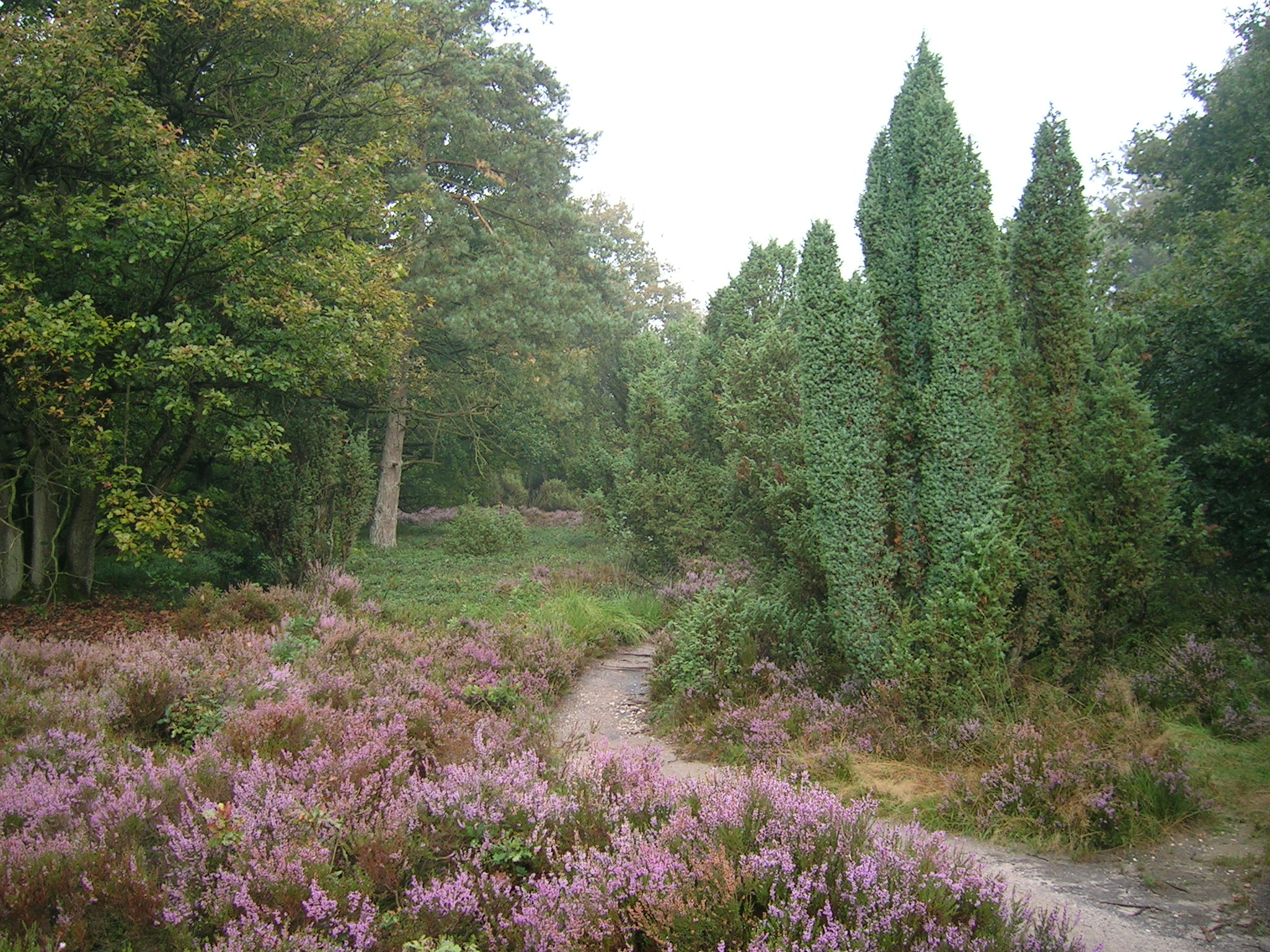
Near Laren

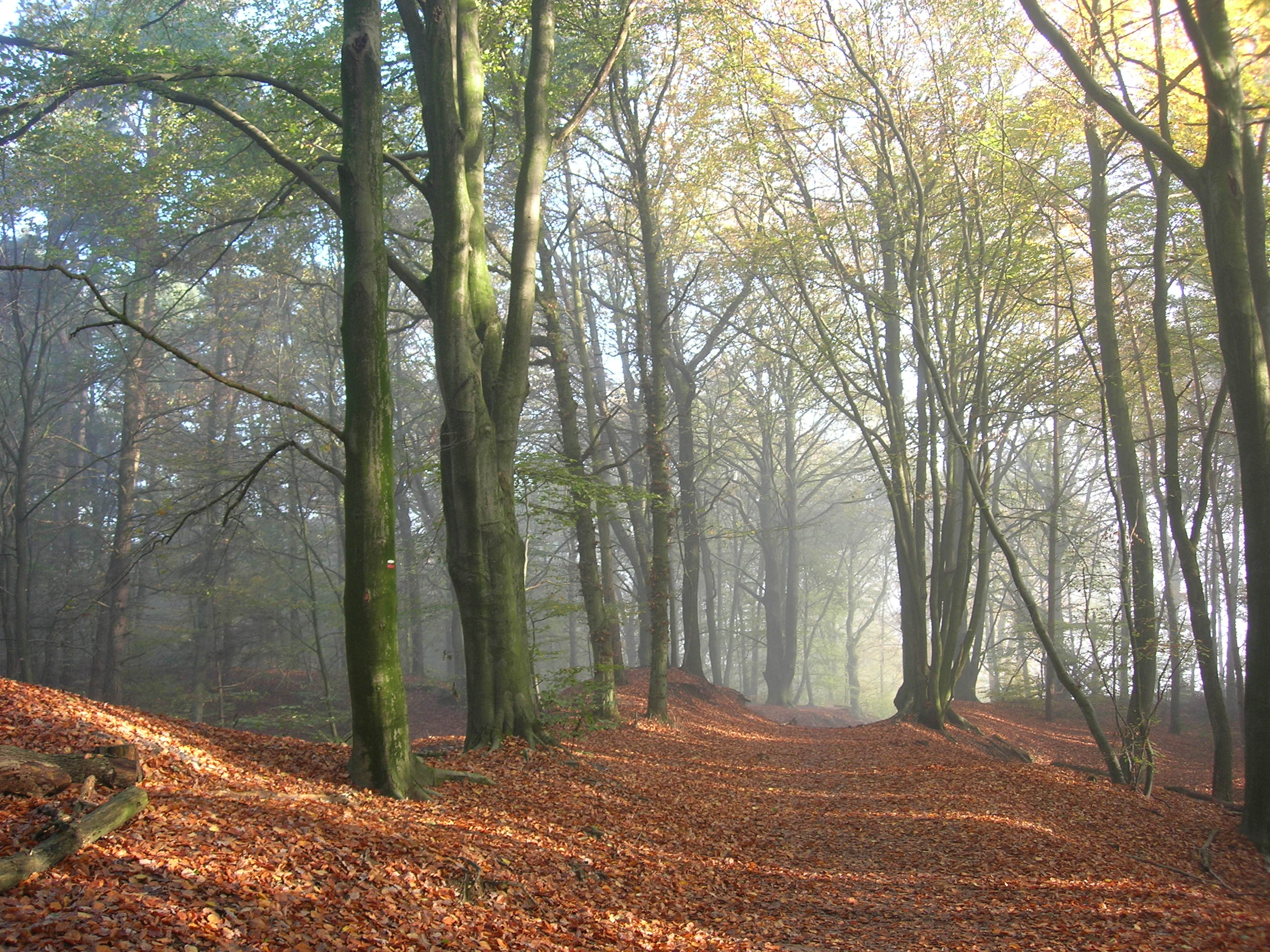
Near Doetinchem

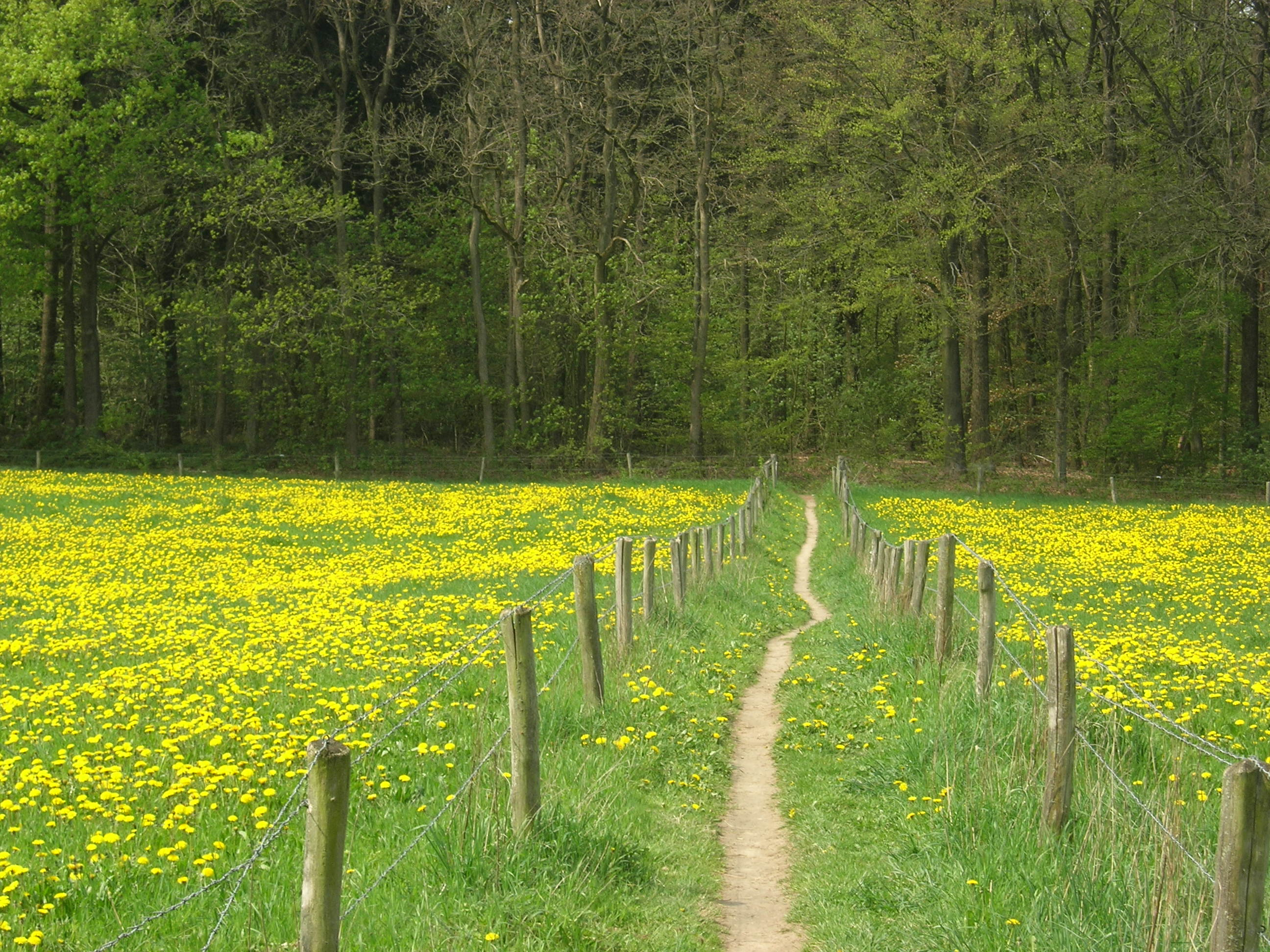
Groesbeek to Gennep

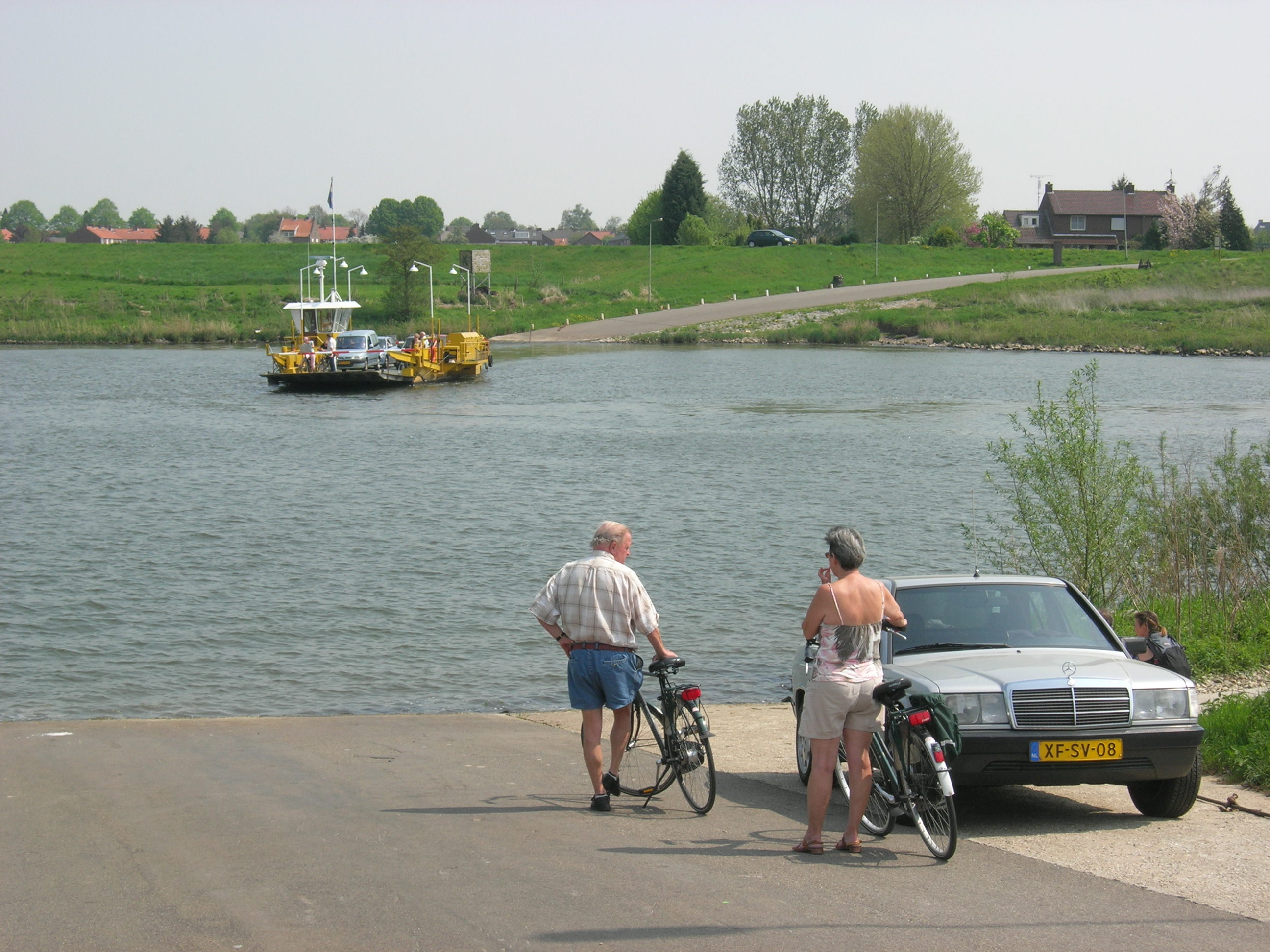
Maas at Grubbenvorst
