= Seal Rehabilitation and Research Centre =

Pinniped rehabilitation and research center in the Netherlands

Coordinates: 53°24′30.52″N 6°11′53.87″E

- Stichting Zeehondencentrum Pieterburen
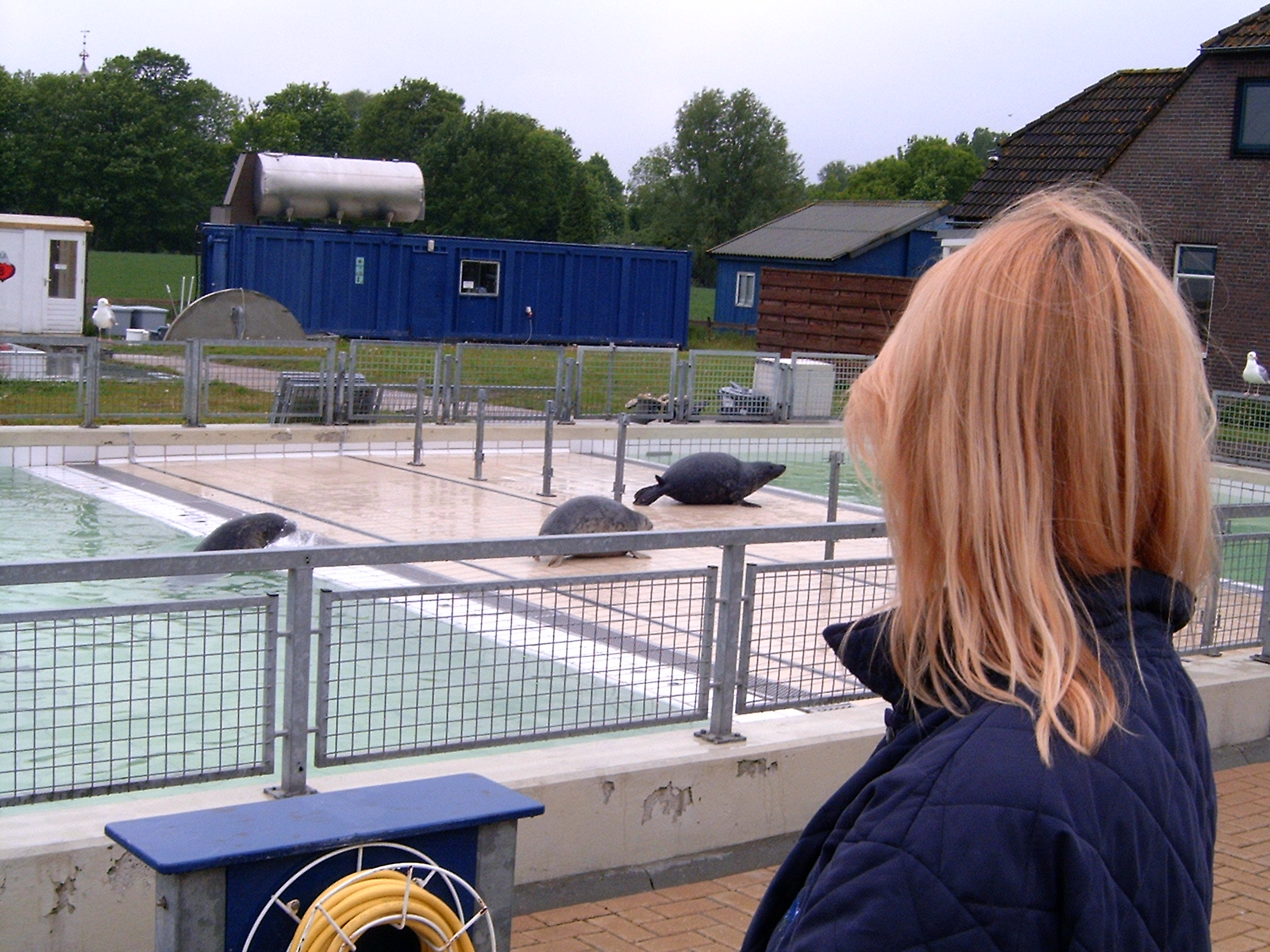
- Abbreviation: SRRC
- Established: 21 December 1971; 54 years ago
- Founder: Lenie 't Hart
- Location: Lauwersoog, the Netherlands
- Managing director: Niek Kuizenga
- Operational director: Bas Wemmenhove
- Website: www.zeehondencentrum.nl/en/
- Formerly called: Zeehondencrèche Pieterburen (until 2006; 2014–2016); Zeehondencrèche Lenie 't Hart (2006–2014)

YouTube information
- Channel: Zeehondencentrum
- Years active: 2013–present
- Genres: Nonprofits; Activism
- Subscribers: 416 thousand
- Views: 102.2 million
- Last updated: 15 October 2026

The Seal Rehabilitation and Research Centre (SRRC; Dutch: Stichting Zeehondencentrum Pieterburen; lit. 'Pieterburen Seal Centre Foundation') is located in the village of Lauwersoog in Groningen, the Netherlands. Until 2016, it was called a 'seal crèche' (zeehondencrèche), because it had mainly cared for young orphaned pinnipeds. In the years since then, sick and weakened seals of all ages are taken in for treatment and then released. The centre is committed to the management and conservation of the seal habitat, trains people to work with these marine mammals, conducts research, and provides education.

The SRRC was located in the village of Pieterburen until 2025 and has since been part of the Wadden Sea World Heritage Centre in the harbour of Lauwersoog.

== History ==
=== 20th century ===
In Pieterburen, pinnipeds had been cared for on the initiative of Lenie 't Hart since the first seal, a young male named Loeskus, arrived on 21 December 1971. This was a continuation of the efforts of René and Anneke Wentzel, who had rehabilitated orphaned seals in the nearby village of Uithuizen since 1961. In 1952, Gerrit de Haan and Annie de Haan-Langeveld had founded the first European seal sanctuary in De Koog as part of the Texels Museum, a venture that became Ecomare in 1986.

The SRRC, located at 't Hart's home, had been expanded several times. Construction on the final building officially began on 7 September 1978. VARA radio and television presenter Bert Garthoff, known for hosting the popular radio programme Weer of geen weer, laid the foundation stone. He was asked to do so because he had been one of the first Dutch media personalities to call attention to environmental issues through his work. Prince Bernhard of Lippe-Biesterfeld, a founder and the inaugural president of the World Wide Fund for Nature, was present for the opening of four additional outdoor pools, quarantine units, a public information hall, and a video room in 1993.

=== 21st century ===
On 16 September 2006, Lenie 't Hart's 65th birthday, the Ministry of Agriculture, Nature and Food Quality awarded her its silver honorary medal for her tireless efforts for marine mammals and the Wadden Sea area over the years. In honor of 't Hart and on the occasion of its 35th anniversary, the 'seal crèche' was renamed Zeehondencrèche Lenie 't Hart that same day.

In 2011, the year she turned 70 years old, "seal mother" Lenie 't Hart announced that she would be stepping down as director of the SRRC. Eventually, Niek Kuizenga assumed leadership. 't Hart remained connected to the centre as a volunteer and ambassador, but she grew strongly opposed to the introduction of new, science-based policies for seal rescue and treatment that were based on recent knowledge and experience, and were considered appropriate for the current seal population of the Wadden Sea.

In January 2014, the simmering conflict between Lenie 't Hart and the centre came to a boil. The management and employees wanted to accommodate seals under different conditions, no longer to immediately remove pups from their mothers as was the case under 't Hart, and to have a shorter care period for the seals if the physical condition of the animals allowed it. The use of antibiotics in the animals taken in had to be reduced to prevent antibiotic resistance. This was very much against 't Hart's vision, who believed that all animals should be treated preventively with antibiotics. A central point of contention was the question of whether all juvenile pinnipeds lying on the beach required rescuing. According to Lenie 't Hart, a seal pup on the beach is always in need of help, while the management and employees disputed this: according to new scientific insights, seal mothers sometimes leave their young alone for an entire day to get food at sea. This put the management in direct conflict with the supervisory board set up by 't Hart. The crisis publicly erupted after Lenie 't Hart appointed a personal friend, TROS luminary Wibo van de Linde, as chairman of the supervisory board and announced through the media that the new reception policy was illegal. The staff then demanded more policy freedom and, when they were not given this, went on strike.

After the supervisory board was replaced in February 2014, 't Hart cut ties with the centre. Several attempts by Lenie 't Hart to obtain a severance payment of €150,000 (US$199,275) came to nothing. The Dutch name of the SRRC was temporarily changed back to Zeehondencrèche Pieterburen and became Zeehondencentrum Pieterburen on 1 July 2016.

Given years of intensive use, overdue maintenance, and the costs associated with fully renovating and future-proofing the facilities in Pieterburen, construction of the Wadden Sea World Heritage Centre (Dutch: Werelderfgoedcentrum Waddenzee, WEC) in Lauwersoog commenced in 2023. At this new location, designed by the Danish architect Dorte Mandrup, the SRRC would have the space to combine education and scientific research regarding the entire Wadden Sea ecosystem with rehabilitation activities. Furthermore, the harbour of Lauwersoog offers direct access to open water, meaning that heading out to sea and releasing animals would no longer require a half-hour journey. The centre in Pieterburen closed its doors on 5 January 2025 and the WEC opened to the public on 25 April 2025.

On 12 October 2026, the board of the WEC announced that it expected to file for bankruptcy within two weeks, as anticipated financial support from the municipal council of Het Hogeland and the Groningen States-Provincial had failed to materialize. Partly because the construction of the new facility had proven more expensive than estimated, the organisation faced significant financial difficulties, with its debt at that time reaching €2.6 million (US$2.9 million). The WEC stated that the closure of the centre would result in the loss of approximately forty jobs, adding that the rescue and rehabilitation of seals in distress would be jeopardized. In response to this news, a crowdfunding campaign and an online petition were launched to save the centre. The crowdfunding effort raised more than €700,000 (US$784,907) for the WEC in just two days.

== Activities ==
The centre has evolved from a simple 'crèche' for young seals to a scientific research-based seal hospital, with accompanying facilities such as quarantine units, a laboratory, a chemist, and modern research facilities.

Hundreds of seals are cared for annually. The center rescues seals that have been injured by boats or fishing nets and those that have been sickened due to water pollution. The center also rescues orphaned pups. All rehabilitated seals are released into the wild after their rehabilitation period, which lasts from several weeks to a maximum of six months. None of the animals remain in captivity and none of the seals are bred. The center also collects pieces of fishing nets that float in the sea and injure the animals. The center is open to visitors daily.

== Gallery ==
=== Images ===
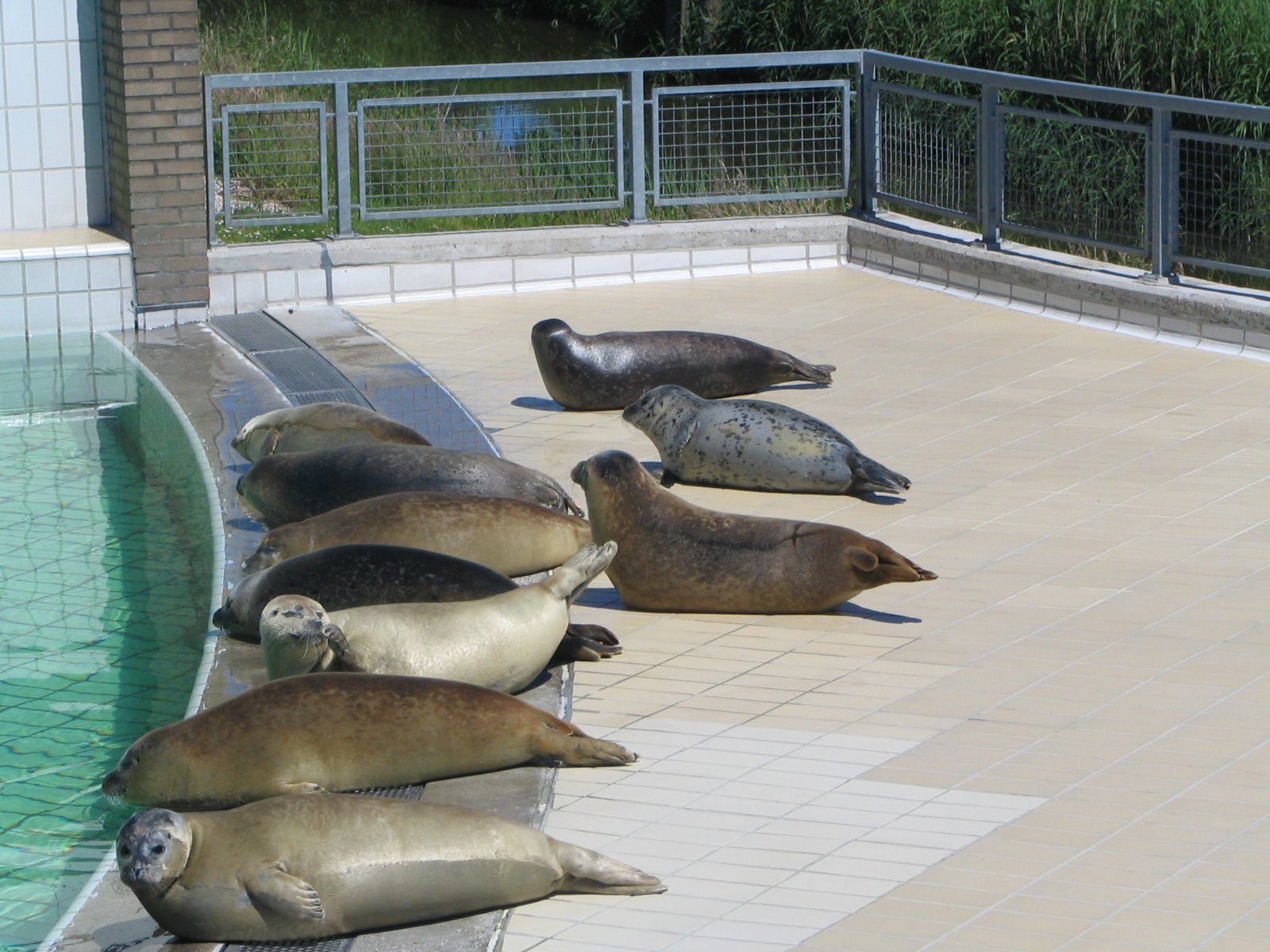

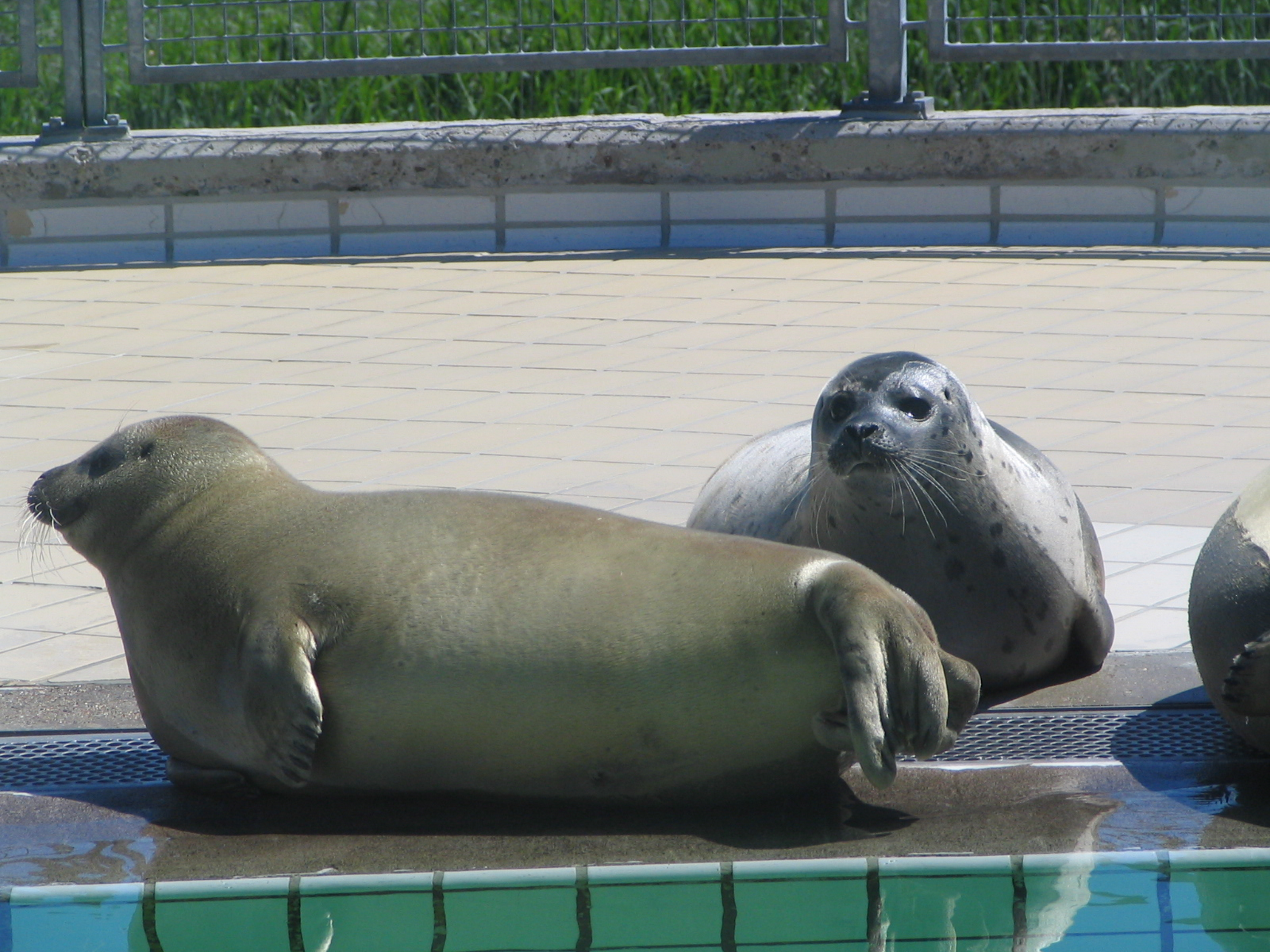

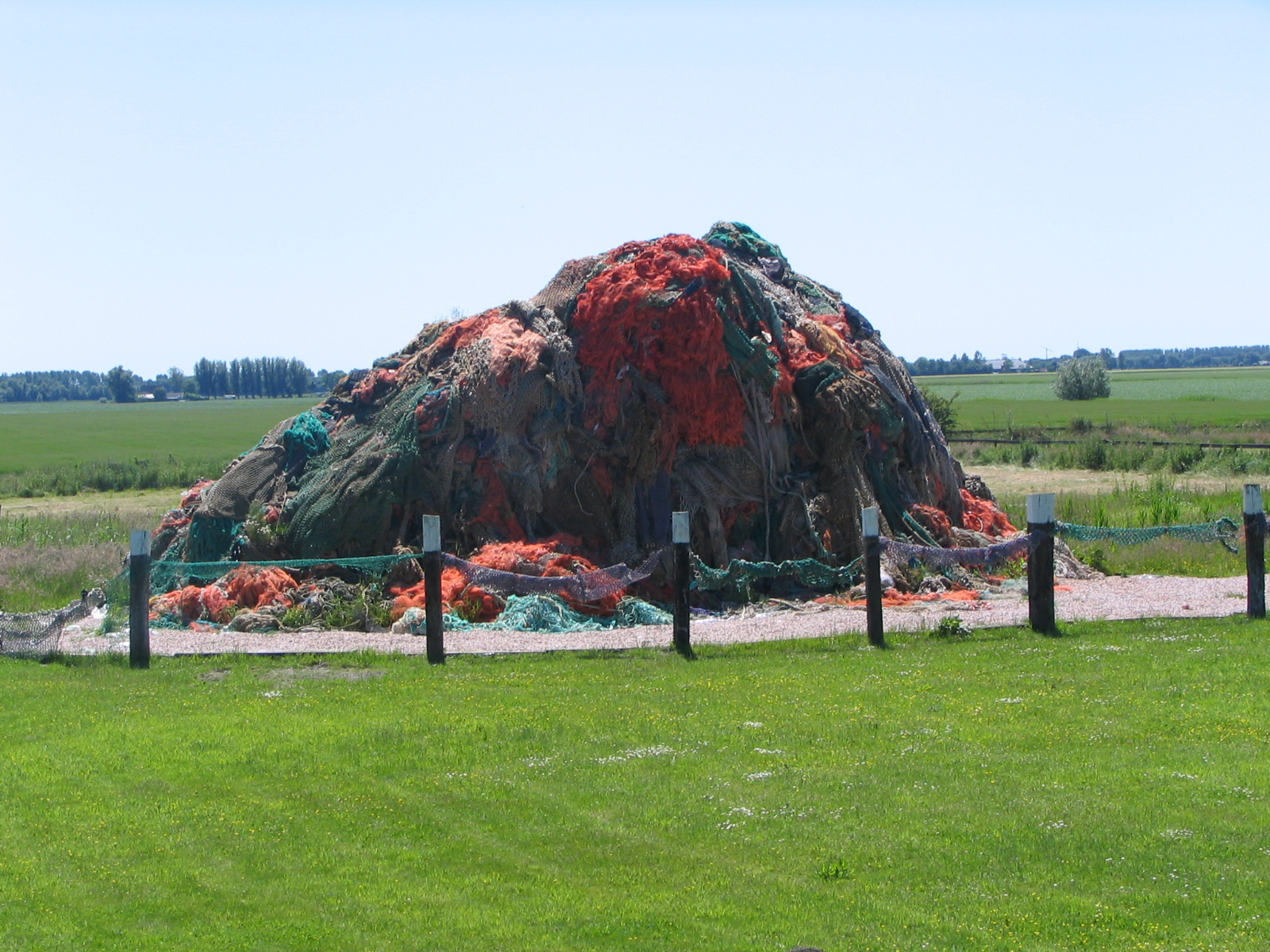
Mount of fishing nets recovered from the North Sea

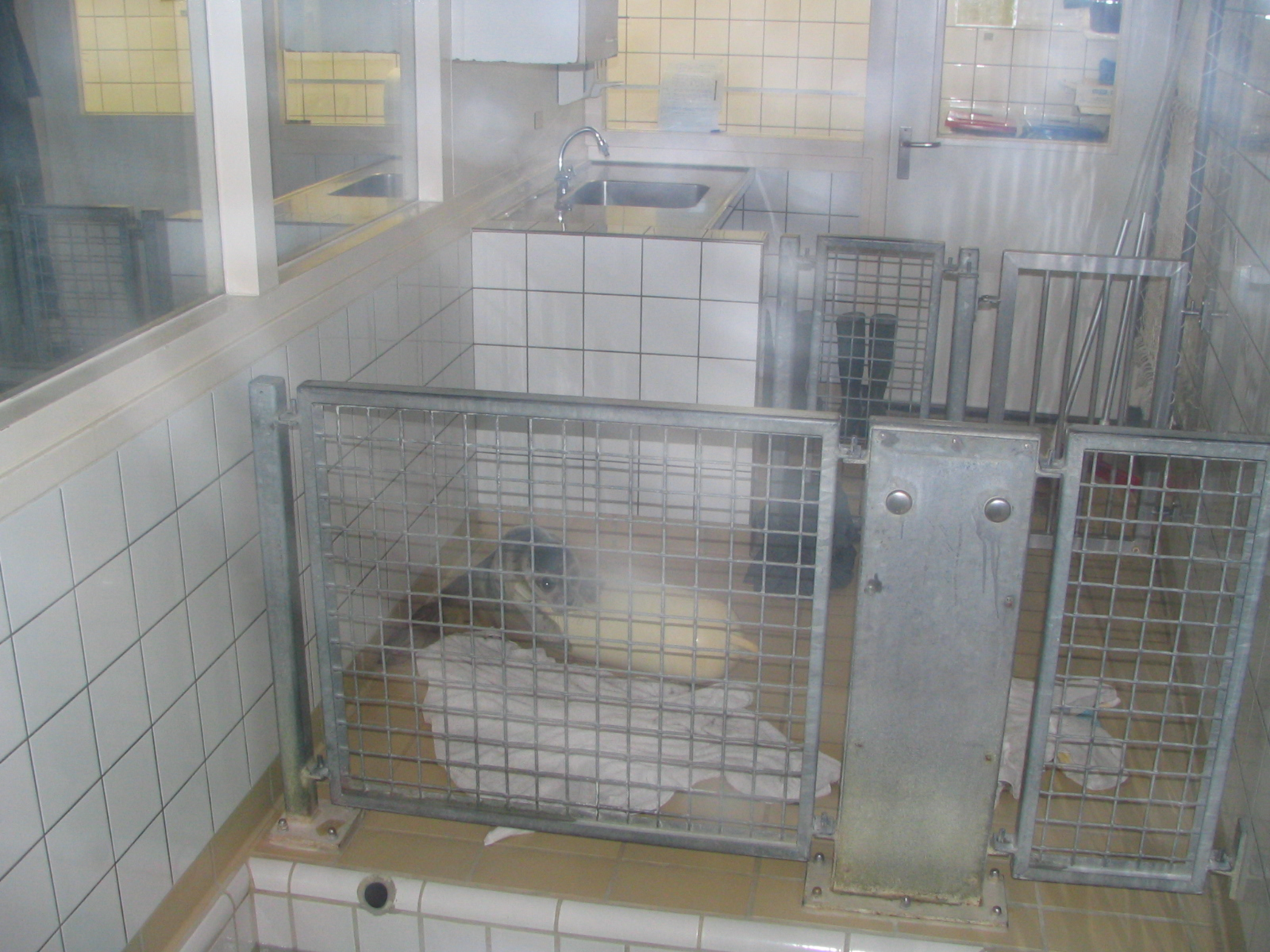
Seal pup in a quarantine unit in 2005

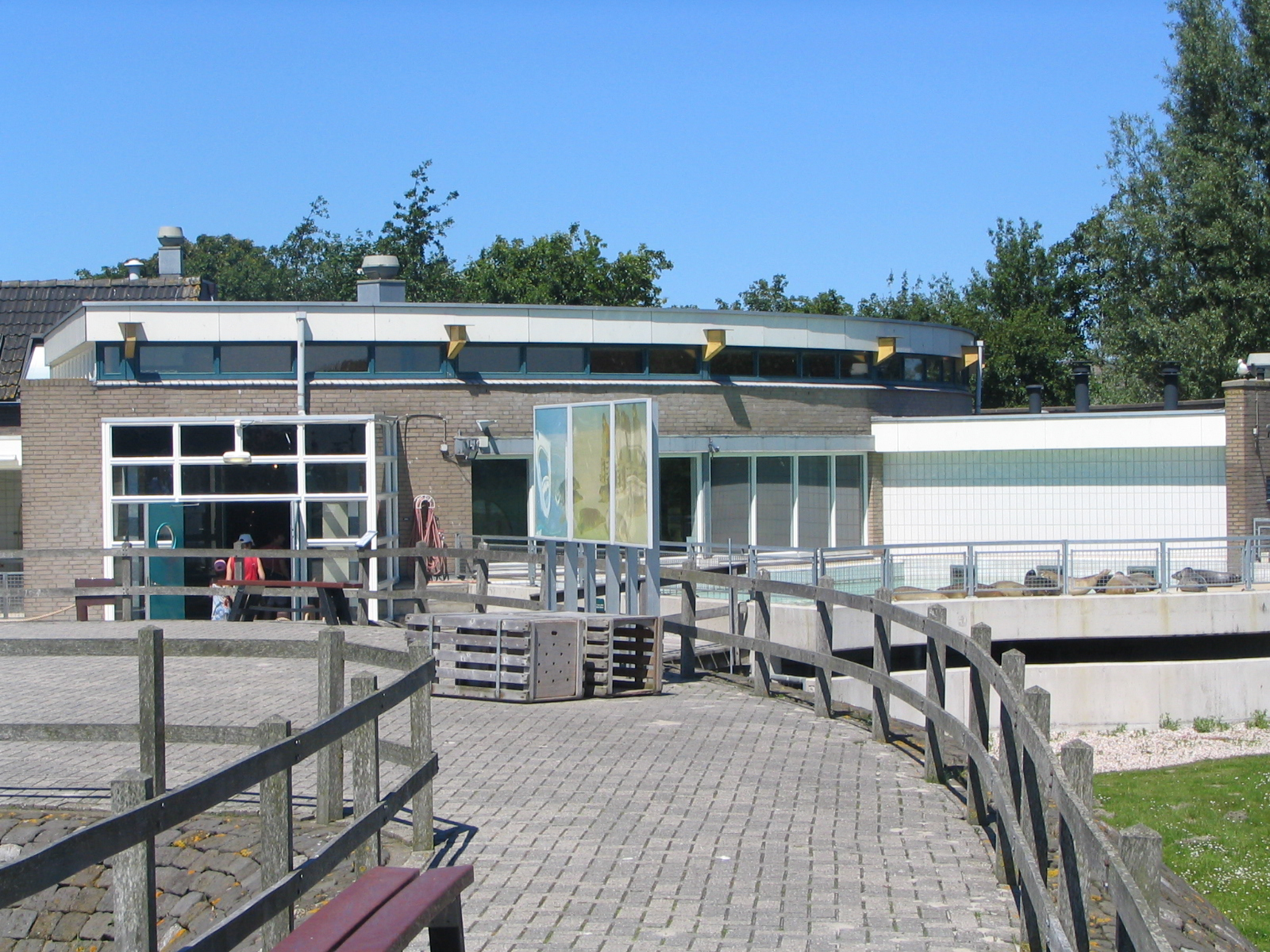
Main building in Pieterburen

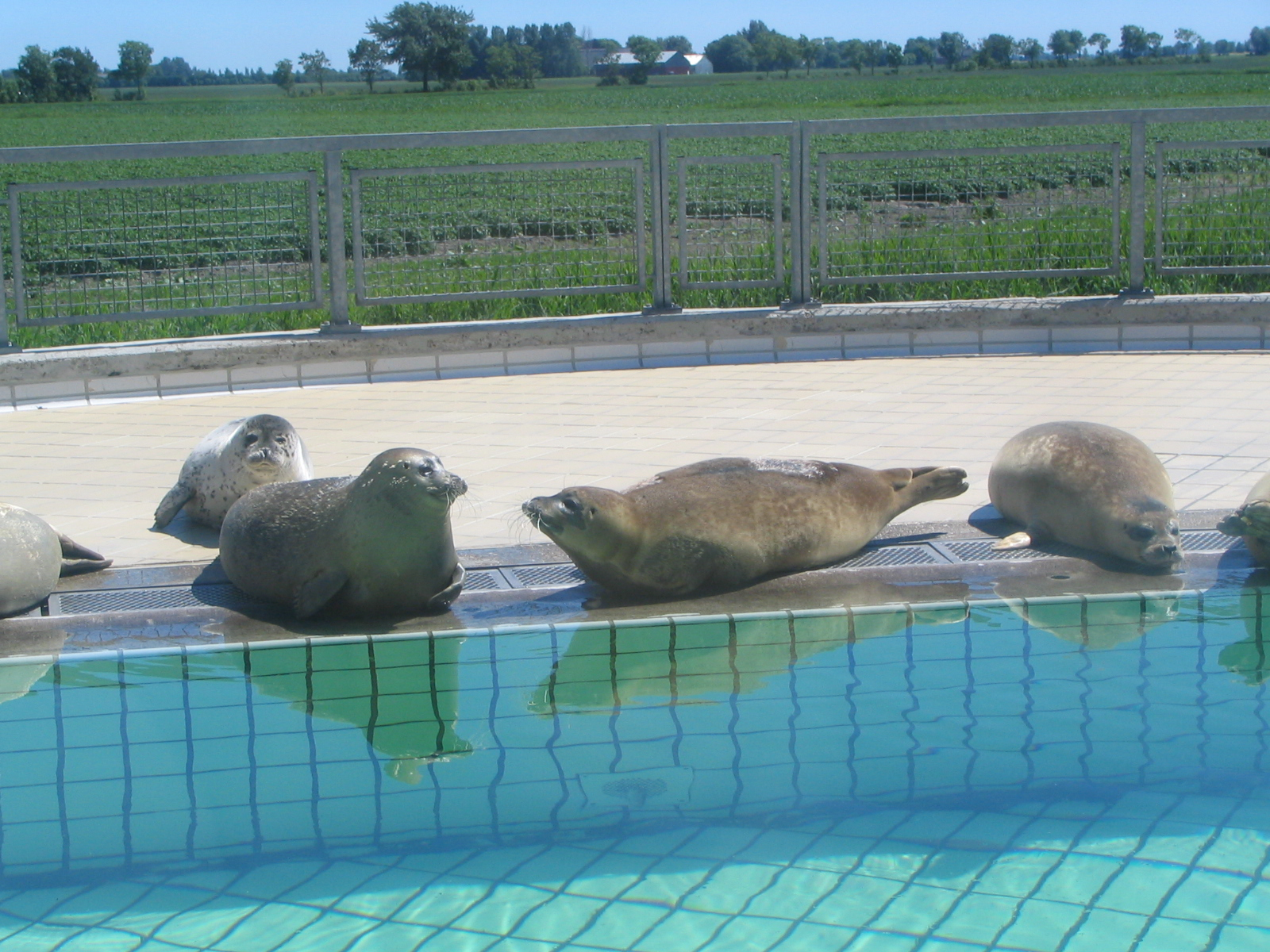

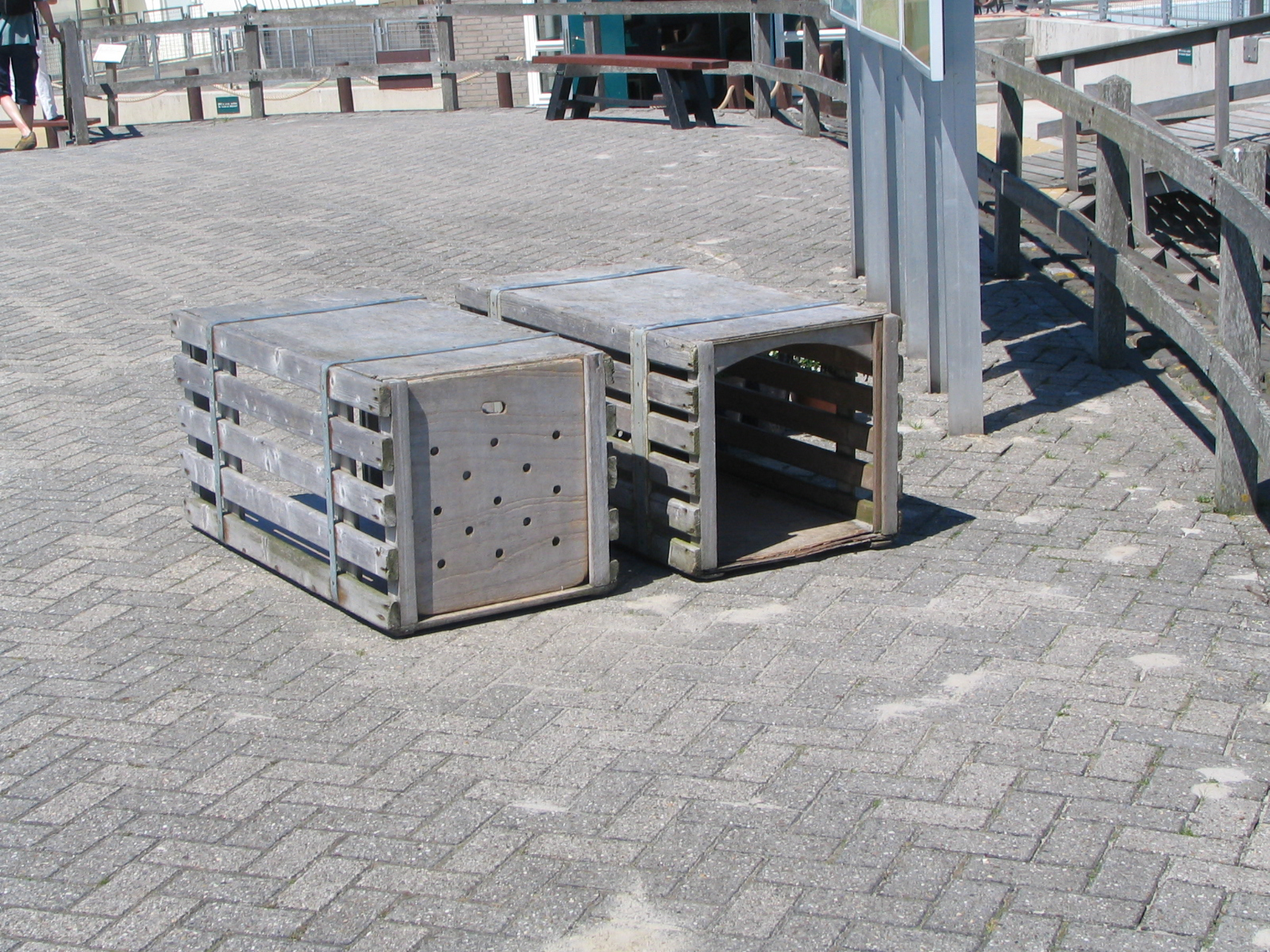
Seal transportation crates

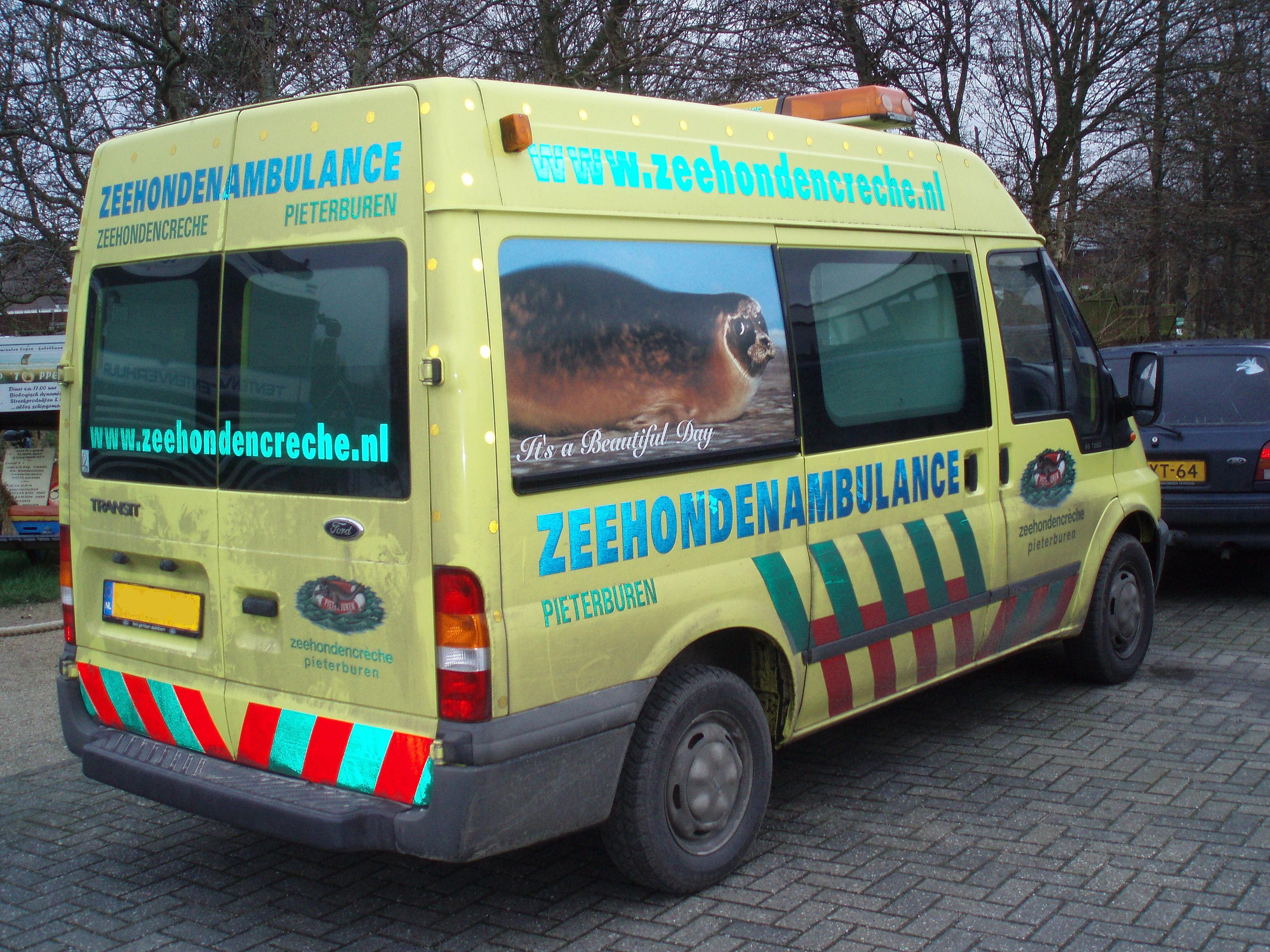
Seal ambulance used by the SRRC in 2007

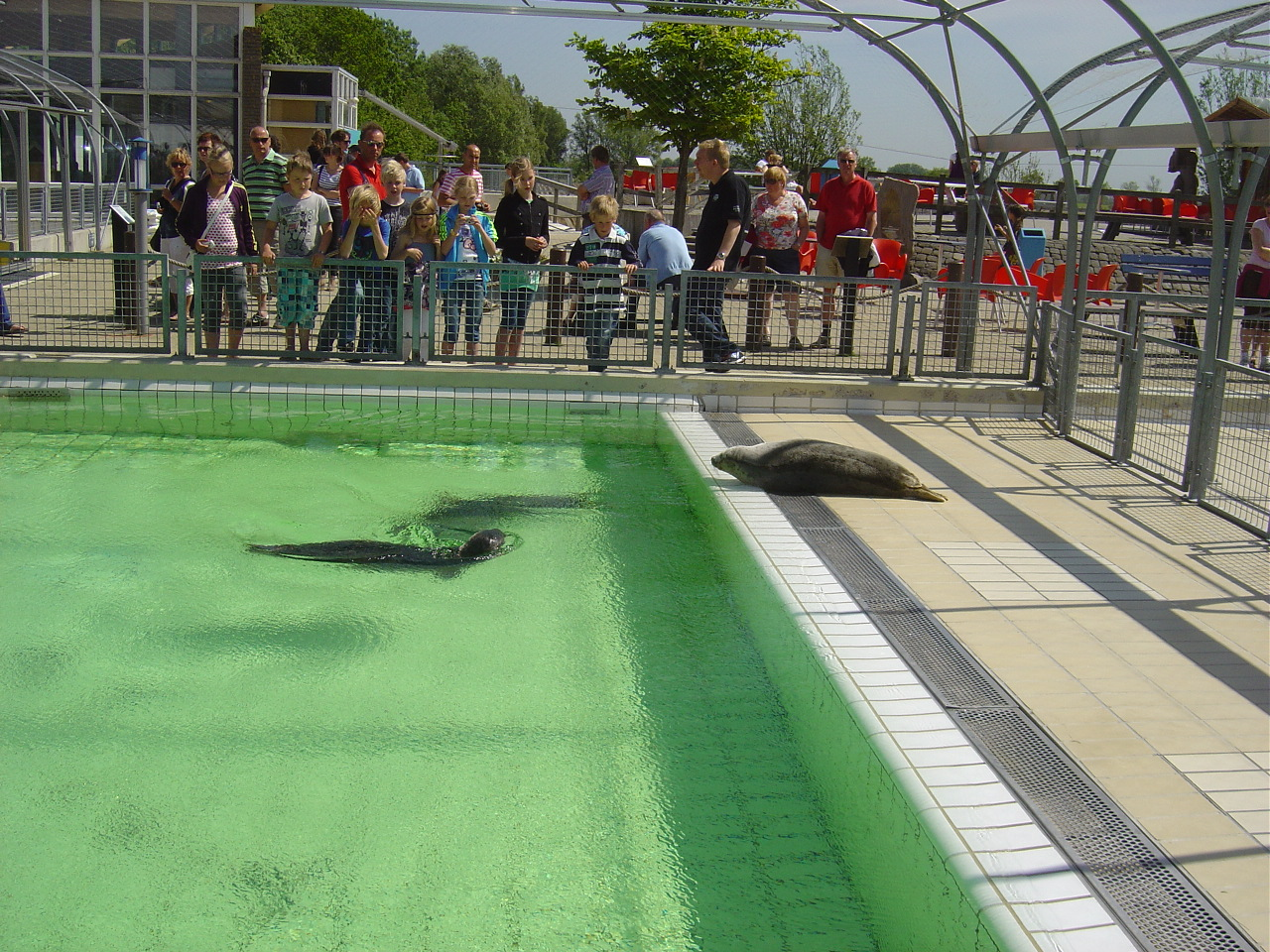

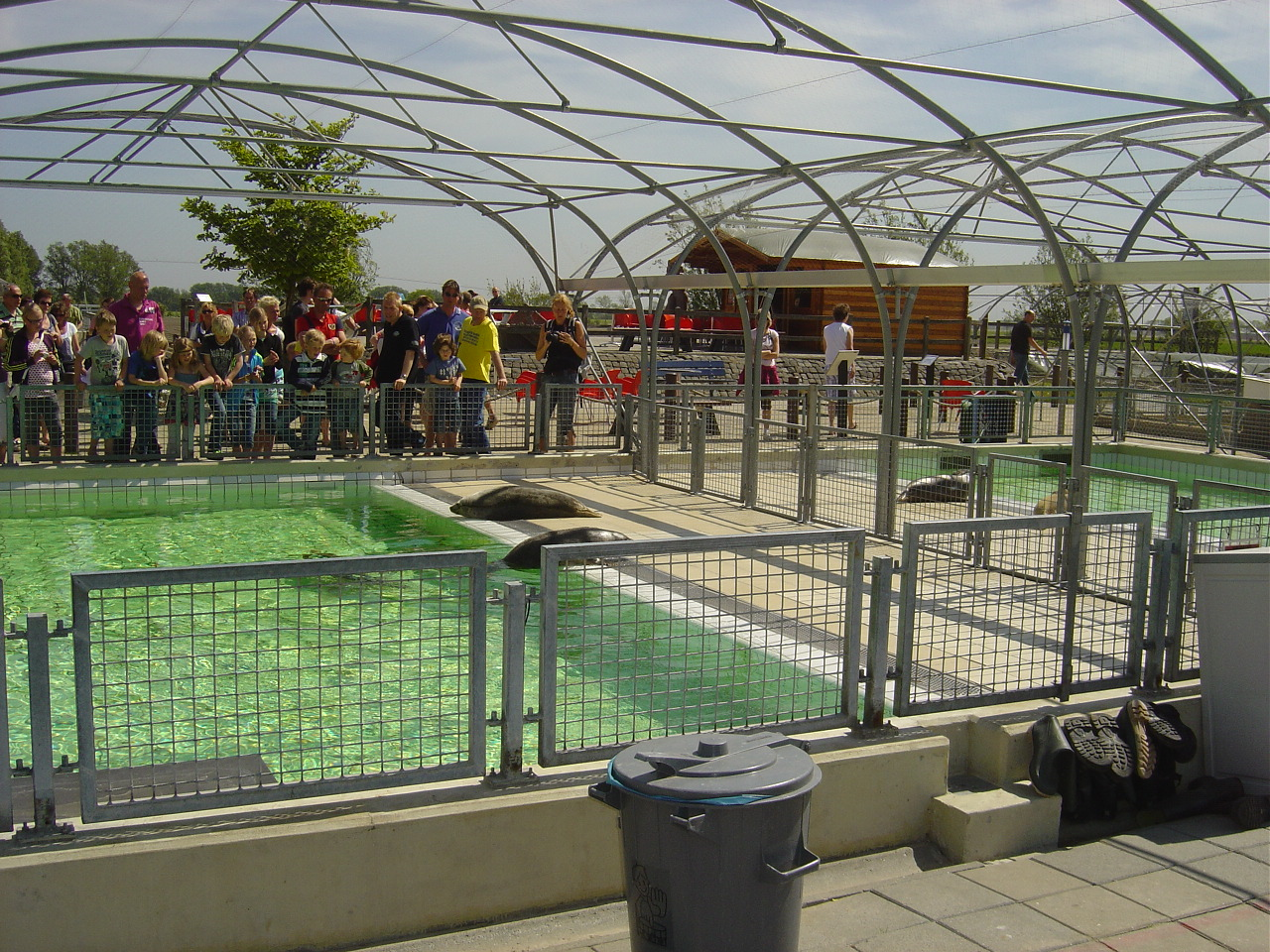

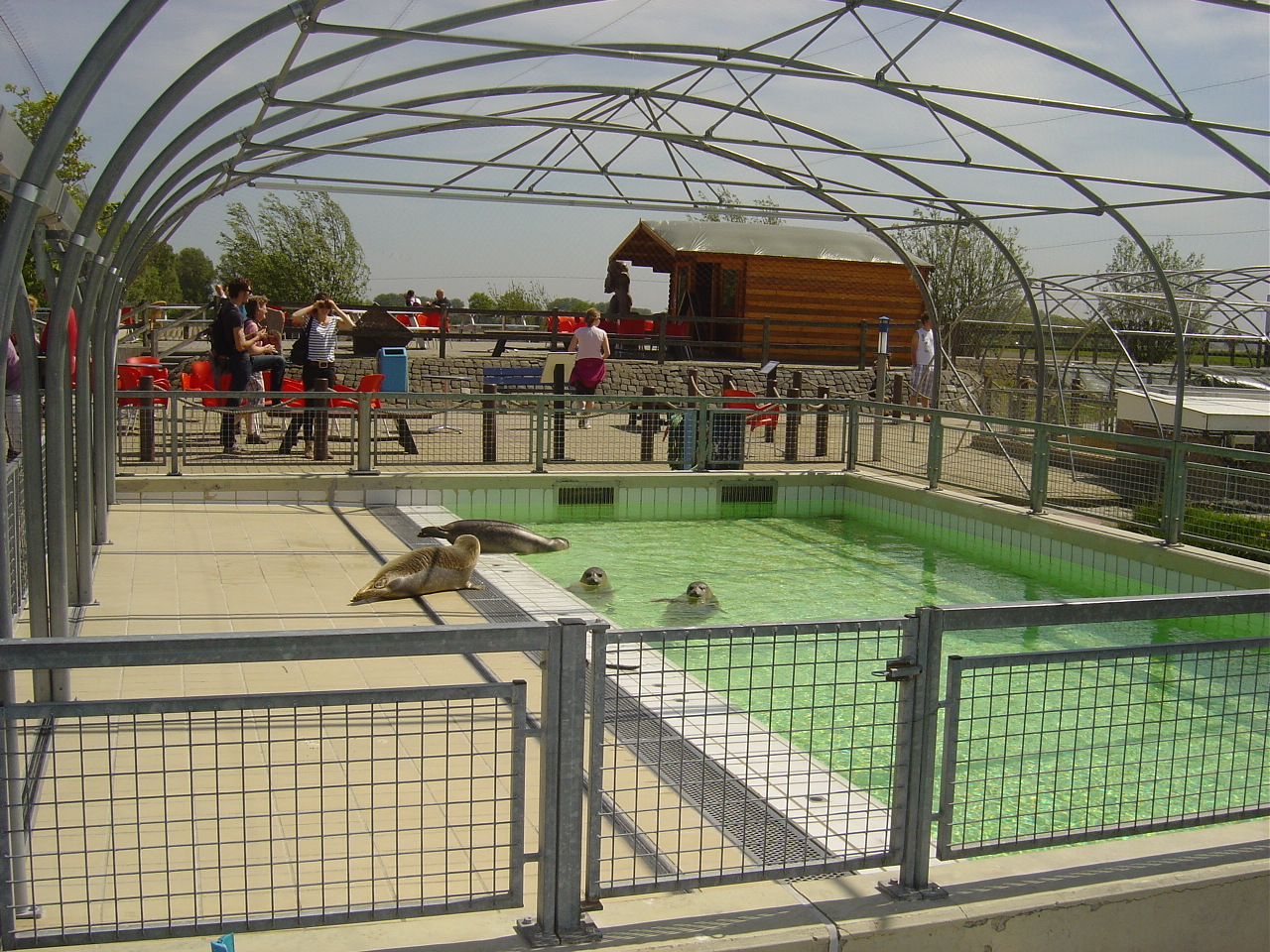

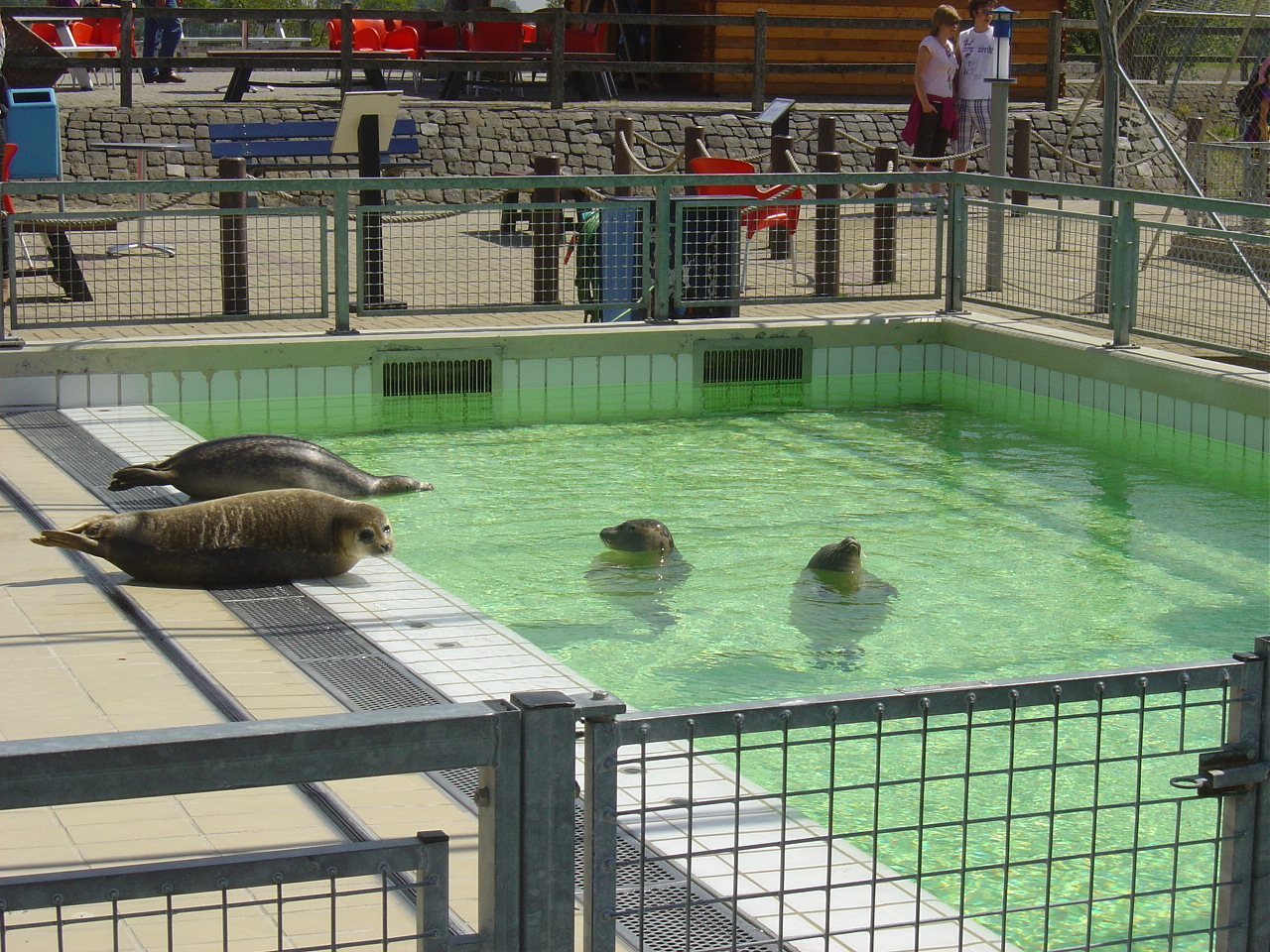

=== Videos ===
1972 newsreel about the early seal rehabilitation effort in Pieterburen, with commentary by Lenie 't Hart (in Dutch)

1979 newsreel showing the seals in Pieterburen being moved into a new enclosure (in Dutch)

== See also ==
- Ecomare
- Lauwersmeer National Park
- Wadden Sea
