= Michałkowo, Kuyavian-Pomeranian Voivodeship =

Michałkowo
- Village
- Location within Poland
- Coordinates: 52°40′N 19°24′E
- Country: Poland
- Voivodeship: Kuyavian-Pomeranian
- County: Lipno
- Gmina: Dobrzyń nad Wisłą

Michałkowo [mixau̯ˈkɔvɔ] is a village in the administrative district of Gmina Dobrzyń nad Wisłą, within Lipno County, Kuyavian-Pomeranian Voivodeship, in north-central Poland.
