= Kamienica, Gmina Dobrzyń nad Wisłą =

Kamienica
- Village
- Location within Poland
- Coordinates: 52°39′00″N 19°23′31″E
- Country: Poland
- Voivodeship: Kuyavian-Pomeranian
- County: Lipno
- Gmina: Dobrzyń nad Wisłą

Kamienica [kamjɛˈnit͡sa] is a village in the administrative district of Gmina Dobrzyń nad Wisłą, within Lipno County, Kuyavian-Pomeranian Voivodeship, in north-central Poland.
