= Krojczyn =

- Village
- Location within Poland
- Coordinates: 52°41′N 19°12′E
- Country: Poland
- Voivodeship: Kuyavian-Pomeranian
- County: Lipno
- Gmina: Dobrzyń nad Wisłą
- Population: 453

Krojczyn (Polish: [ˈkrɔjt͡ʂɨn]) is a village in the administrative district of Gmina Dobrzyń nad Wisłą, within Lipno County, Kuyavian-Pomeranian Voivodeship, in north-central Poland.

In 2002 the village had a population of 453.
