= Tulibowo =

- Village
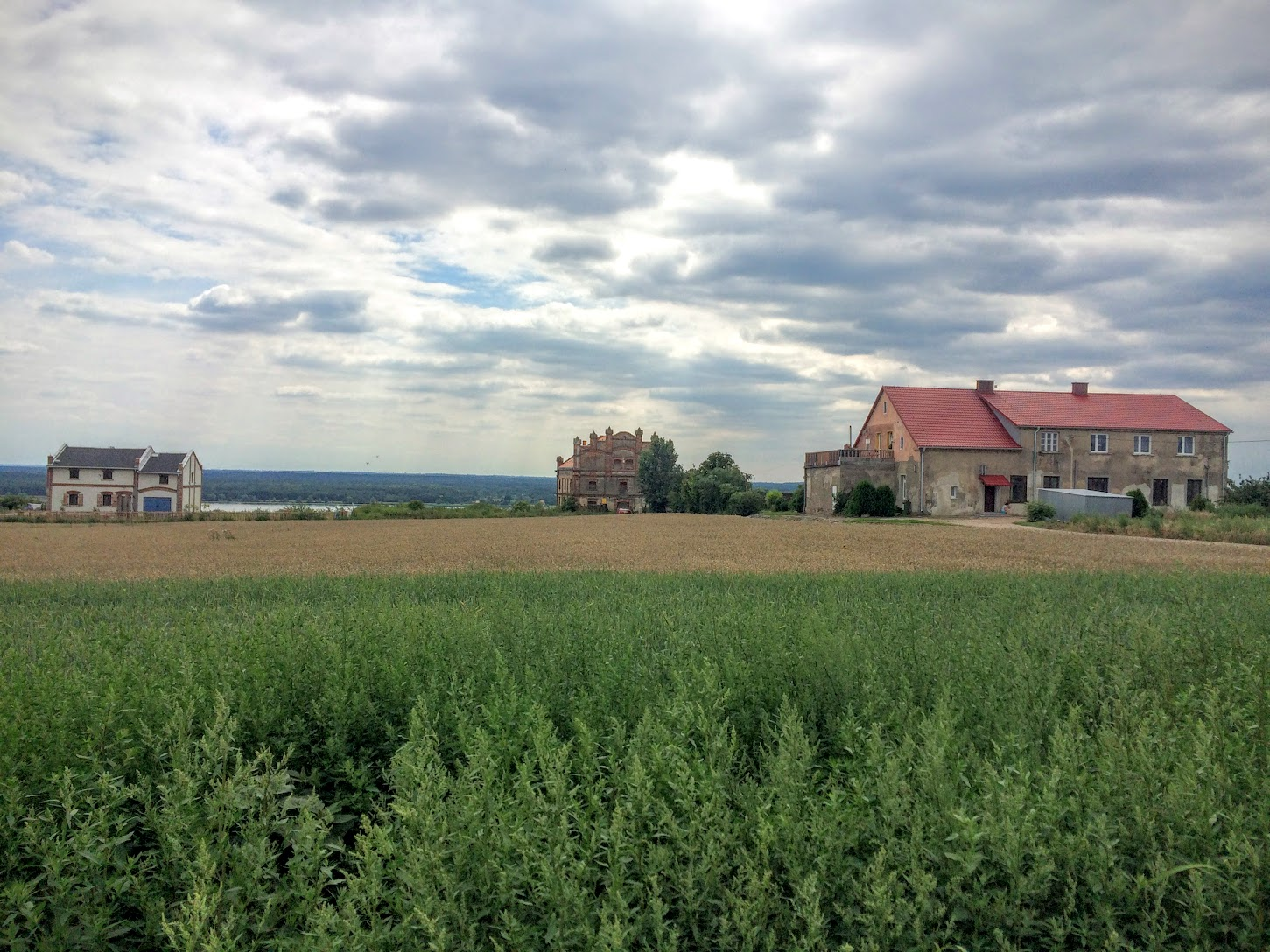

- Location within Poland
- Coordinates: 52°40′N 19°13′E
- Country: Poland
- Voivodeship: Kuyavian-Pomeranian
- County: Lipno
- Gmina: Dobrzyń nad Wisłą
- Time zone: UTC+1 (CET)
  - Summer (DST): UTC+2 (CEST)
- Vehicle registration: CLI

Tulibowo [tuliˈbɔvɔ] is a village in the administrative district of Gmina Dobrzyń nad Wisłą, within Lipno County, Kuyavian-Pomeranian Voivodeship, in north-central Poland.

Tulibowo was a private village, administratively located in the Dobrzyń County in the Inowrocław Voivodeship in the Greater Poland Province of the Kingdom of Poland.
