= Pieterburen =

- Village
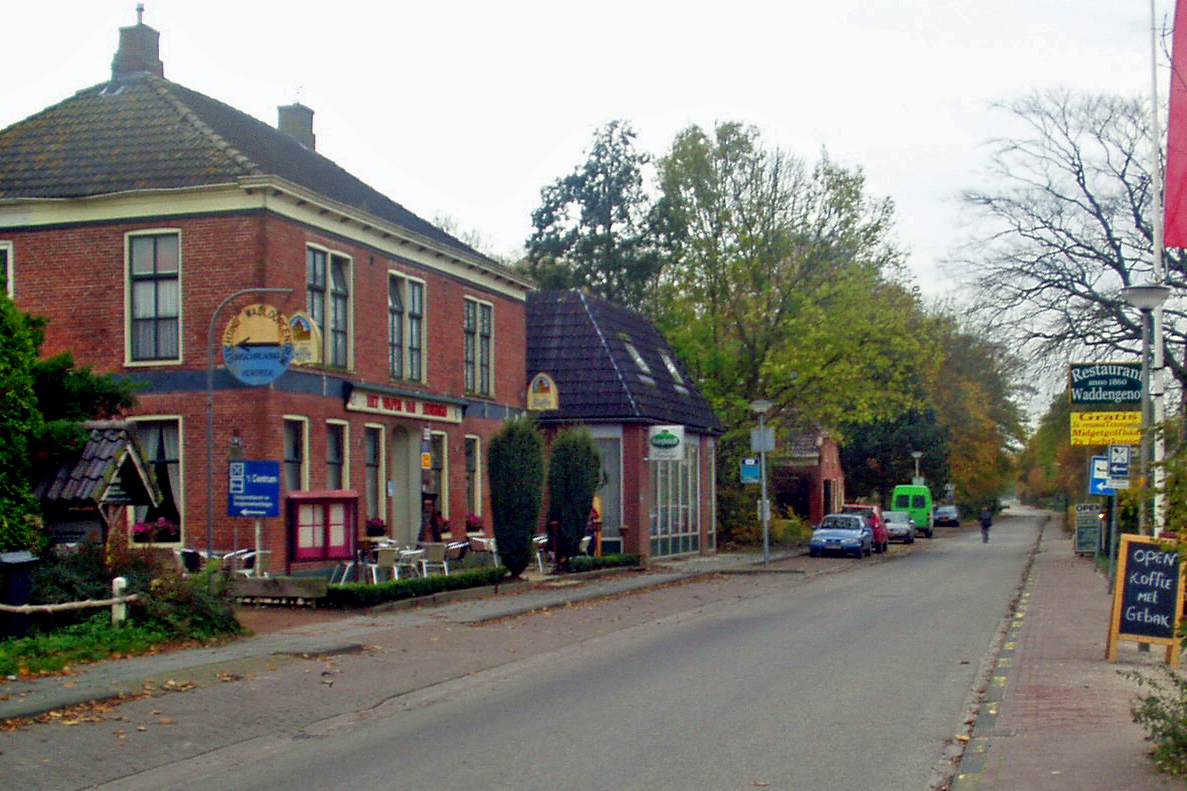
- Hoofdstraat, Pieterburen, at the left the café Het wapen van Hunsingo (nowadays Bij de buren van Pieter)

- Location of Pieterburen in the province of Groningen Pieterburen (Netherlands)
- Coordinates: 53°24′00″N 6°27′10″E
- Country: Netherlands
- Province: Groningen
- Municipality: Het Hogeland

Area
  - Total: 0.69 km^{2} (0.27 sq mi)
- Elevation: 1 m (3.3 ft)

Population (2021)
  - Total: 290
  - Density: 420/km^{2} (1,100/sq mi)
- Time zone: UTC+1 (CET)
  - Summer (DST): UTC+2 (CEST)
- Postal code: 9968
- Dialing code: 0595

Pieterburen is a village in the northeastern Netherlands, located in the municipality of Het Hogeland, Groningen.

== History ==
Around 1300, a dike was built north of the present village. During the 14th century, a settlement appeared on a mudflat of the river Hunze. The village was first mentioned in 1371 as Sancti Petri when the church was constructed. Pieterburen means the neighbourhood near Saint Peter.

== Overview ==
Pieterburen is situated on the ‘Hogeland’ (high land) of northeastern Groningen. It is an area with brick Gothic churches, stately farms, and endless views over the land, all the way to the Wadden Sea.

Pieterburen is known for its Seal Rehabilitation and Research Centre, the vicarage garden Domies toen, the old mill De Vier Winden (The Four Winds). The castle, Dijksterhuis, was built in the 15th century, but torn down in 1903.

Pieterburen is one of the starting points for wadlopen (mudflat hiking). At low tide, it is possible to walk to the island of Schiermonnikoog. Mudflat hiking is potentially dangerous, and is only allowed under the supervision of a licensed guide.

Pieterburen is the start of the Pieterpad, a long-distance hiking trail to Sint Pieter in the extreme south of the Netherlands.

== Notable people ==
- Cornelis Simon Meijer (1904–1974), mathematician

== Gallery ==
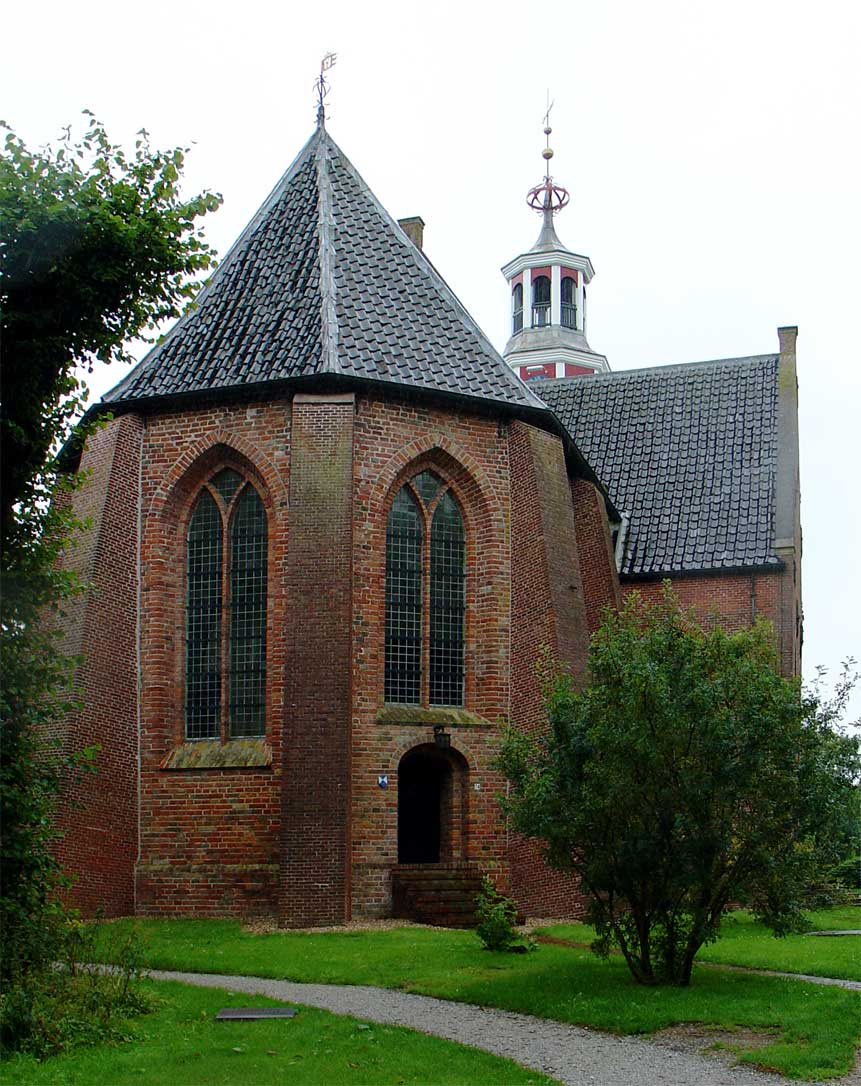
The church

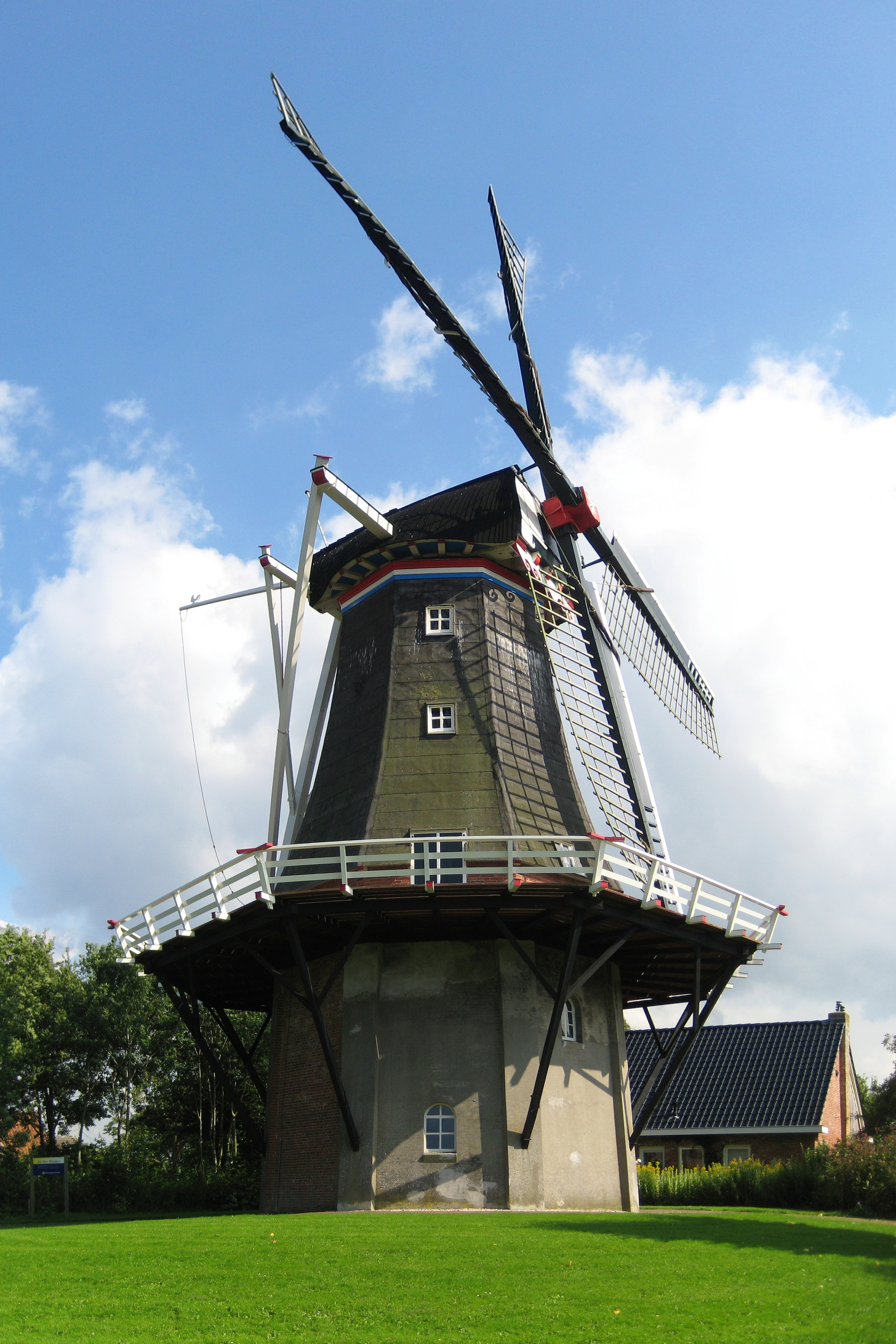
Wind mill De Vier Winden

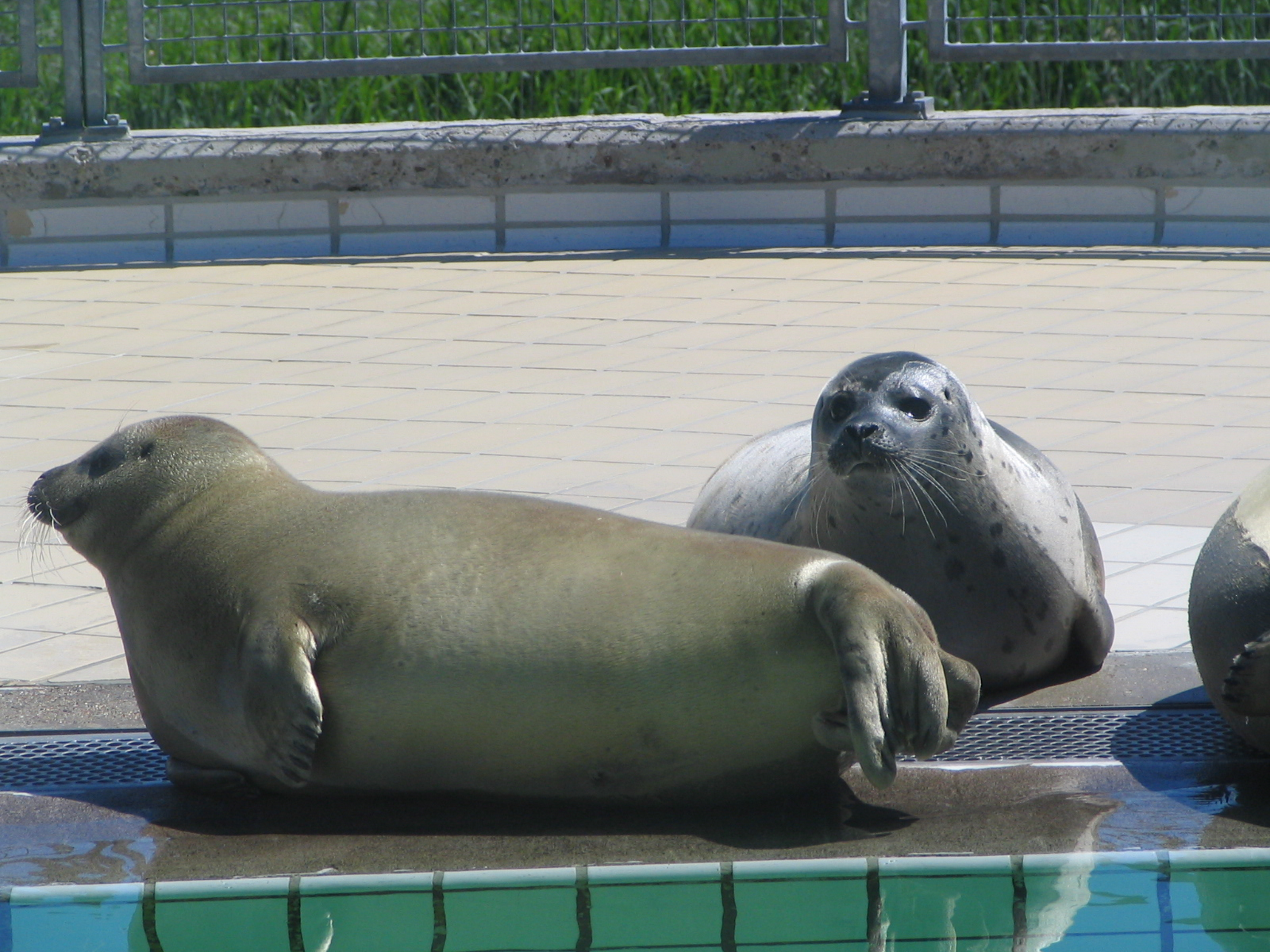
Seals in the rehabilitation center

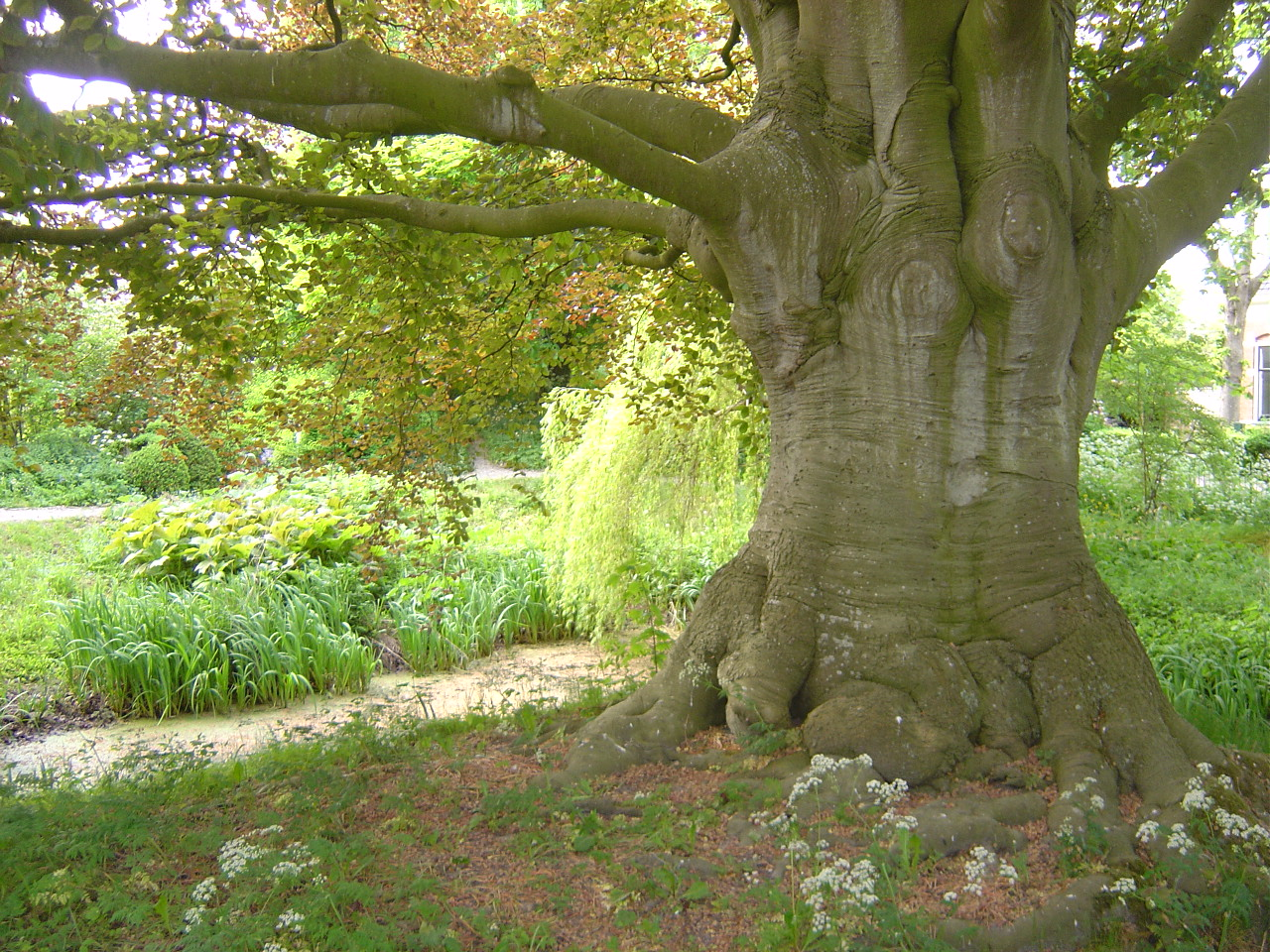
Beech in Domies toen
