= Lenie Passage =

Lenie Passage (64°44′S 64°23′W) is a northwest–southeast passage 1 nautical mile (2 km) wide between the Gossler Islands and the Joubin Islands in the Palmer Archipelago, Antarctica. It was named by the Advisory Committee on Antarctic Names for Pieter J. Lenie, Master of the RV Hero in 1972–73 and 1973–74. Lenie is believed to be first to navigate and carry out sounding of this passage, in the Hero in January and February 1973.
