= Laquet de Greziolles =

Lake in Hautes-Pyrénées, France

Laquet de Gréziolles
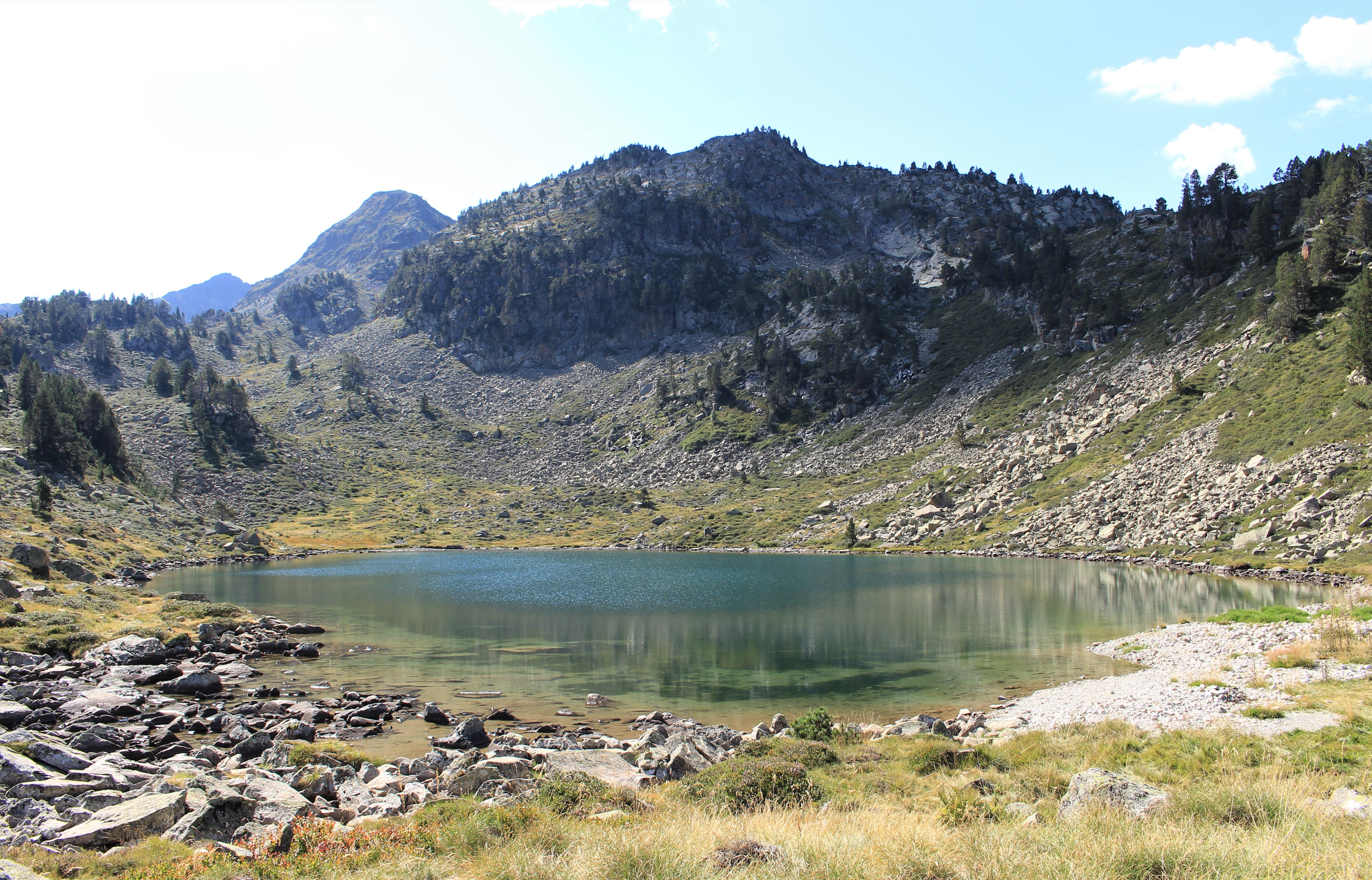

- Location within Pyrenees
- Location: Hautes-Pyrénées, Pyrénées
- Coordinates: 42°53′02″N 00°12′25″E
- Basin countries: France
- Surface area: 1.7 ha (4.2 acres)
- Max. depth: 7.9 m (26 ft)
- Surface elevation: 2,119 m (6,952 ft)

Laquet de Gréziolles is a lake in Hautes-Pyrénées, Pyrénées, France. At an elevation of 2,119 m, its surface area is 0.017 km^{2}.

In the neighbourhood of the larger lac de Gréziollles, it is accessible by the GR 10 C footpath.
