= Lac de Gréziolles =

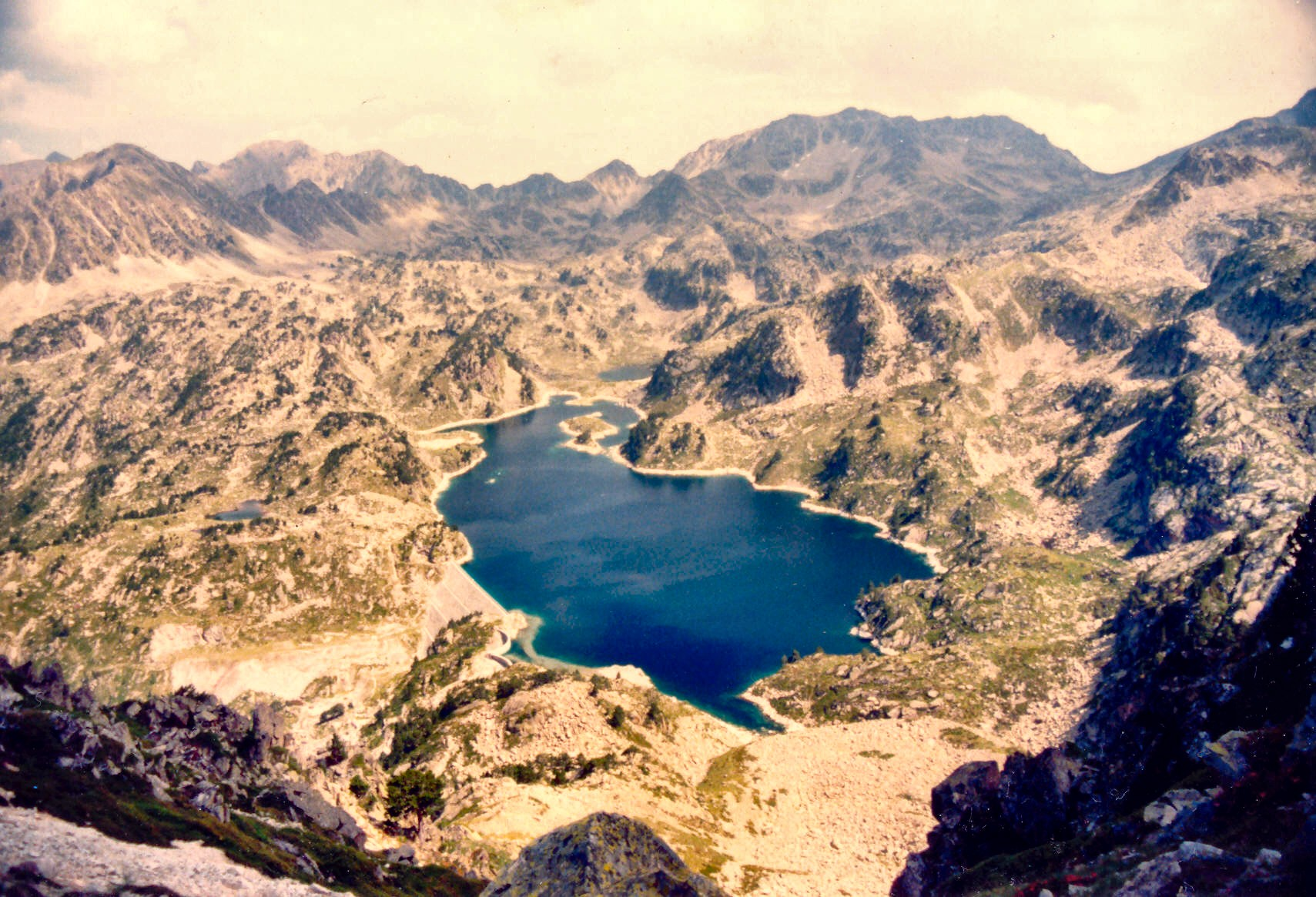

- Location within Pyrenees
- Location: Hautes-Pyrénées, Pyrénées
- Coordinates: 42°53′25″N 00°12′00″E
- Primary outflows: Adour de Garet
- Basin countries: France
- Max. length: 879 metres (2,884 ft)
- Max. width: 307 metres (1,007 ft)
- Surface area: 20 ha (49 acres)
- Max. depth: 36 m (118 ft)
- Surface elevation: 2,113 m (6,932 ft)

Lac de Gréziolles is a lake in Hautes-Pyrénées, Pyrénées, France. At an elevation of 2113 m, its surface area is 0.2 km^{2}.

It is accessible by the GR 10 C footpath.

== See also ==
- Laquet de Gréziolles
