= Latka (disambiguation) =

A latka or latke is a type of potato pancake.

Latka may also refer to:

- Dariusz Łatka (born 1978), Polish footballer
- Martin Latka (born 1984), Czech footballer
- Ramesh Latke (1970-2022), 21st century Indian politician
- Latka Gravas, a character on the TV show Taxi
- the title character of Latke, the Lucky Dog, a children's picture book
- PZL SM-4 Łątka, a Polish prototype helicopter
