= Hoplit =

Hoplit may refer to:

- Hoplite was a citizen and soldier in Ancient Greece
- Mil Mi-2 was codenamed Hoplit by NATO
