= List of countries by aircraft and spacecraft exports =

The following is a list of countries by exports of aircraft, including helicopters, and spacecraft (Harmonized System code 8802). Exports realized under secret code are not counted. The use of secret code is particularly frequent for military equipment, including military aircraft. For example, Russia exported 14 fighter aircraft Su-30 in the year 2016, as well as other types of military aircraft. Depending on sources, the Su-30 are sold at more or less US$50 million per unit. Similarly, Pakistan has made deal of 40 JF-17 Block 3 to Azerbijan worth $4.6 billion in 2025.

== Manufacturers ==
Country	Country's main aircraft and spacecraft manufacturers
Brazil	Embraer
Canada	Bombardier, Viking Air
China	Comac
France	Airbus, Dassault Aviation, Safran, ATR, Arianespace
Germany	Airbus
India	Hindustan Aeronautics Limited
Pakistan	Pakistan Aeronautical Complex
Poland	PZL Mielec, PZL-Świdnik
Spain	Airbus
Switzerland	Pilatus Aircraft
United Kingdom	Airbus
United States	Boeing, Lockheed Martin, Sikorsky Aircraft, Gulfstream Aerospace

== International Trade Centre ==
Data is for 2024, in thousands of United States dollars and tons/units.

List of countries by aircraft and spacecraft exports (2024)
Country	Value exported (thousands USD)	Trade balance (thousands USD)	Quantity exported	
Country	Value exported (thousands USD)	Trade balance (thousands USD)	Value	Units
World	107,304,117	−20,335,457	–	–
France	30,786,190	29,310,530	25,368	Tons
Germany	25,934,669	22,155,494	15,352	Tons
Canada	8,753,518	5,759,852	1,110	Units
Ireland	6,614,867	−12,670,160	5,024	Tons
India	6,049,159	−5,672,238	53,220	Units
Brazil	3,766,938	1,281,297	3,219	Tons
Spain	3,631,131	2,167,705	5,315	Tons
United States	3,016,118	−15,095,129	11,854	Units
China	2,989,995	−6,226,694	3,927	Tons
United Arab Emirates	2,301,287	−896,172	–	–
United Kingdom	1,699,491	−5,739,359	1,473	Tons
Switzerland	1,598,476	396,525	984	Tons
Israel	1,280,814	1,098,314	–	–
Kazakhstan	931,180	−859,169	937	Tons
Poland	769,288	−1,059,530	1,552	Tons
Thailand	591,774	−1,639,019	2,008	Units
South Korea	563,549	−2,420,342	721	Tons
Sweden	487,622	−8,565	98	Units
Australia	485,682	−1,411,823	3,384	Units
Netherlands	377,929	−1,107,828	4,659	Tons
Turkey	377,324	−3,289,208	141	Tons
Italy	374,688	−288,687	238	Tons
Russia	306,572	290,251	–	–
Chile	288,886	231,305	659	Units
Austria	272,446	−230,439	351	Tons
Czech Republic	249,562	−241,945	–	–
Norway	204,433	−483,096	309	Tons
Oman	204,212	−35,834	–	–
Belgium	165,855	−117,221	268	Tons
South Africa	151,265	−331,211	1,437	Units
Malta	136,972	−268,242	54	Tons
Uzbekistan	127,364	−898,970	95	Tons
Denmark	121,570	−287,353	157	Tons
New Zealand	114,564	−842,502	170	Tons
Cayman Islands	111,078	−95,651	–	–
Bhutan	98,765	17,527	–	–
Singapore	95,509	−2,573,804	1,912	Units
Malaysia	92,618	−1,060,559	31,435	Units
Montserrat	76,156	76,156	–	–
Bangladesh	69,566	−9,518	–	–
Bolivia	68,420	54,697	255	Tons
Hong Kong	67,616	−1,009,215	134,465	Units
Angola	67,168	35,176	97	Tons
Rwanda	47,634	47,048	23	Tons
Myanmar	45,700	23,900	34	Tons
Portugal	44,488	−795,564	114	Tons
Mongolia	39,951	7,149	29	Tons
Cyprus	38,636	−172,718	138	Tons
Finland	38,541	−280,153	11	Tons
Guyana	38,106	−69,933	15	Tons
Croatia	37,051	−396,508	109	Tons
Slovenia	36,412	−120,544	80	Tons
Iceland	30,813	−51,314	173	Tons
Indonesia	26,319	−273,529	56	Tons
Bulgaria	24,623	−157,309	71	Tons
Slovakia	22,825	−203,267	114	Tons
Montenegro	21,667	20,615	93	Tons
Saudi Arabia	20,452	−24,678	373	Tons
Benin	20,030	3,714	13	Tons
Kyrgyzstan	19,799	−2,185	227	Tons
Armenia	18,986	−16,528	27	Tons
Colombia	18,614	−828,133	51	Tons
Japan	17,826	−3,493,902	–	–
Jordan	17,745	−93,781	84	Tons
Ukraine	17,652	−109,226	210	Tons
Saint Kitts and Nevis	15,404	15,398	53	Tons
Luxembourg	12,863	−366,123	16	Tons
Georgia	12,200	−145,637	36	Tons
Botswana	11,846	−19,404	23	Tons
Romania	11,660	−400,497	68	Tons
Côte d'Ivoire	9,910	6,475	7	Tons
Latvia	9,304	−2,279	130	Tons
Lithuania	9,273	773	23	Tons
Papua New Guinea	8,017	−9,519	5	Units
Estonia	7,269	−7,594	156	Tons
Tanzania	7,069	−14,703	41	Tons
Hungary	6,168	−578	2,891	Tons
Cambodia	5,991	5,308	3	Tons
Vietnam	5,870	−988,037	–	–
Guatemala	5,837	−38,284	6	Tons
Philippines	5,601	−1,311,072	16	Tons
Costa Rica	5,068	558	10	Tons
Zimbabwe	4,313	−14,578	17	Tons
Uruguay	4,264	−2,330	10	Tons
Ecuador	3,056	−8,995	18	Tons
British Virgin Islands	2,442	−133,901	3	Tons
Fiji	2,442	2,272	3	Units
Madagascar	2,378	453	14	Tons
Greece	2,238	−116,262	7	Tons
DR Congo	2,146	−17,170	1	Units
Dominican Republic	2,047	1,704	8	Tons
Zambia	1,988	−10,136	13	Tons
Burkina Faso	1,469	216	9	Tons
Laos	1,432	−9,466	–	–
Brunei	987	822	409	Units
Panama	877	−459	2	Tons
Ghana	675	−38,269	–	–
Morocco	642	−87,134	1	Tons
Trinidad and Tobago	599	−27,783	12	Tons
Falkland Islands	413	−20,271	1	Tons
Namibia	405	−130,009	5	Tons
Serbia	360	−136,485	7	Tons
Senegal	337	129	6	Tons
Kenya	319	−252,872	6	Tons
Cameroon	287	283	–	–
Bahamas	286	161	10,465	Units
Taiwan	260	−1,928,366	1	Tons
Marshall Islands	256	−338	–	–
North Macedonia	196	167	3	Tons
Pakistan	190	−987	3	Units
Egypt	167	167	–	–
New Caledonia	145	−42	1	Units
Venezuela	127	−5,020	–	–
Mauritania	97	−15	–	–
El Salvador	94	−1,617	2	Tons
Barbados	88	75	3	Tons
Mauritius	86	−3,295	–	–
Niger	37	−19	–	–
Peru	36	−13,654	–	–
Uganda	29	−108	–	–
Bosnia and Herzegovina	21	−326	1	Tons
Eswatini	16	−1,209	–	–
Turkmenistan	14	−78,054	1	Units
Iran	12	−3,886	–	–
Sierra Leone	7	0	22	Units
Mozambique	4	−8,875	–	–
Somalia	3	−801	–	–
Malawi	2	−342	–	–
Ethiopia	1	−585,476	–	–
Tunisia	1	−194,277	–	–

== Observatory of Economic Complexity ==
Data is for 2023, in United States dollars.

List of countries by aircraft and spacecraft exports (2023)
Country	Trade value
United States	39,069,442,127
France	28,078,693,906
Germany	25,876,547,950
Canada	9,184,774,550
Ireland	4,694,019,094
China	3,329,994,191
Brazil	3,273,938,546
United Kingdom	2,999,665,492
Switzerland	1,870,756,441
Spain	1,846,237,804
United Arab Emirates	1,463,295,714
Israel	1,369,861,639
Saudi Arabia	1,351,143,477
Italy	1,249,637,269
Thailand	1,021,878,568
Netherlands	850,223,367
Singapore	849,217,968
Austria	678,273,592
India	566,024,591
Turkey	439,685,136
Slovakia	407,746,792
Kuwait	407,667,923
Russia	405,830,746
Oman	405,519,415
Cayman Islands	397,188,859
Vietnam	374,597,839
Sweden	350,913,609
Malaysia	342,288,024
Czech Republic	300,773,255
Poland	276,528,963
Hungary	238,711,716
South Africa	238,554,997
Australia	200,068,874
Bangladesh	171,643,585
Kazakhstan	171,327,029
Bulgaria	150,335,681
Philippines	150,064,060
Lithuania	148,258,331
Japan	129,862,157
Bhutan	103,493,483
Luxembourg	98,881,876
Sri Lanka	96,595,937
Norway	93,237,342
Indonesia	77,802,583
Uzbekistan	69,164,069
Nepal	65,374,649
Malta	60,856,133
Maldives	57,760,964
Bermuda	57,102,716
Latvia	55,310,996
Azerbaijan	44,906,398
Slovenia	43,824,473
New Zealand	42,657,581
British Virgin Islands	39,504,557
Greece	39,210,779
Denmark	36,520,660
Egypt	34,714,123
Finland	34,291,147
Iraq	33,723,402
Chile	29,893,310
Bolivia	28,960,000
Kyrgyzstan	28,539,876
Morocco	26,488,376
Romania	25,102,129
Cote d'Ivoire	24,154,705
Peru	23,032,385
Colombia	22,720,445
Myanmar	21,644,098
Cyprus	21,148,897
Portugal	20,973,944
Belgium	20,822,542
Armenia	20,735,713
Gabon	19,804,366
Mali	17,947,770
Namibia	17,532,689
Pakistan	16,446,592
Taiwan	15,684,504
Croatia	14,658,729
San Marino	12,629,282
Madagascar	10,321,644
South Korea	10,145,467
Ukraine	9,602,363
Botswana	9,389,734
North Macedonia	9,184,248
Iceland	8,942,727
Ecuador	8,175,251
Tunisia	7,190,149
Cambodia	7,150,000
Estonia	7,149,924
Burkina Faso	6,330,929
Hong Kong	6,017,562
Guatemala	5,690,598
Mexico	5,032,556
Paraguay	4,078,906
Qatar	3,986,733
Malawi	3,769,579
Nigeria	3,715,866
Moldova	3,669,945
Niger	3,589,905
Kenya	3,516,169
Mauritius	3,471,036
Papua New Guinea	3,127,755
Macau	2,807,301
Samoa	2,510,230
Nicaragua	2,494,259
Uruguay	2,344,971
Montenegro	2,111,624
Zambia	1,977,433
Honduras	1,798,010
Argentina	1,334,260
Serbia	1,267,862
Zimbabwe	1,158,925
Costa Rica	1,115,563
Dominican Republic	1,102,765
Comoros	980,351
Cape Verde	964,271
Algeria	912,302
Albania	865,015
Senegal	779,786
Laos	606,319
Tanzania	416,963
Fiji	309,840
Bosnia and Herzegovina	242,357
Liberia	209,162
Brunei	200,468
Eswatini	156,110
Marshall Islands	155,296
Bahamas	109,546
Jamaica	83,254
Venezuela	82,800
Mozambique	52,000
Afghanistan	50,170
Panama	41,075
Vanuatu	39,654
Greenland	36,286
Antigua and Barbuda	34,076
Curacao	12,942
Montserrat	12,913
Gambia	10,877
Belize	6,860
New Caledonia	5,387
Mongolia	3,611
Angola	2,426
Uganda	1,432
Jordan	446
