= Leonardo Proteus =

Unmanned rotorcraft

Proteus

General information
- Type: Rotary-wing unmanned aerial vehicle
- National origin: United Kingdom
- Manufacturer: Leonardo Helicopters
- Status: In development
- Primary user: Royal Navy

History
- First flight: 16 January 2026

The Leonardo Proteus is an unmanned rotorcraft developed by Leonardo Helicopters for the Royal Navy. A technology demonstrator aircraft is currently being developed and manufactured at the company's site in Yeovil, England. The design features a modular payload bay which can be interchanged to meet different mission requirements, such as at-sea replenishment and anti-submarine warfare.

== Overview ==
In August 2013, the Ministry of Defence (MOD) placed a two-year contract with AugustaWestland (now Leonardo Helicopters) worth £2.3 million to develop its Rotary Wing Unmanned Aerial System (RWUAS) concept, which is funded through its Anti-Submarine Warfare Spearhead programme. An SW-4 Solo uncrewed rotorcraft, a derivative of the PZL SW-4 Puszczyk helicopter, was used for trials and experimentation. The MOD had previously considered the US Navy's MQ-8 Fire Scout but ruled it out as it "[did] not meet any endorsed UK capability need". A phase two contract, worth £8 million, jointly funded by Leonardo and the MOD, was signed in 2017 to continue development. A four-year contract worth £60 million was signed in July 2022 to develop a flyable three-tonne technology demonstrator, named Proteus, with the work to be carried out in Yeovil, England.

The final design of Proteus was revealed in January 2025. Its airframe is derived from the Kopter AW09 single-engine light helicopter and shares its shrouded anti-torque system and five-bladed rotor. It is designed to carry modular payloads which can be interchanged to meet different mission requirements, such as at-sea replenishment and anti-submarine warfare. It was developed through the use of a digital twin and artificial intelligence, with more than 40 components manufactured using advanced composite materials. Whilst it is being primarily developed for the Royal Navy, it will also be focused on exportability.

== Development ==
On 2 December 2025, Proteus conducted ground-based trials at Leonardo's facility located in Yeovil, UK. These trials encompassed evaluations of the engines, complex systems, and rotor blades in the company of high-ranking officials and specialists from the MOD. In January 2026, it successfully conducted its inaugural flight, departing from Predannack Airfield located in Cornwall. During this initial flight, Proteus was assigned a brief testing procedure that enabled the aircraft to autonomously manage its flying controls without any human intervention, all while being continuously overseen and monitored by test pilots stationed on the ground to guarantee flight safety.

== See also ==
- Future of the Royal Navy
