= PZL W-3 Sokół =

Utility helicopter family by PZL-Świdnik

W-3 Sokół
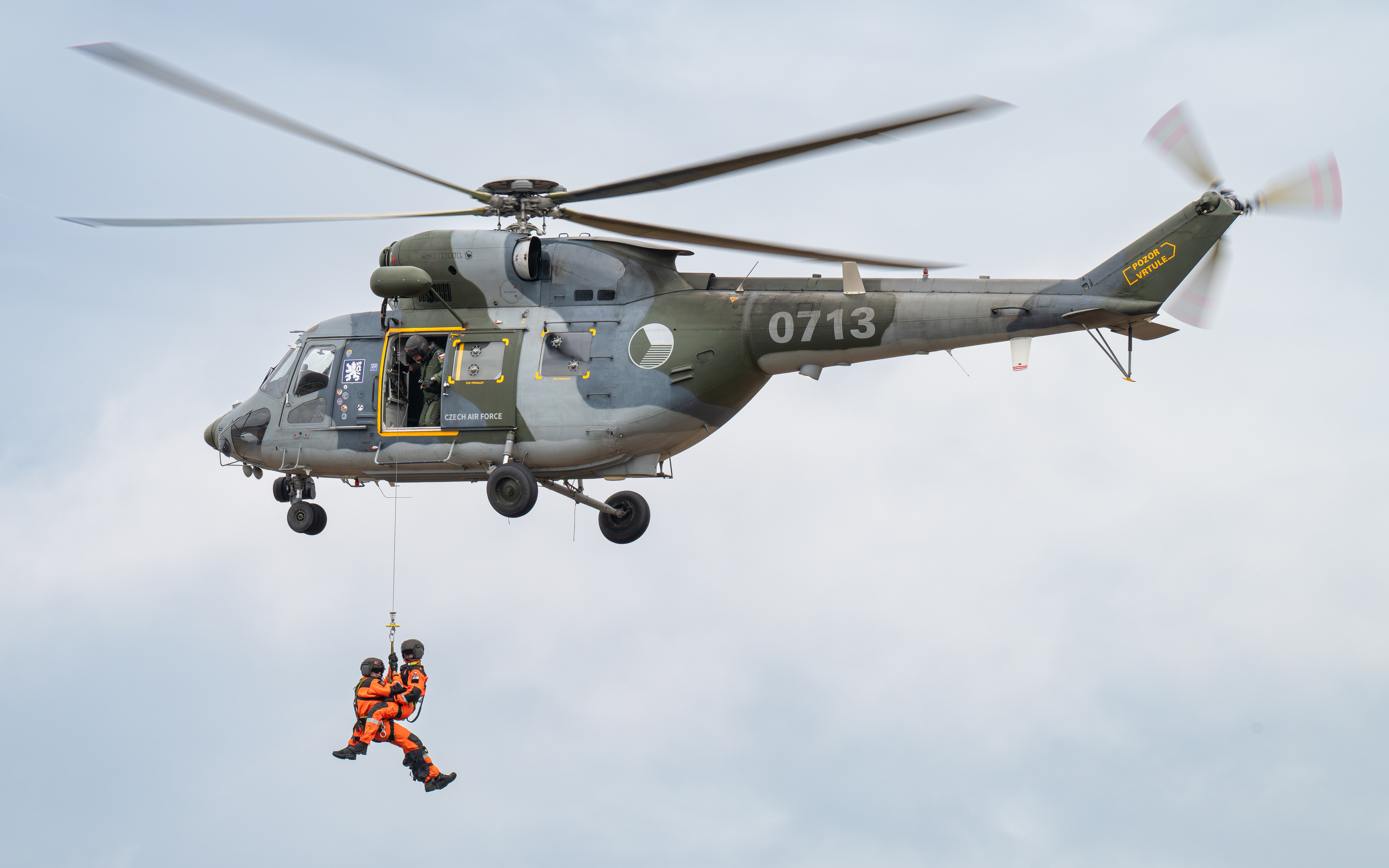
- A W-3 Sokół of the Czech Armed Forces

General information
- Type: Multipurpose utility helicopter
- National origin: Poland
- Manufacturer: PZL-Świdnik
- Status: In service
- Primary users: Polish Armed Forces Czech Air Force; Philippine Air Force; Myanmar Air Force
- Number built: 149 (as of 2011)

History
- Manufactured: 1985–2015
- Introduction date: 1987
- First flight: 16 November 1979

The PZL W-3 Sokół (English: "Falcon") is a medium-size twin-engine multipurpose helicopter developed and manufactured by Polish helicopter company PZL-Świdnik, which is now owned by Leonardo. It was the first helicopter entirely designed and produced in Poland.

== Design ==
The PZL W-3 is powered by a pair of Pratt & Whitney turboshaft engines built under license by a factory in Rzeszów. The original variant of the engine, the PZL-10W, and its successor, the PZL-10S, were both Polish-built modifications of the Russian Glushenkov TVD-10B turboprop design that had powered the earlier Antonov An-28. Composite materials are incorporated into the three-bladed tail rotor and four-bladed main rotor rotors assemblies. The rotors have an ice protection system, allowing the helicopter to operate in environments between -40 and +43°C.

The Sokół has been used in diverse occasions, including for VIPs, and is capable of performing a typical range of helicopter missions, including passenger transport, cargo, EMS/medevac, firefighting and search and rescue. When used in maritime environments, the rotorcraft is typically outfitted with floats, a transponder, a global positioning system navigation system, night-vision equipment, and a Lucas winch.

== Development ==
=== Origins ===
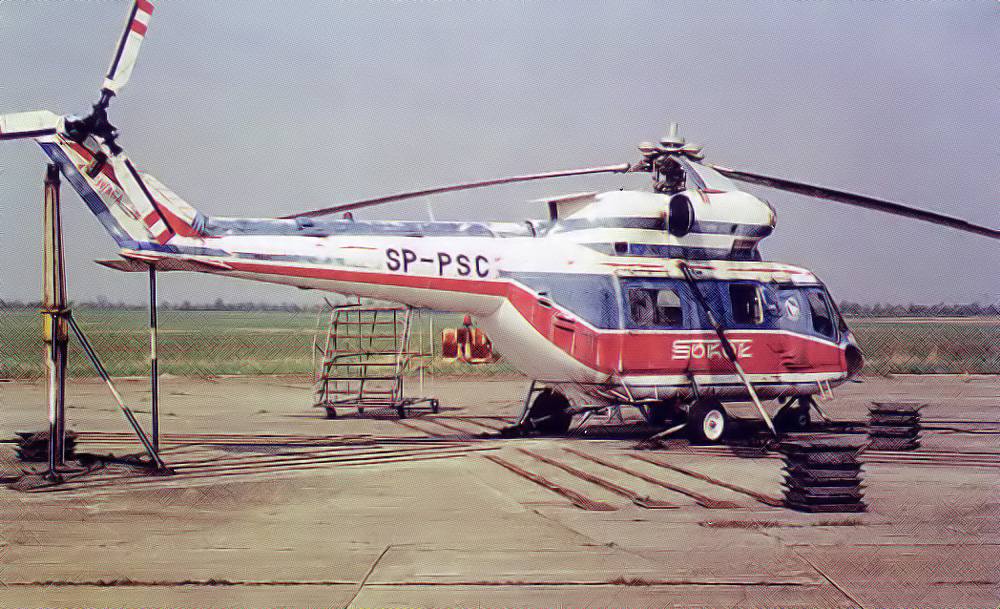
PZL W-3 fourth prototype

In 1973, work commenced on what would become the W-3 Sokół at PZL Świdnik. The design was created by an in-house team led by aeronautical engineer Stanisław Kamiński. The Soviet Air Force and Aeroflot were intended as the primary operators of the aircraft. On 16 November 1979, the first five prototypes of Sokół conducted their maiden flights.

=== Early production ===
Production began in 1985 when ten aircraft were built during that year. The first model, registered as SP-PSF, conducted its maiden flight in 1987.

The Soviet Chief Inspectorate of Civil Aviation issued a provisional airworthiness certificate on 26 September 1988 for the W-3 Sokól, permitting expanded serial production of the aircraft. At the same time, work began on a rescue variant and an armed version.

The second production series consisted of 23 helicopters and two fuselage airframes allocated for testing. The first aircraft of this series, designated as the State Radio Inspectorate variant, featured a specialized antenna mast.

On March 17, 1990, the prototype W-3U Salamandra (factory number 360317) was flown, planned to be armed with Mars-2, B8-10, and ZR-8 pods, along with the 9M114 guided missile system from the Mil Mi-24W and the GSz-23L fixed cannon. Following testing, the Polish military decided to not adopt the aircraft. Consequently, the helicopter was stripped of its armament and reconfigured as a transport variant, which was subsequently exported to Myanmar. Several years later, in cooperation with the South African arms company Denel, work was once again on an armed version. Factory number 310318 was registered as SP-SUW and transported to South Africa, where Kentron integrated its weapons systems and armament, resulting in the W-3K variant. The aircraft was then registered as ZU-AGU and underwent testing until 1994. The same aircraft, which again flew in Poland as SP-SUW, was tested with French HOT-3/VIVIANE missiles in 1999.

The third series consisted of 19 helicopters and one fuselage intended for ground tests. Nine of them were purchased by the Burmese Air Force. The machine with the serial number 390411 remained in the factory, constituting the basis for the construction of the W-3RM prototype. Factory number 330414 was assigned to the 103rd Aviation Regiment of the Ministry of Internal Affairs. Following the Polish governmental restructuring of 1990, the aircraft (re-designated SN-30XG, replacing the earlier designation PL-30XG) were transferred to the Border Guard. In 1993, one of the machines in the W-3T version with the side number 0417 entered the equipment of the Polish Army. It was later reintroduced as W-3RL.

=== 1990s-after Cold War ===
Following the democratization of Poland and the end of the Cold War, PZL-Świdnik began operating in the West. In 1989, design work began on a new variant. The third series of helicopter, with the serial number 310420, became the platform for the construction of the W-3A prototype. The first W-3A helipcoter made its maiden flight on July 30, 1992.

Following an intensive test program, type certification for the helicopter was received from aviation authorities in Poland, Russia, the United States, and Germany. During May 1993, certification of the W-3A to standards was granted. The W-3A obtained an American certificate on May 31, 1993, from the Federal Aviation Administration (FAA) confirming compliance with FAR Part 29 regulations. It was followed by the receipt of German certification in December of that year.

Subsequently, the aircraft was registered as SP-PSK and later SP-SSK, before being transferred to the 103rd Aviation Regiment of the Ministry of Internal Affairs. It is currently in service with the Police of Poland.

The fourth series consisted of 20 helicopters. The Saxony State Police received one W-3A (factory no. 370503), the South Korean companies Helikorea and Citi Air purchased W-3A (factory no. 370509) and W-3AM (factory no. 370514) respectively. In June 1996, the 100th Sokół was completed by the company.

The Polish Air Force rebuilt one of the received Sokółs (factory no. 310502) to W-3RL and transferred it to the Polish Mountain Rescue Service (GORP). The Navy received helicopters from this series factory no. 390505 and 390513 as W-3RM. Anaconda (serial number 390510) was also given to 103rd PL MSW. It then became part of the equipment of the GROM Military Unit. It crashed during exercises.

Aircraft 370507 (registered as SP-SXZ) initially served with the Life Saving Association (LPR), a water safety and lifeguard training organization in Poland. From 1995, it was used seasonally by Tatra Volunteer Search and Rescue (TOPR) while retaining LPR livery. Following damage sustained during an emergency landing near Murzasichle on 29 January 2003, the aircraft was refurbished, re-registered as SP-SXW, and transferred to TOPR's full operational control with updated livery.

The SP-PSL helicopter (serial number 370508) became the basis for building the W-3A2 prototype, which was purchased by the Spanish company Helibravo. Aircraft SP-FSU (factory number 370515) was operated by the Polish subsidiary of Daewoo for several years. Following the company's financial difficulties, this aircraft was sold to the police force of the United Arab Emirates. The remaining helicopters went mainly to the Polish Army.

=== Huzar derivative ===
During the 1990s, PZL-Świdnik heavily pursued the development of an envisioned Huzar battlefield helicopter, which was to be based on the airframe of the W-3 Sokoł and would have eventually involved the manufacture of 100 attack helicopters under a tentative $350 million contract for the Polish Army. Although PZL-Świdnik initiated the program, development was hampered by repeated delays and financial constraints. The company struggled to secure government funding, which was necessary to proceed with successive development phases. When a contract for the helicopter's avionics and weapon systems was awarded within a government memorandum of understanding (MoU) to an Israeli consortium, consisting of armaments manufacturer Rafael Advanced Defense Systems and defense electronics company Elbit Systems, making them the intended supplier for both the missiles and avionics for the helicopter.

During 1998, the Polish Council of Ministers issued its recommendation for the launch of a new tender in support of the envisioned Huzar. In response, calls were issued for an avionics and weapons systems integrator, aiming to replace the originally selected Israeli consortium due to alleged irregularities in the previous selection process. American aerospace company Boeing, which led its own bid involving in excess of 20 separate companies, represented Elbit's chief competitor for the integration contract; at one point, it appeared that political changes regarding the competitors had made Boeing the favorite to win the contract. While Rafael's NT-D anti-tank missile was selected, this was subject to the successful completion of several test launches; if it failed, rival bids from Boeing for the AGM-114 Hellfire, British firm GEC-Marconi with the Brimstone and the Franko-German company Euromissile's HOT 3 missile. The Israeli Government resisted breaking up its consortium for a separate avionics integration contract, stating it would refuse to release the NT-D missile unless it was also awarded the avionics bid, but reportedly softened on this stance.

In mid-1999, the Polish government's plans for the Huzar helicopter were entirely abandoned, effectively ending development of the derivative immediately. In its place, a smaller fleet of W-3 Sokoł, modified for a support role, was adopted in the short term instead. Bids to upgrade 50 rotorcraft, including the adoption of new rotor blades, more powerful engines, extra fuel tanks, and additional armaments, were issued thereafter. At the time, Polish Prime Minister Jerzy Buzek stated that, for the long term requirement, a new tender for attack helicopter was to be issued by the end of June that year, and that "we expect a decision in October or November"; the envisioned competition was to be contested by the Italian Agusta A129 Mangusta, the American Bell AH-1W/Z Super Cobra and Boeing AH-64 Apache, the European Eurocopter Tiger and South African Denel Rooivalk attack helicopters. Poland ultimately chose to pursue a relatively modest stopgap plan to upgrade its existing Mil Mi-24 fleet with Israeli-built equipment.

=== Further development ===
During the early 2000s, PLZ Swidnik issued an offer for the upgrade of 12 Sokołs previously operated by the Polish Air Force in the training role, converting them to perform the search and rescue mission instead; amongst the changes involved was the installation of Rockwell Collins-built ARC-210 transceivers and the adoption of new night-vision goggles (NVG)-compatible cockpits. In 2006, this offer was met with a corresponding contract, which would ultimately led to the production of an improved model of the rotorcraft, designated as the W-3PL Gluszec; in addition to the above improvements, a new flight control system and upgraded powerplants featuring full authority digital engine control (FADEC) software, were adopted, along with various changes to the communication, navigation and self-protection systems. The variant, which had been developed partially based upon combat experience gained in Iraq, attracted the attention of the Polish land forces, leading to discussions on modernising additional W-3 helicopters to the Gluszec standard. By January 2012, a follow-up order for another four Sokołs re-built to the W-3PL configuration had been issued.

During the mid-2000s, it was reported that, as part of a wider proposed industrial partnership between PLZ Swidnik and Indonesian aircraft company Indonesian Aerospace (IAe), discussions on the potential outsourcing of manufacturing work on the Sokoł helicopter, focused on the airframe and some of the subassemblies, were held; it was also stated that a wider licensing agreement in respect to the Sokoł had already been ruled out as IAe were not prepared to accept responsibility for marketing and sales for the helicopter.

Following Anglo-Italian helicopter manufacturer AgustaWestland's acquisition of PZL Swidnik, the W-3 Sokoł was incorporated into the new parent company's product line and has continued to be marketed and sold.

== Operational history ==
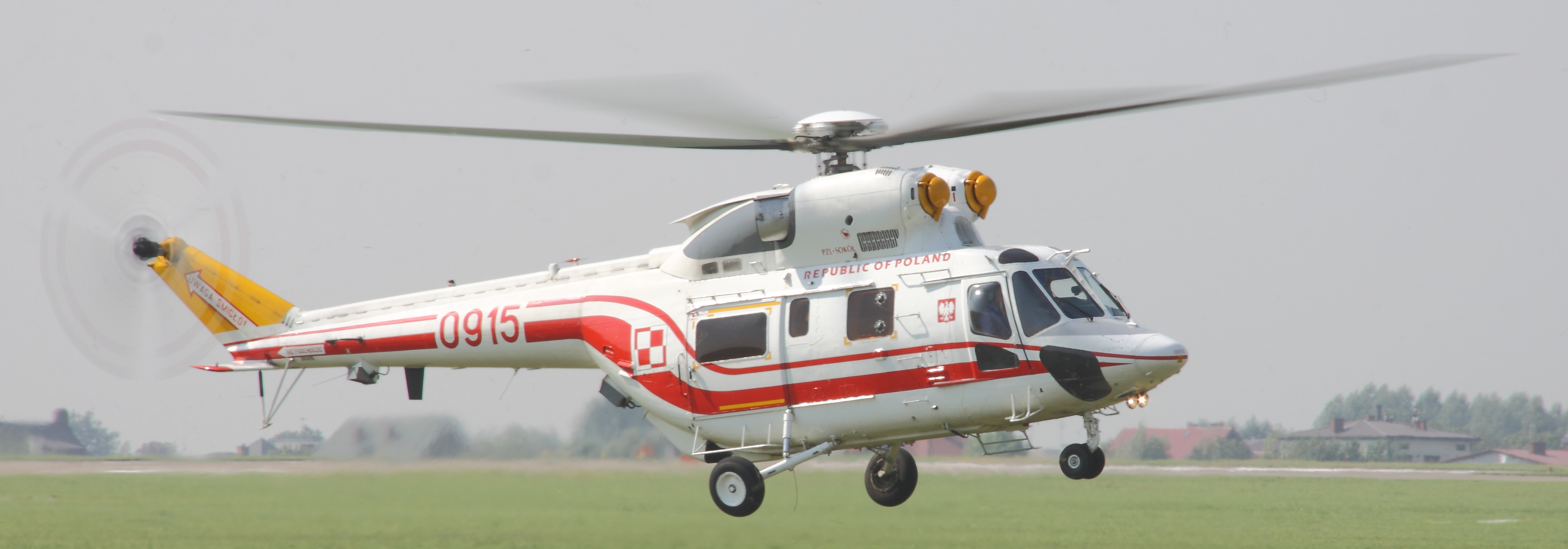
Polish Air Force W-3 Sokół in Polish government livery

The first civilian export customer for the W-3A variant of the type was Germany's Saxony State Police.

In 1995, South Korean operator Citiair issued a firm order for the purchase of three transport-oriented W-3A Sokół helicopters. Citiair fitted various additional equipment on the type, including floats, as two of them were to routinely travel to the island of Ulleungdo, roughly 180 km (110 miles) from the Korean mainland, while the third was to be operated in the nation's more mountainous regions. During the same year, Polish oil company Petrobaltic ordered a single W-3RM Anaconda maritime helicopter. While primarily designed for search and rescue (SAR) duties, it was used by the company for transporting personnel, supplies and equipment to its Baltic oil drilling platforms.

The Polish military has been a key customer for the Sokoł. During the mid-1990s, a 15-year modernisation plan called for the procurement of 90 transport-oriented Sokołs, along with 100 Huzar battlefield helicopters (a later-cancelled derivative of the Sokoł). During early 1996, Poland exchanged a batch of 11 W-3 Sokółs with the neighbouring Czech Republic in exchange for 10 Mikoyan MiG-29. W-3RM Anaconda maritime helicopters were adopted by the Polish naval service, who used the type to perform the SAR role.

From 2003 onwards, four W-3WA helicopters of the Polish Independent Air Attack Group (Polish: Samodzielna Grupa Powietrzno-Szturmowa) operated in Iraq in support of coalition operations. In total, eight Polish helicopters were deployed to the region until 2008. In summer 2004, Polish W-3 helicopters participated in coalition information operations, distributing leaflets intended to counter support for Iraqi Shia cleric Muqtada al-Sadr. On 15 December 2004, a W-3WA operating with the Polish contingent in Iraq crashed near Karbala, killing three crew members and wounding three others On 18 July 2006, another helicopter crashed at an air base in Al Diwaniyah, injuring 4 crew and 3 passengers.

Since January 2012, a force of five W-3 Sokoł helicopters, along with six Mil Mi-8, have been furnished with a VIP configuration for use by the Polish government. They are stationed at Poland's 1st Air Transport Base in Warsaw.

== Variants ==
=== Civil versions ===
Civil production versions.

W-3 Sokół
Basic civil multi-purpose version, 30 built (excluding prototypes).
W-3A Sokół
Version with FAR-29 certificate. At least 9 civil helicopters built.
W-3AS Sokół
W-3 airframe converted to W-3A standard, 22 converted.
W-3A2 Sokół
Version with two-axis Smith SN 350 autopilot, one built.
W-3AM Sokół
Civil version with floats, 13 built.
W-3 Erka
Ambulance variant, one built in 1988

=== Military versions ===
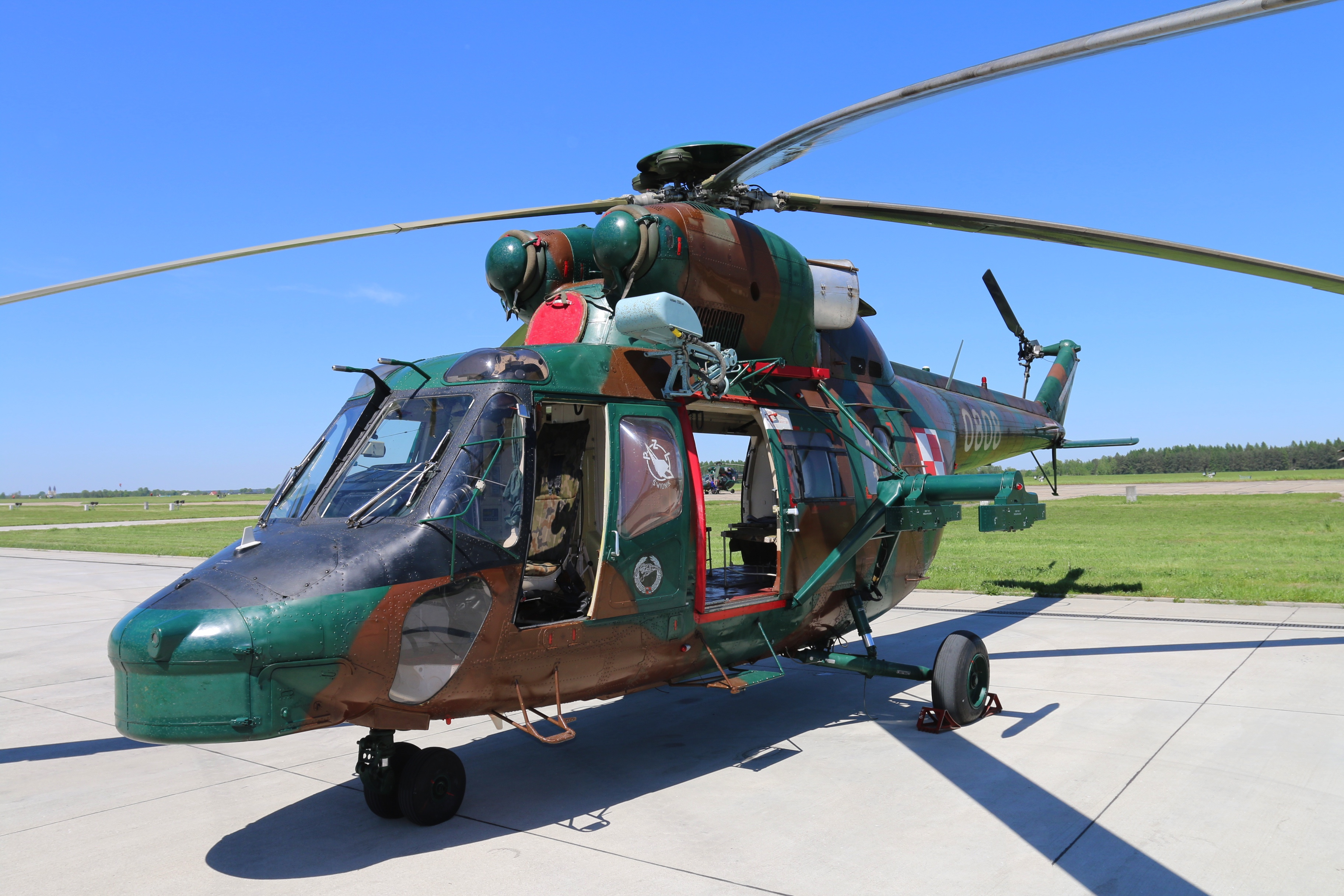
W-3WA – armed version of the 7th Aviation Squadron in Nowy Glinnik

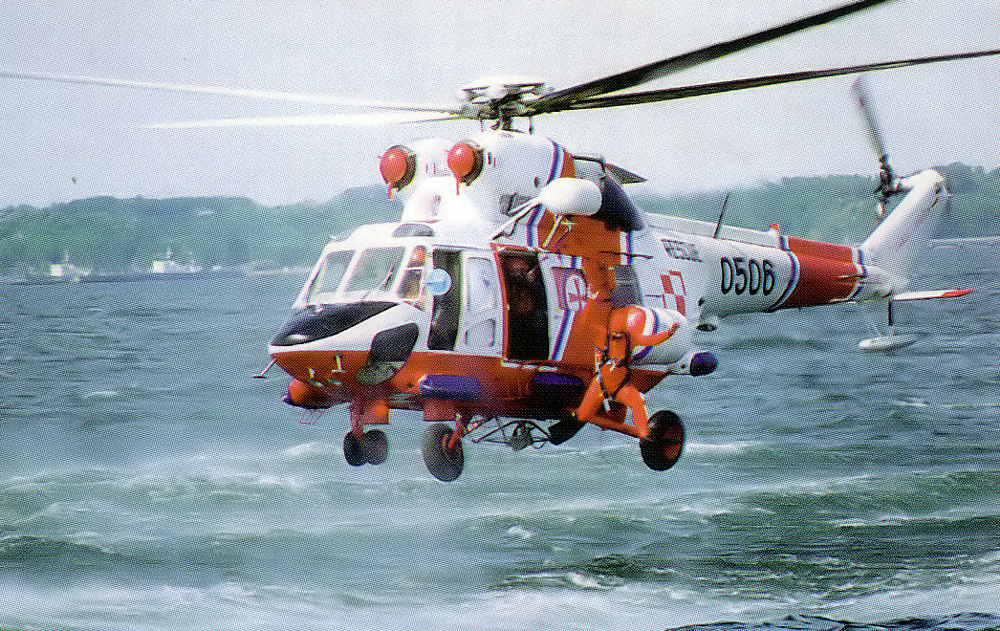
PZL W-3RM Anakonda of Polish Navy

Military production versions.

W-3 / W-3T / W-3P Sokół
Basic (unarmed) transport/passenger variant used by Polish Air Force (6), Navy (2) and Myanmar Air Force (13, inc. two for VIP).
W-3A Sokół
Military transport variant of the W-3A version used by Czech (11) and Philippine Air Force (8). Some of the Czech helicopters were modified for the emergency medical services. Filipino examples can carry M60 machine gun on each side. Iraqi Air Force returned two VIP-configured Sokół to the intermediary company after cancelling the order.
W-3P/S/A VIP Sokół
VIP transport version used by Polish Air Force. Eight built.
W-3W/WA Sokół
Armed version, with twin 23 mm GSz-23Ł cannon and four pylons for weapons used by Polish Land Forces. W-3WA is a variant with FAR-29 certificate. 34 built.
W-3AE Sokół
Medical evacuation version used by Polish Land Forces (AE for "Aero Ewakuacja"). Three W-3WA upgraded.
W-3R Sokół
Medical evacuation version used by Polish Air Force. Two built.
W-3RL Sokół
Land search and rescue version used by Polish Air Force. Six built.
W-3RM Anakonda
"Anakonda" (en: "Anaconda") Navalized search and rescue version used by Polish Navy. One prototype and eight production aircraft built from 1991 to 2002.
W-3WARM Anakonda
Modernised search and rescue helicopter for Polish Navy, with upgraded and standardised equipment. Eight helicopters (two W-3 and six W-3RM) upgraded, re-entering service from 2017 to 2020.
W-3PSOT / W-3PPD Gipsówka
"Gipsówka" (en: "Gypsophila") W-3PPD was a flying command centre variant (PPD stands for "Powietrzny Punkt Dowodzenia" – "Airborne Command Post"). In 2006, this variant received new digital battlefield (after modernization helicopter is able to guide artillery equipped with Topaz fire control system) and observation systems and was adopted by Polish Land Forces Aviation under new name W-3PSOT (PSOT stands for "Powietrzne Stanowisko Obserwacji Terenu" – "Airborne Observation Post"). This variant accommodates weapon pylons identical to those on the W-3W but retains only a pilot-controlled 12.7 mm machine gun rather than the twin 23 mm cannon installation. One built.
W-3RR Procjon
"Procjon" (en: "Procyon") is a radioelectronic reconnaissance version (RR stands for "Rozpoznanie Radioelektroniczne" – "Radioelectronic Reconnaissance"). Three built.
W-3PL Głuszec
"Głuszec" (en: "Capercaillie") is a PZL W-3WA upgrade program to bring armed variant of Sokół up to 21st century standards by including advanced avionic systems (in Glass cockpit configuration) and other changes like FADEC-equipped engines. Avionics include two 10″ MFD displays, single tactical display (maps and Elbit Toplite FLIR), INS/GPS, TACAN, VOR/ILS, DME navigation, HUD, IFF, PNL-3 night vision goggles, HOCAS (Hands on Collective and Stick) control, infrared and radar warning receiver, MIL-STD-1553B data link. Twin 23 mm cannon was replaced by single pilot's controlled 12,7 mm WKM-Bz machine gun with 350 rounds. Designed for Combat Search and Rescue duties. The first prototype (s/n: 360901) was tested by the Land Forces aviation in 2009. Eight W-3WA are to be upgraded.

=== Prototypes and proposals ===
Prototypes and proposals that were not adopted by armed forces.

W-3B Jastrząb
Proposed armed version with tandem-seat cabin and guided AT rockets.
W-3K/W-3WB Huzar
Proposed armed version with guided ZT3 Ingwe ATGM, FLIR and 20 mm GA-1 cannon with helmet-mounted sight. Modification by Kentron (Denel) company in 1993 tested in South Africa. Some elements like hardpoint were used in serial W-3W/W-3WA variant. One built.
W-3L Sokół Long
Proposed stretched version seating up to 14 passengers, mockup only.
W-3MS/W-3WS Sokół
Proposed gunship version.
W-3U Salamandra
Armed version, with avionics and armament from Mi-24W. Only one built, later converted into transport variant and sold to Myanmar.
W-3U-1 Aligator
Proposed anti-submarine version.
W-3PL/N
Proposed navalised version of W-3PL with folding rotor, radar, dipping sonar, air-to-surface missiles and torpedoes.

== Operators ==
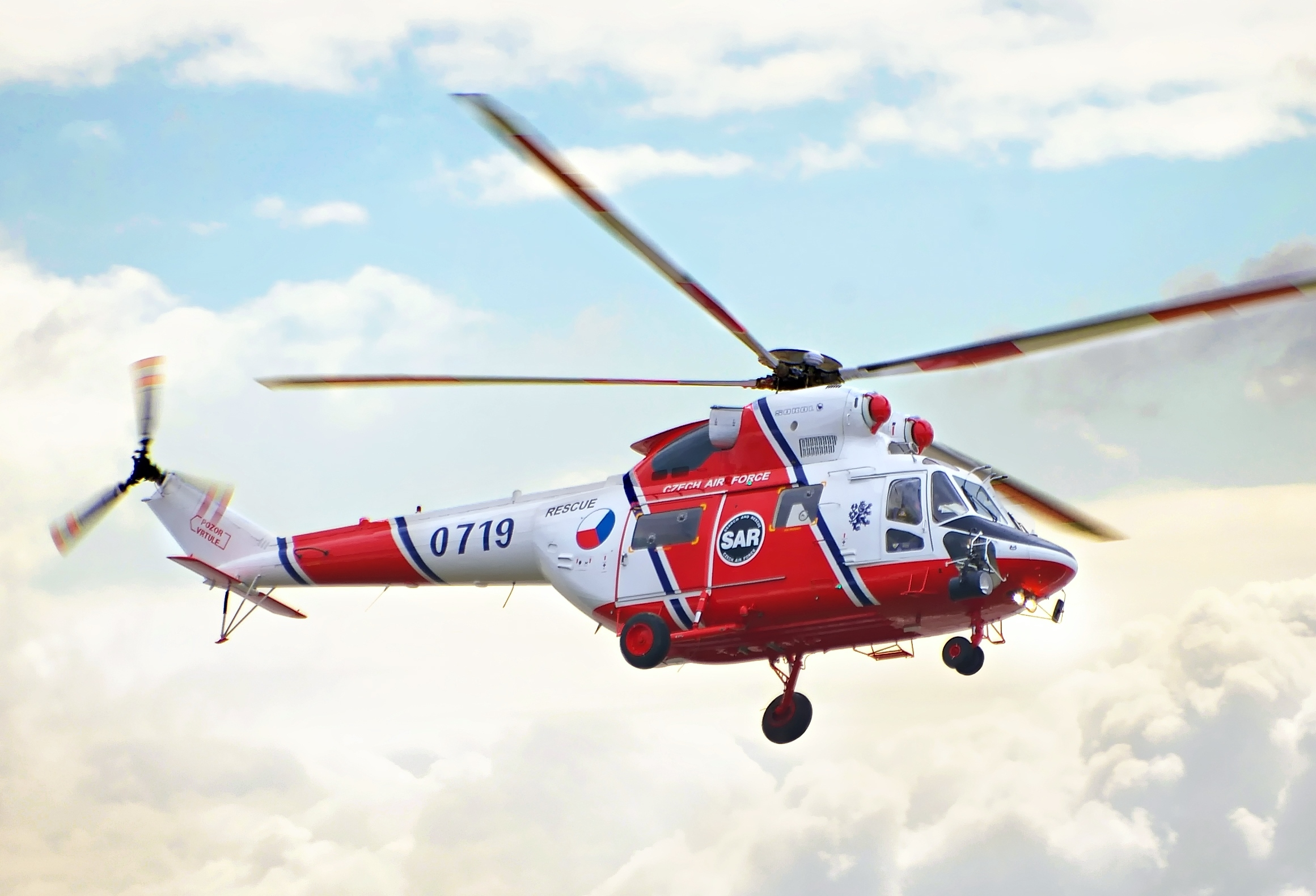
Czech Air Force PZL W-3A search and rescue helicopter

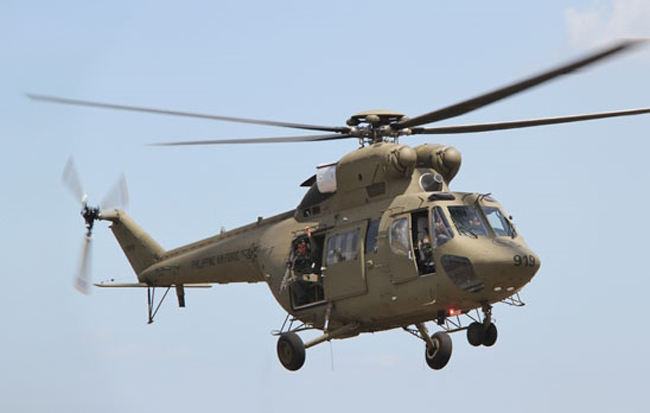
A Philippine Air Force W-3A Sokoł on combat helicopter paint scheme before all units were transferred to search and rescue role.

Algeria

- Algerian Air Force- 8 Units.

Chile

- Corporación Nacional Forestal

Czech Republic

- Czech Air Force- 10 Units

Myanmar

- Myanmar Air Force - 12 Units.

Philippines

- Philippine Air Force - 5 Units Active out of 8 delivered in 2012.

Poland

- Polish Air Force -15 Units
- Polish Border Guard
- Polish Land Forces- 38 Units.
- Polish Navy- 8 Units.
- Polish Police
- Tatra Volunteer Search and Rescue

South Korea

- Fire Department of Choong Nam

Uganda

- Uganda National Police (1 on order)

=== Former operators ===
Germany

- Landespolizei

Portugal

- Helibravo Aviação

United Arab Emirates

Ras Al Khaimah Police

Spain

- Helibravo a W-3A2 (serial number 370508) and a W-3AM (370705).
- Hispánica de Aviación owns 9 aircraft: 5 W-3AS, 3 W-3AM and a W-3A.
- Xunta de Galicia for firefighting operations.

== Specifications (W-3A) ==
Data from Jane's All The World's Aircraft 2003–2004, PZL-Świdnik

General characteristics

- Crew: 2
- Capacity: 12 passengers or four stretcher cases and one attendant / 2,100 kg (4,630 lb) payload
- Length: 14.21 m (46 ft 7 in) fuselage
- Height: 5.14 m (16 ft 10 in)
- Empty weight: 3,850 kg (8,488 lb)
- Max takeoff weight: 6,400 kg (14,110 lb)
- Powerplant: 2 × Pratt & Whitney Rzeszów PZL-10B turboshaft engines, 671 kW (900 hp) each
- Main rotor diameter: 15.7 m (51 ft 6 in)
- Main rotor area: 193.6 m^{2} (2,084 sq ft) with NACA 23012M blade profile

Performance

- Cruise speed: 238 km/h (148 mph, 129 kn)
- Never exceed speed: 260 km/h (160 mph, 140 kn)
- Range: 745 km (463 mi, 402 nmi)
- Ferry range: 1,224 km (761 mi, 661 nmi)
- Service ceiling: 4,910 m (16,110 ft)
- Rate of climb: 9.3 m/s (1,830 ft/min)

== See also ==
- PZL Kania

Aircraft of comparable role, configuration, and era

- Bell 212
- Kazan Ansat
- Mil Mi-2
