= PZL Kania =

Polish helicopter

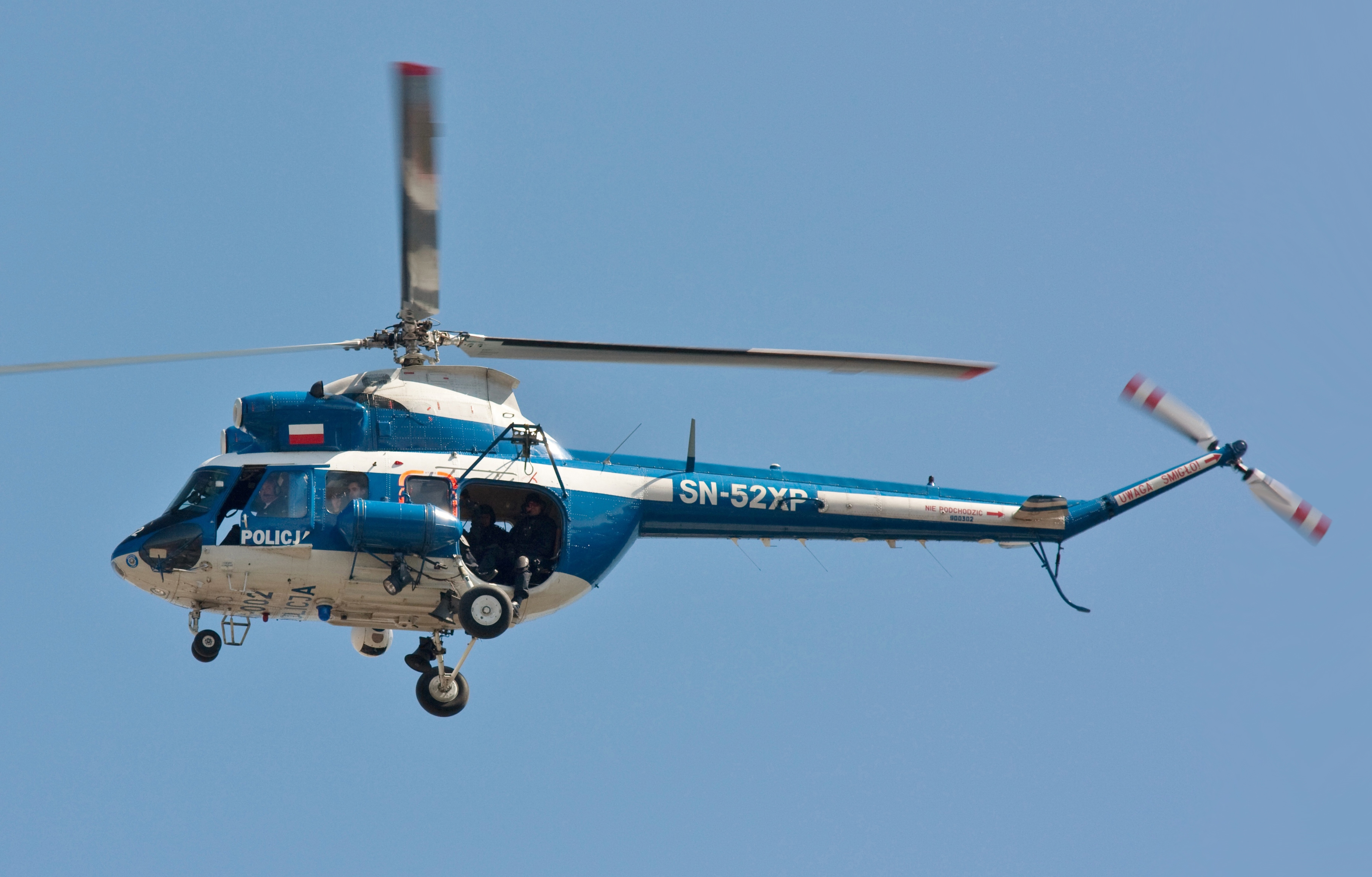
- PZL Kania of the Polish Police

General information
- Type: Helicopter
- Manufacturer: PZL-Świdnik
- Primary user: Poland
- Number built: 19

History
- Manufactured: 1986–2006
- First flight: 3 June 1979
- Developed from: Mil Mi-2

The PZL Kania (Polish Kite, also marketed as Kitty Hawk) is a follow-up design to the Mil Mi-2 helicopter, developed in Poland by PZL-Świdnik.

== Design and development ==
In 1964, an agreement was signed between Poland and the Soviet Union assigning production of the Mil Mi-2 twin-engined light helicopter exclusively to the WSK PZL-Świdnik factory at Świdnik, Poland.

Work on a significantly redesigned version of the Mi-2 started in 1977. PZL decided to develop, in conjunction with the American aero-engine company Allison, a re-engined version for export for western markets, the Kania or Kitty Hawk. The changes include a modified fuselage with more pointed nose, new engines (Allison Model 250-C20B turboshaft engines) each rated at 313 kW (420 hp), new composite rotor blades, and new western avionics. The first prototype, utilizing a modified Mi-2 airframe, was flown on 3 June 1979. Two prototypes were made and two pre-series machines. Tests conducted during the early 1980s led to certification according to FAR-29, in February 1986.

The prototype SP-SSC took part in the 5th Helicopter World Championships in Castle Ashby in 1986. Production started that year in limited quantity, in the PZL Świdnik factory. The helicopter was intended to be a replacement of the Mi-2, more economical, comfortable and offering better performance, and it compared quite favourably with Western counterparts. It did not become popular, however, partly due to problems with certification and a weak promotion in Western countries, and reluctance to spend convertible currency for imported parts in Eastern Bloc countries in the 1980s. Only 19 were built until 2006, including prototypes. It isn't currently offered by PZL-Świdnik.

The main user is the Polish Border Guard, with 7 helicopters (not concurrently). The Polish Police used two helicopters. Three Polish Kanias were employed in air service in Sierra Leone in 1987–1990. In 2007, Świdnik offered 6 armed Kanias for Philippine Air Force, but lost in competition (finally, after cancelling a procedure, PZL W-3 Sokół was chosen).

== Variants ==
Passenger Standard
Seats for pilot and 9 passengers, individual vents and lighting.
Passenger Executive
Seats for pilot and 5 passengers, luxury finishing, silenced cockpit, individual vents, lighting and audio system.
Cargo
Ability to carry 800 kg (1,764 lb) external loads as a flying crane or to carry up to 1,200 kg (2,646 lb) of load in the cabin.
Medevac / Air ambulance
Equipment and space for up to 4 stretchers or less with paramedic crew on board.
Agricultural
Ability to carry up to 1,000 kg (2,205 lb) of chemicals or agro loads (grains, seeds etc.) and ability to carry on one of following aerial application methods: LV spraying, ULV spraying, dustring and spreading (not built in series, only tested).
Spitfire Taurus II or Super Kania
American version of the PZL Kania, with redesigned fuselage and single 550 shp (410 kW) Allison Model 250-C28 engine, with a big central air inlet, that was to be built under licence in the United States by Spitfire Helicopters but only a mock-up was built.

== Operators ==
Cyprus

- Cyprus Air Forces

Poland

- Border Guard

Slovakia

- Air Transport Europe

== Specifications ==
Data from Jane's All The World's Aircraft 1988–89

General characteristics

- Crew: 1 or 2
- Capacity: 8 or 9 / 1,200 kg (2,646 lb) internal payload, 800 kg (1,764 lb) slung load / 1,000 kg (2,205 lb) chemicals
- Length: 17.47 m (57 ft 4 in) overall

12.03 m (39 ft) fuselage only

- Height: 3.75 m (12 ft 4 in) to top of rotor head
- Empty weight: 2,000 kg (4,409 lb)
- Gross weight: 3,350 kg (7,385 lb)
- Max takeoff weight: 3,550 kg (7,826 lb)
- Fuel capacity: 600 L (160 US gal; 130 imp gal) standard internal fuel, with provision for additional 423 L (112 US gal; 93 imp gal) in auxiliary tanks
- Powerplant: 2 × Allison 250-C20B turboshaft engines, 313 kW (420 hp) each
- Main rotor diameter: 14.558 m (47 ft 9 in)
- Main rotor area: 166.5 m^{2} (1,792 sq ft)
- Blade section: NACA 23012M

Performance

- Cruise speed: 215 km/h (134 mph, 116 kn) maximum cruise
- Economical cruise speed: 190 km/h (120 mph; 100 kn)
- Range: 430 km (270 mi, 230 nmi) internal fuel, econ cruise, with 30 minutes reserve

493 km (306 mi; 266 nmi) internal fuel, econ cruise, with no reserve

- Ferry range: 800 km (500 mi, 430 nmi) maximum fuel, with 30 minutes reserve

863 km (536 mi; 466 nmi) maximum fuel, econ cruise, with no reserve

- Service ceiling: 4,000 m (13,000 ft)
- Hover ceiling IGE: 2,500 m (8,200 ft)
- Hover ceiling OGE: 1,375 m (4,500 ft)
- Rate of climb: 8.75 m/s (1,700 ft/min)
- Maximum rate of climb on one engine: 1 m/s (3.3 ft/s)

== See also ==
Related development

- Mil Mi-2
- PZL W-3 Sokół
