= AgustaWestland =

European helicopter manufacturer from 2000 to 2016

AgustaWestland S.p.A.
- Type: Subsidiary
- Industry: Aircraft
- Predecessors: Agusta; Westland Helicopters
- Founded: 2000
- Defunct: 2016 (aged 15–16) (merged into Leonardo S.p.A.)
- Successor: Leonardo Helicopters
- Headquarters: Rome, Italy
- Key people: Daniele Romiti (chief executive officer)
- Products: Helicopters
- Revenue: €4,243 million (2012)
- Operating income: €473 million (2012)
- Number of employees: 12,500 (at 31 December 2015)
- Parent: Finmeccanica
- Subsidiaries: PZL-Świdnik
- Website: helicopters.leonardo.com

AgustaWestland was an Anglo-Italian helicopter design and manufacturing company, which was a wholly owned subsidiary of Finmeccanica (now Leonardo). It was formed in July 2000 as an Anglo-Italian multinational company, when Finmeccanica and GKN merged their respective helicopter subsidiaries (Agusta and Westland Helicopters) to form AgustaWestland, with each holding a 50% share. Finmeccanica acquired GKN's stake in AgustaWestland in 2004.

In 2016, AgustaWestland was merged into Leonardo S.p.A. (formerly Finmeccanica), where it became the company's helicopters division under the Leonardo Helicopters brand.

== History ==
The collaboration between Agusta and Westland dates back to 1981, when the two companies established the European Helicopter Industries joint venture with the aim of developing a new medium-size utility helicopter, the EH101.

In March 1999, Finmeccanica and GKN announced their intention to merge their respective helicopter subsidiaries. The two parties announced finalised terms for the merger in July 2000, which included a 50-50 ownership structure, and the payment of top-up fees to GKN to compensate for a disparity in profit levels between Agusta and Westland.

In January 2002, AgustaWestland announced that it would be cutting a total of 950 jobs in the United Kingdom and closing its factory in Weston-super-Mare, which carried out customer support work, as activity was concentrated at its main site in Yeovil.

On 26 May 2004, GKN confirmed that it had agreed to sell its share of AgustaWestland to Finmeccanica for £1.06 billion. The sale was approved by the British government in October 2004.

AgustaWestland opened offices in Philadelphia in 2005 and won a contract to build the new presidential helicopter Marine One over the U.S. manufacturer Sikorsky Aircraft, but this program was cancelled in 2009. In November 2005, it was announced that AgustaWestland had agreed to acquire Bell Helicopter's 25 per cent interest in the AB139 medium twin helicopter program, and to increase its interest in the BA609 civil tiltrotor aircraft from 25 per cent to 40 per cent.

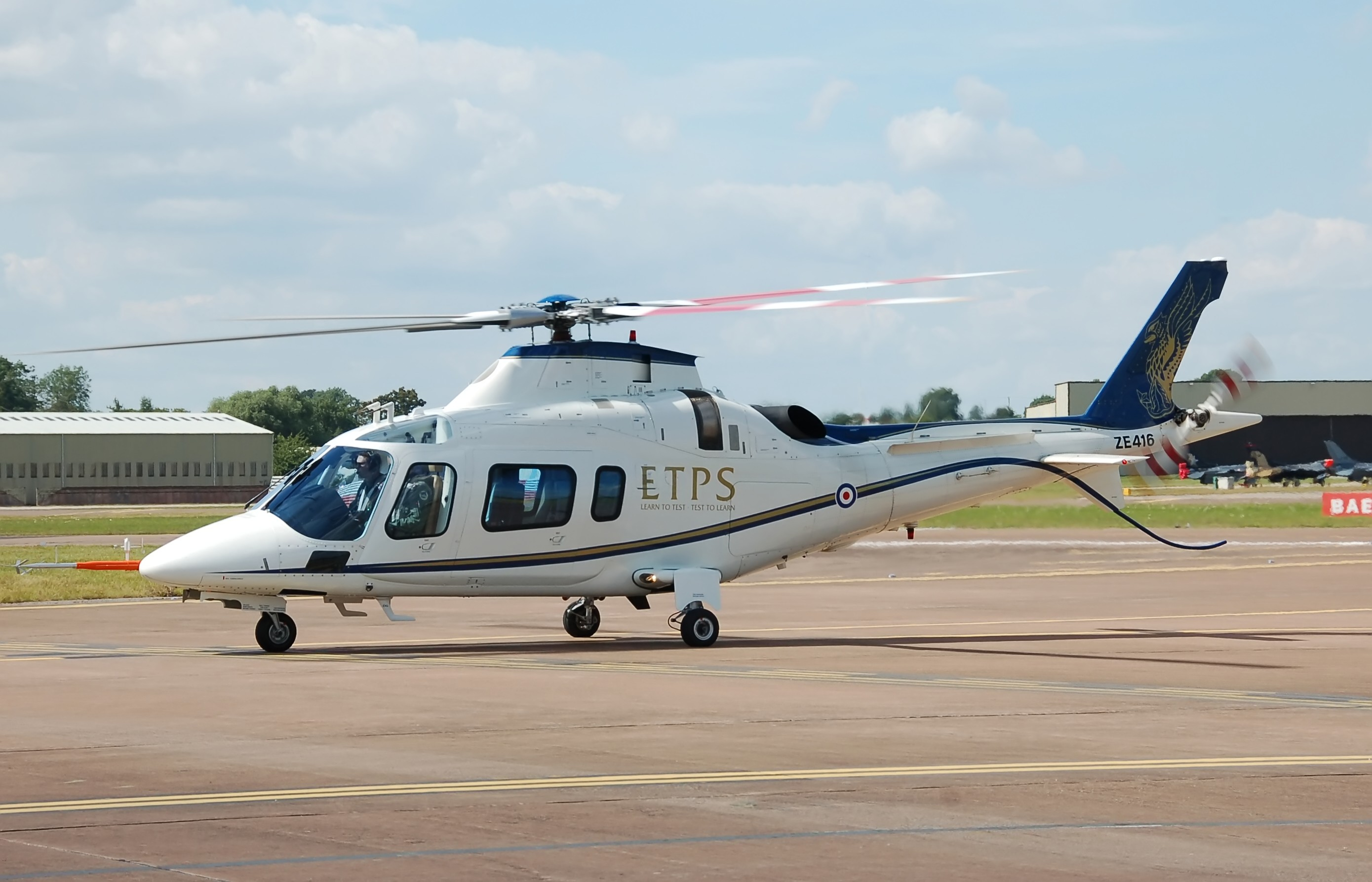
Qinetiq AgustaWestland AW109E Power arrives for the 2014 Royal International Air Tattoo, England

In June 2008, AgustaWestland and the Russia-based helicopter manufacturer Russian Helicopters agreed to form a new joint venture company to assemble AW139 helicopters in Russia. Construction of a $50 million helicopter assembly facility in the town of Tomilino near Moscow began in June 2010.

In early 2010, AgustaWestland acquired PZL-Świdnik, a Polish helicopter manufacturer.

In September 2012, AgustaWestland and Northrop Grumman announced the signing of a comprehensive teaming agreement under which the companies would jointly bid for contracts to build the U.S. Air Force Combat Rescue helicopter and U.S. Navy's new "Marine One" presidential helicopter.

In March 2013, AgustaWestland announced its Project Zero hybrid tiltrotor/fan-in-wing technology demonstrator. The unmanned demonstrator made its first tethered flight in June 2011 at AgustaWestland's Cascina Costa, Italy facility. According to the company, the aircraft "employs no hydraulics, doesn't burn fossil fuel and generates zero emissions."

=== AgustaWestland AW101 order controversy ===
India signed a contract to purchase 12 AgustaWestland AW101 helicopters in February 2010 for the Communication Squadron of Indian Air Force to carry the president, PM and other VVIPs. The contract was frozen in February 2013 after allegations surfaced that US$60 million had been paid as a bribe. On 12 February 2013, Giuseppe Orsi, the CEO of Finmeccanica, was arrested by Italian authorities; the following day Indian Defence Minister A.K. Antony ordered a probe into the contract.

In January 2014, India cancelled the US$630 million deal, subsequently recovering the sum which it had paid. Orsi was fully acquitted of all charges by the Italian judiciary in 2019.

=== Merger into Leonardo ===
In 2016, following a corporate reorganisation, AgustaWestland merged into Leonardo S.p.A., Finmeccanica's new name. With this reorganisation, AgustaWestland ceased to exist as a separate company, and it became Leonardo's helicopter division.

In 2020 Leonardo relaunched the "Agusta" brand for the VIP helicopter sector. The launch of the new brand was announced during Expo 2020 in Dubai.

== Products ==
Model	First flight	Production status	MTOW	Description
Agusta A129 Mangusta	1983-09-11	present	4.6t	attack helicopter
AgustaWestland Apache	1998-09	2004	9.5t	attack helicopter, GKN-Westland license of the AH-64 Apache, 67 built for the British Army
AgustaWestland AW101/EH101 (Merlin)	1987-10-09	present	14.6t	three-engine medium-lift helicopter
AgustaWestland AW109	1971-08-04	present	2.85t	eight seats twin-engine
AgustaWestland AW109S Grand	1988	present	3.175t	AW109 stretch
AgustaWestland AW119 Koala	1995-02	present	2.85t	eight seats single-engine, development of AW109
AgustaWestland AW139	2001-02-03	present	7t	15-seat twin-engine (former Bell/Agusta AB139)
AgustaWestland AW149	2009-11-13	present	8.6t	medium-lift military helicopter
AgustaWestland AW159 Wildcat	2009-11-12	present	6t	Lynx development
AgustaWestland AW169	2012-05-10	present	4.8t	10-seat twin-engine
AgustaWestland AW189	2011-12-21	present	8.3t	twin-engine medium-lift helicopter
AgustaWestland AW249	2022-08-12	present	7t	attack helicopter, A129 replacement
AgustaWestland AW609	2003-03-06	present	7.62t	tiltrotor (former Bell/Agusta BA609)
AgustaWestland CH-149 Cormorant	2000-05-31	present	14.6t	AW101 Canadian air-sea rescue designation
AgustaWestland Project Zero	2011-06	present	?	hybrid tiltrotor/fan-in-wing demonstrator
Bell-Agusta 412	1979-08	present	5.4t	licensed twin-engine
Boeing MH-139 Grey Wolf	2019-01	present	7t	military helicopter, a development of AW139 with Boeing
Kopter AW09	2014-10	present	2.65t	former SH09
Leonardo Proteus	mid-2025 (planned)	present	2.8-3t	uncrewed rotorcraft developed primarily for the Royal Navy
Lockheed Martin VH-71 Kestrel	2007-07-03	2009	14.6t	cancelled USMC Marine One AW101 VIP variant with Lockheed Martin and Bell Helicopter)
NHI NH90	1995-12-18	present	10.6t	twin-engine military helicopter (NHIndustries is 62.5% Eurocopter, 32% AgustaWestland and 5.5% Fokker Aerostructures)
PZL W-3 Sokół	1979-11-16	2015	6.4t	twin-engine
PZL SW-4	1996-10-29	present	1.8t	single-engine
TAI/AgustaWestland T-129	2009-09-28	present	5t	attack helicopter, a development of A129 development with TAI
Westland Lynx	1971-03-21	present	5.33t	military helicopter

== See also ==
- List of Italian companies

Comparable major helicopter manufacturers:

- Airbus Helicopters
- Bell Helicopter
- Boeing Rotorcraft Systems
- MD Helicopters
- Russian Helicopters
- Sikorsky Aircraft
