= PZL SW-4 Puszczyk =

Polish light utility helicopter

SW-4 / AW009
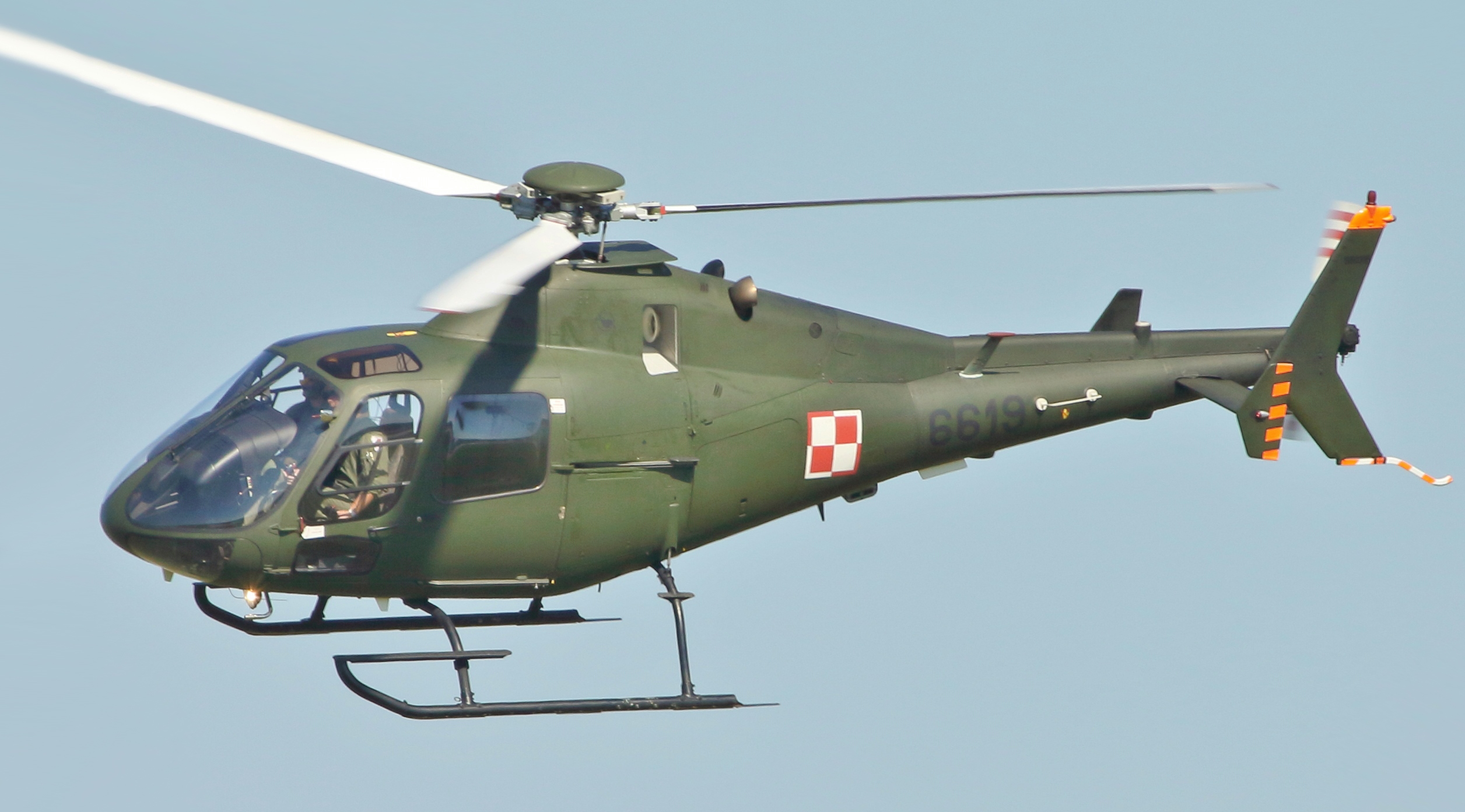
- SW-4 with the Polish Air Force

General information
- Type: Multipurpose utility helicopter
- National origin: Poland
- Manufacturer: PZL-Świdnik
- Status: In service
- Primary user: Polish Armed Forces
- Number built: 40

History
- Manufactured: 1996–present
- Introduction date: 2002
- First flight: 29 October 1996

The PZL SW-4 Puszczyk (en: tawny owl) is a Polish light single-engine multipurpose helicopter manufactured by PZL-Świdnik. Following a protracted development, the SW-4 entered service in 2002. The primary operator of the type has been the Polish Armed Forces. The SW-4 was further developed by PZL-Świdnik and corporate parent AgustaWestland into an optionally piloted vehicle, the SW-4 Solo. From 2016 onwards, the type has been marketed to civil operators as the AW009, while the SW-4 designation is used for the military market.

== Development ==
=== Origins ===
The design of the SW-4 helicopter originates from the 1960s, but it was decided not to manufacture the civil SW-4 at the time so as to meet demand for military helicopters from various nations within the Warsaw Pact. Around 1981, development work at PZL-Swidnik was started on a new four/five place light utility helicopter. The original design for the SW-4 called for it to be powered by a 300 kW (400 shp) PZL Rzeszow GTD350 turboshaft engine, as featured upon the prototype mockup. According to PZL-Swidnik, the early SW-4 could reach the rated top speed of about 240 km/h (130 kn) and a max range with auxiliary fuel tank about 900 km (485 nmi). Following the collapse of the Soviet Union and the subsequent European restructuring, predominantly those countries that had formerly been members of the Warsaw Pact, the emerging political climate had allowed PZL-Swidnik to redesign the SW-4 to make use of a new foreign-built powerplant, the Allison (now Rolls-Royce) Model 250 turboshaft engine, which was 13% more powerful while consuming 30% less fuel than the originally-intended GTD350 powerplant. Other changes were made to the design, which ultimately bore little resemblance to its earlier form. In 1995, the SW-4 project was formally re-launched and, in addition to the switch of power plant, the rotorcraft's design was substantially modified. Design alternations include the adoption of epoxy resin-based composite materials for the fuselage structure, further streamlining of the fuselage, and a revised tail and tail boom made primarily of aluminium.

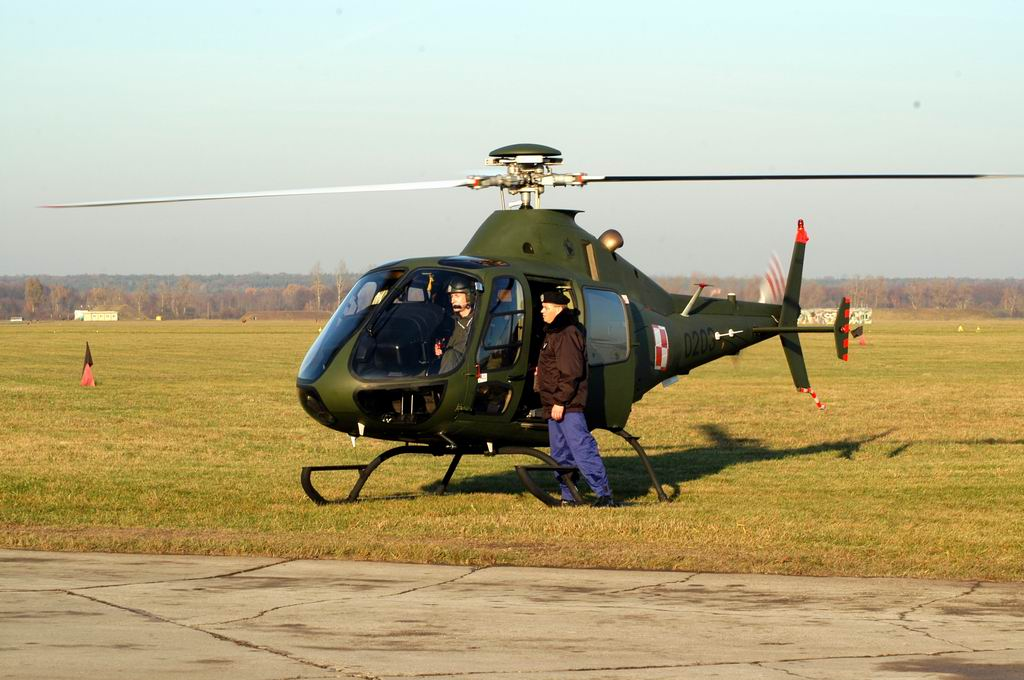
SW-4 idling prior to takeoff, 2006

In December 1994, the project had proceeded to ground testing of a non-flying prototype. Subsequently, a pair of flight-capable prototypes were assembled to support the development program. The first prototype was planned to perform an initial flight in January 1995, however this was delayed due to vibration issues during engine runs. On 26 October 1996, the SW-4 was reported as having performing its first flight; an official first flight was conducted on 29 October 1996. By May 2002, the two prototypes had accumulated a total of 640 flight hours. PZL-Swidnik targeted US Federal Aviation Administration (FAA) FAR Part 27 certification for the SW-4. it was believed that the program should be capable of producing production models by 1999.

A decision to redesign the main rotor head resulted in considerable delays to the flight testing program; during this time, other changes were made to the rotorcraft, included the horizontal stabilizer being extended and improvements of the hydraulic systems. In 2002, the first production model SW-4, which was equipped with the Rolls-Royce engine, was approaching receipt of certification from the Polish civil aviation authority. Certification for use in other markets is to be made upon customer request, targeting a $700,000 price at the time. On 1 October 2002, serial production of the SW-4 formally began. On 27 September 2007, type certification from the European Aviation Safety Agency (EASA) was received. Following on from the certification of the Rolls-Royce model, PZL Swidnik pursued a separate re-certification for a modified SW-4 fitted with a Pratt & Whitney Canada PW200 powerplant as an alternative option.

=== Further development ===
The SW-4 as planned was expected to fulfill a range of utility missions ranging from civil and executive transport to Medevac, police, border patrol duties, and some of military pilot training tasks; however, for several years the Polish military had served as the type's only customer. In Polish service, 24 SW-4, with a military name Puszczyk, has been used as a training rotorcraft, replacing the Mil Mi-2, at "The Center of Aviation Education and Training at Dęblin" (Ośrodek Szkolenia Lotniczego w Dęblinie).

In January 2004, Indonesian Aerospace (IAe) was in the process of negotiating a risk-sharing agreement to set up a local assembly line for the SW-4, dependent upon an order from the Indonesian National Police.

In October 2005, PZL-Świdnik revealed that it was conducting talks with Rolls-Royce over the prospective use of a more powerful variant of the SW-4's Model 250C20R powerplant; at the same point, it was publicly acknowledged that the development of a stretched, twin-engine development of the SW-4 was under active consideration, and that this would be dependent upon export sales of the present model. In February 2009, Rolls-Royce stated that it was holding talks with PZL-Świdnik on the prospective use of its newly developed Rolls-Royce RR500 engine on future derivatives of the SW-4.

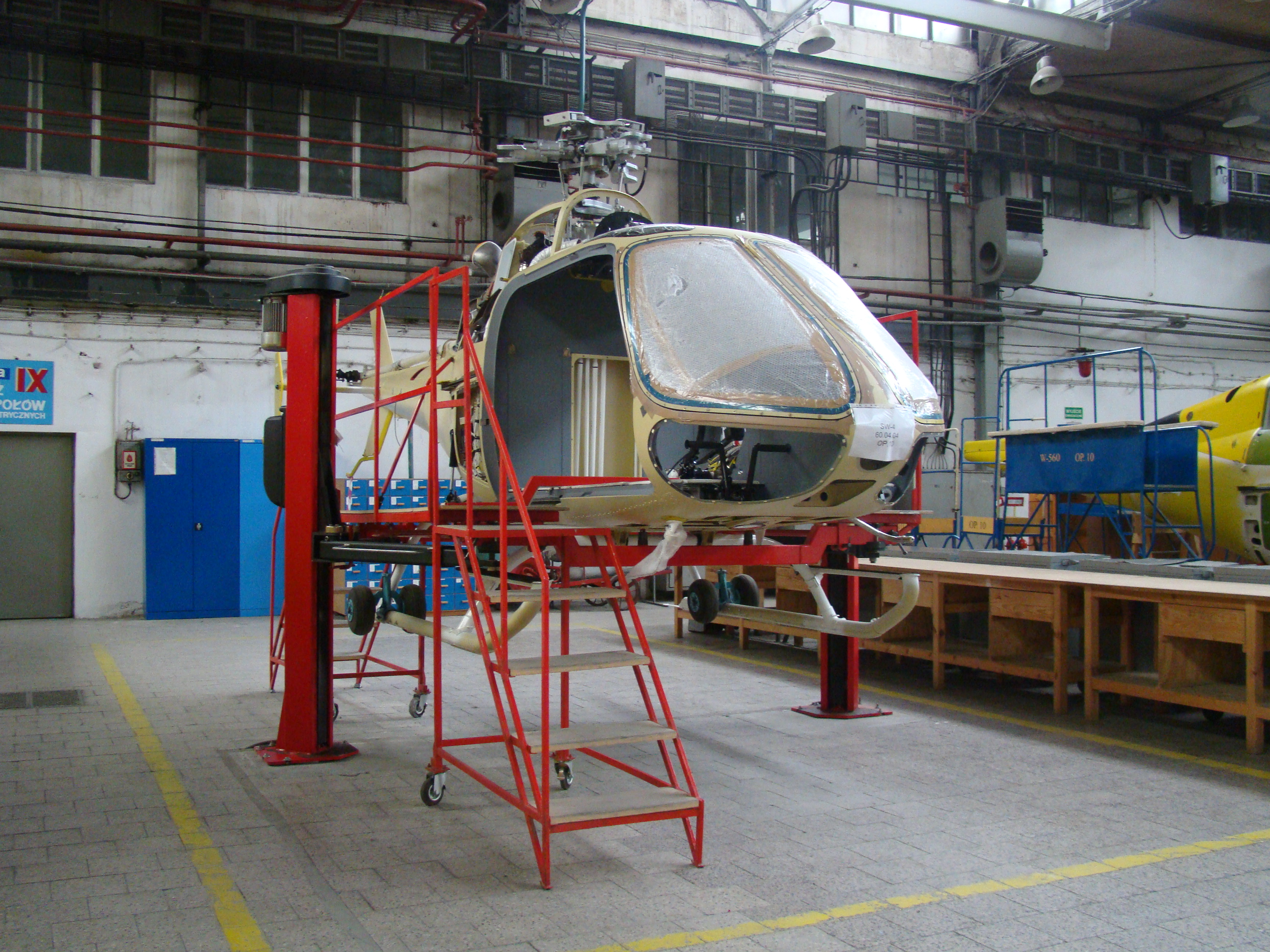
SW-4 under construction, 2011

PZL-Świdnik's parent company, AgustaWestland chose to use the SW-4 as the basis for an optionally manned rotorcraft, the PZL-Świdnik SW-4 Solo. In 2011, development of an optionally-manned demonstrator began. The SW-4 Solo was first was shown at the MSPO 2012 in Poland as "SW-4 Solo" RUAS/OPH platform (Rotorcraft Unmanned Air System/Optionally Piloted Helicopter). In 2013, AgustaWestland was given a Royal Navy contract for the SW-4 Solo's development as part of the UK's RWUAS (Rotary Wing Unmanned Air System) Capability Concept Demonstrator (CCD) programme. Development of the SW-4 Solo is also being supported by the Italian Ministry of Defence's Directorate for Air Armaments under the Italian National Military Research Plan. By September 2015, the SW-4 Solo had performed a total of 26 demonstration flights, which included simulated shipboard integration tests. In November 2015, AgustaWestland stated that the SW-4 Solo was "ready for sale".

In 2006, PZL-Świdnik entered into an agreement with China's Jiujiang Hongying Technology Development Ltd. which aimed for the establishment of an SW4 assembly line in Jiujiang, China. In December 2008, a type certification for the SW-4 was issued by the Civil Aviation Administration of China. In late February 2010, the maiden flight of the first SW-4 to be co-produced in China took place; in the same month, PZL Swidnik announced an agreement to produce 150 helicopters, an unspecified number of which being the SW-4, were to be produced for the Chinese market at Jiujiang. By March 2015, a total of five co-produced SW-4s had been delivered to Chinese customers.

In February 2016, an upgraded model of the SW-4 for the civil market, designated as the AW009, was revealed at Heli-Expo. Amongst the changes to this commercial variant include flight performance changes to provide for increased smoothness and greater control authority, the integration of a mass vibration absorber, the adoption of a Genesys Aerospace glass cockpit common to the larger AgustaWestland AW119 Koala, hydraulic improvements, and an optional upgraded Model 250-C30R engine.

== Design ==
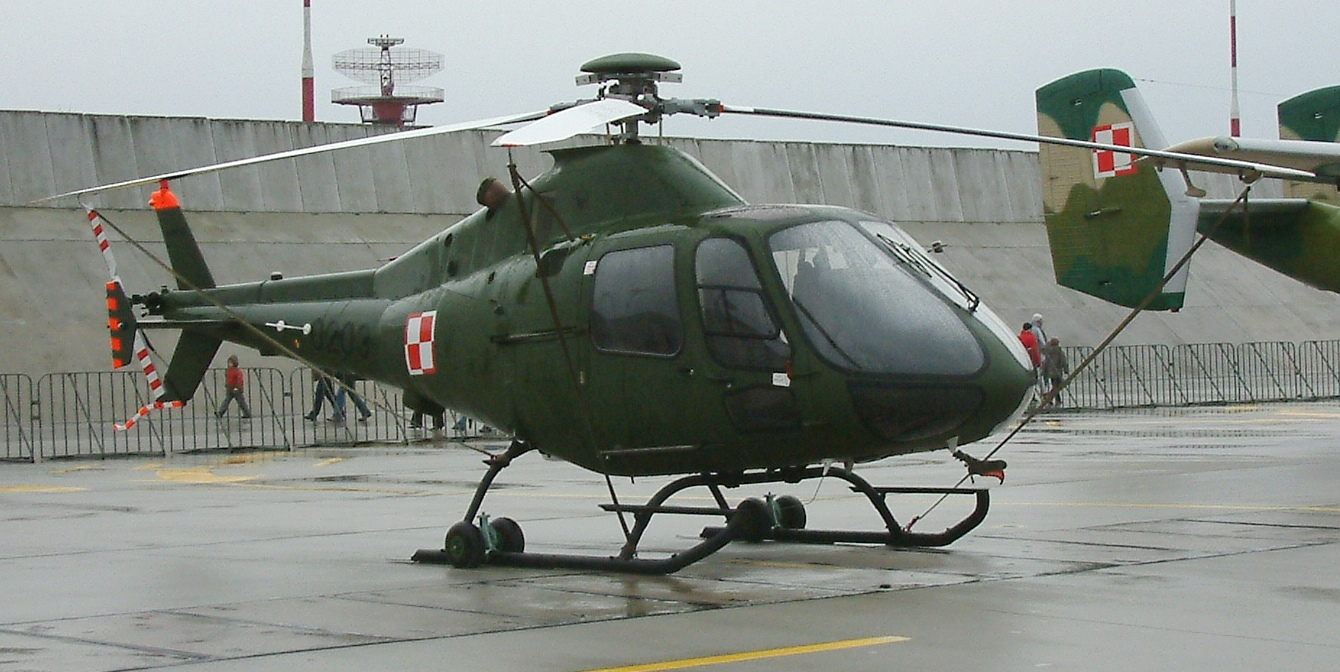
PZL SW-4 #0203 of Polish Air Force

The SW-4 is powered by a single 335 kW (450 shp) (283 kW/380 shp max continuous rated) Rolls-Royce Model 250C20R/2 turboshaft engine, which drives the rotorcraft's three-blade main rotor and two-blade tail rotor. An alternative engine is provided in the form of the 460 kW (615 shp) Pratt & Whitney Canada PW200/9 turboshaft engine. The main rotor is fully articulated and the rotor blades on both the main and tail rotors are composed of composite materials. The SW-4 uses hydraulic flight controls, the rotorcraft has been promoted as possessing excellent flight controls, and can be flown in both day and night visual flight rules conditions.

The SW-4 is capable of transporting up to five people, including a pilot, in crashworthy seats; passengers are provided with a high level of external visibility and comfort, an optional vibration absorption system is also offered. The main cabin can be rapidly reconfigured between passenger and cargo-carrying configurations and is accessed via two sliding doors on either side of the cabin, a dedicated baggage compartment is also present beneath the main cabin. PZL- Świdnik stated that multi-role operations had been a high priority during the SW-4's development; and that the rotorcraft is well-suited to passenger transport, primary and advanced training, patrol and surveillance missions.

Various optional equipment can be installed, such as removable co-pilot flight controls, wire strike protection system, a forward looking infrared (FLIR) sensor system, instrument flight rules (IFR) training fittings, radio altimeter, emergency medical system, moving map, external loudspeakers and/or search light, flotation gear, and an external cargo sling. Much of the external equipment is designed to be held on external extension arms; overall, the SW-4 can mount/carry a useful payload of up to nearly 600 kilograms. Both basic and advanced trainer variants of the SW-4 have been developed to conform with NATO standards and military pilot training regulations, it is promoted as possessing a high level of inherent flight stability and safety; the advanced model is compatible with night vision goggles (NVG) and is equipped with an emergency simulation unit.

== Operators ==
Military operators

Poland

- Polish Air Force

== Specifications (SW-4) ==
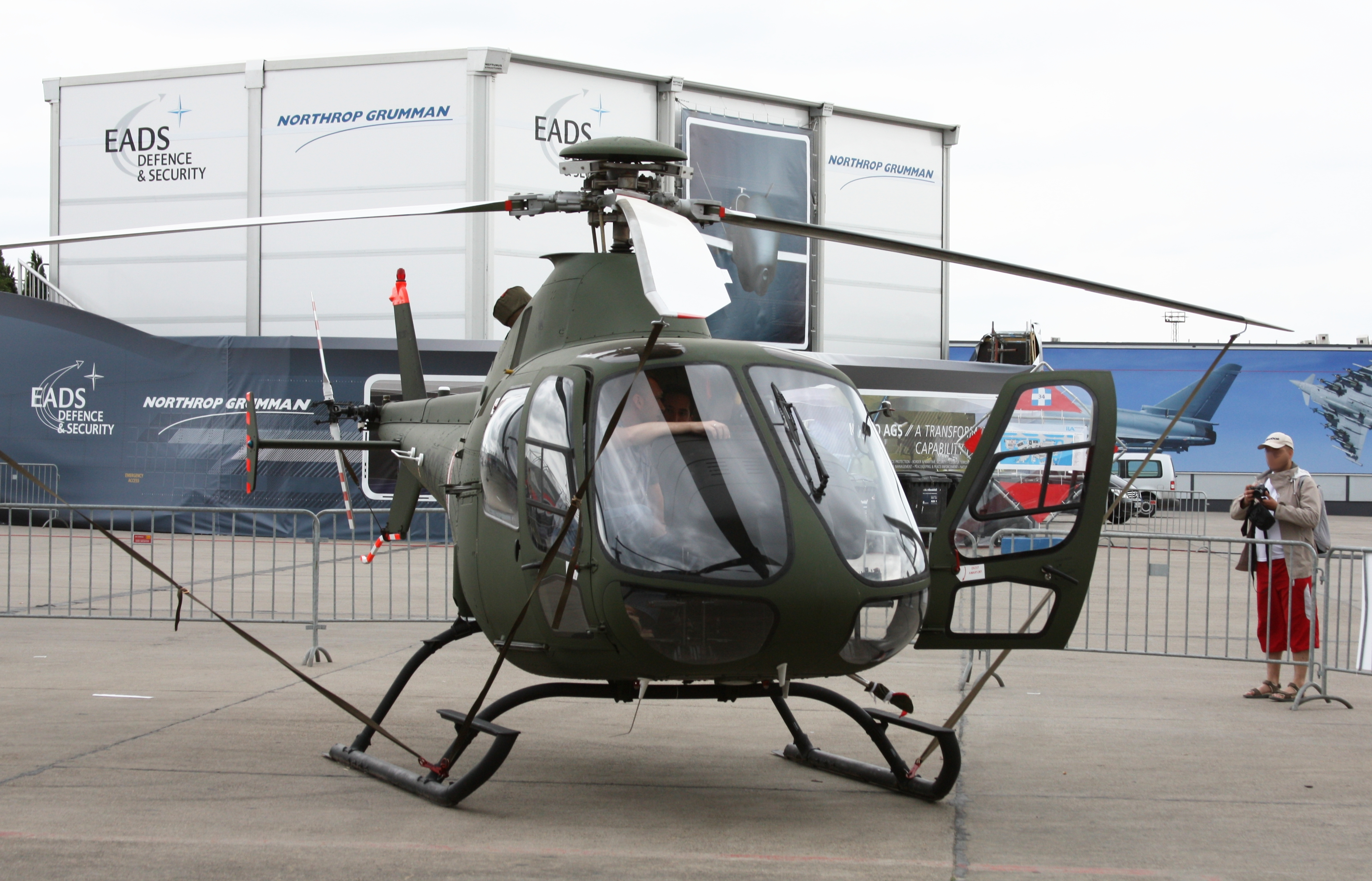
SW-4 on static display, 2010

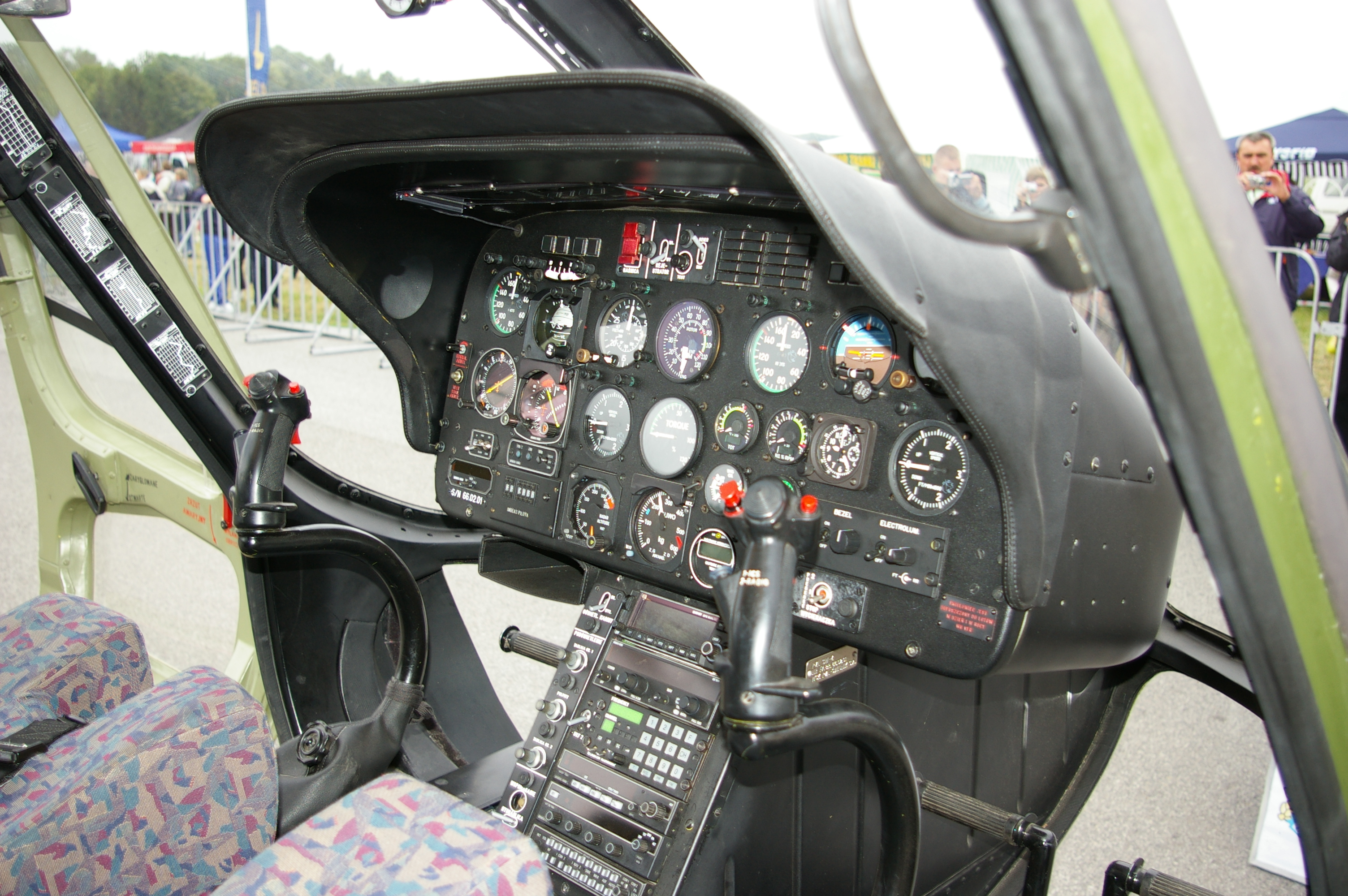
Flight controls of a SW-4, 2007

Data from AgustaWestland

General characteristics

- Crew: 1
- Capacity: 4 passengers
- Length: 10.57 m (34 ft 8 in)
- Height: 3.05 m (10 ft 0 in)
- Empty weight: 1,050 kg (2,315 lb)
- Gross weight: 1,600 kg (3,527 lb)
- Max takeoff weight: 1,800 kg (3,968 lb)
- Powerplant: 1 × Rolls-Royce 250-C20R/2 turboshaft engine, 336 kW (451 hp)
- Main rotor diameter: 9 m (29 ft 6 in)
- Main rotor area: 64 m^{2} (690 sq ft)

Performance

- Maximum speed: 260 km/h (160 mph, 140 kn)
- Range: 790 km (490 mi, 430 nmi)
- Service ceiling: 5,200 m (17,100 ft)
- Rate of climb: 10.3 m/s (2,030 ft/min)
- Disk loading: 25 kg/m^{2} (5.1 lb/sq ft)
- Power/mass: 0.21 kW/kg (0.13 hp/lb)

== See also ==
Aircraft of comparable role, configuration, and era

- Bell 505 Jet Ranger X
- Bell 206 – (United States, Canada)
- Cicaré CH-14 – (Argentina)
- Eurocopter EC120 Colibri – (France, China, Singapore)
- Schweizer 333 – (United States)
- MD Helicopters MD 500 – (United States)

Related lists

- List of rotorcraft
