= Latke, the Lucky Dog =

2014 holiday-themed children's picture book

- Author: Ellen Fischer
- Language: English
- Genre: Picture Book
- Publisher: Kar-Ben Publishing
- ISBN: 9780761390381

Latke, the Lucky Dog is a 2014 holiday-themed children's picture book written by Ellen Fischer and illustrated by Tiphanie Beeke. The story is about a mixed-breed dog, named Latke, who is adopted from an animal shelter for a Hanukkah present.

== About ==
Latke, the Lucky Dog is told from the perspective of a mixed-breed dog named Latke (named so, because he is the same color as a latke). Latke was adopted from an animal shelter as a present for Hanukkah for siblings Zoe and Zach. Latke assumes that the Hanukkah food and presents are for him. During the story, Latke makes mistakes and messes, but is forgiven each time and at the end, decides he is "one lucky dog to be part of a great family." The story also includes a page dedicated to describing Hanukkah customs and background.

== Reviews ==
Kirkus Review felt that Latke, the dog, was a "charismatic star" in an unoriginal story. The Jewish Book Council, however, felt that the story provided a "unique perspective on the holiday." The Horn Book Magazine called the illustrations by Tiphanie Beeke, "cheerful," and described the story as "an engaging romp." Publishers Weekly described Beeke's illustrations as "sprightly." School Library Journal wrote "This is a pleasant Hanukkah title, with the bonus of nicely conveying that the rescued animal is a lucky dog indeed." Library Media Connection recommended the title for libraries that need to "round out their holiday book choices."
