= PZL SM-4 Łątka =

SM-4 Łątka
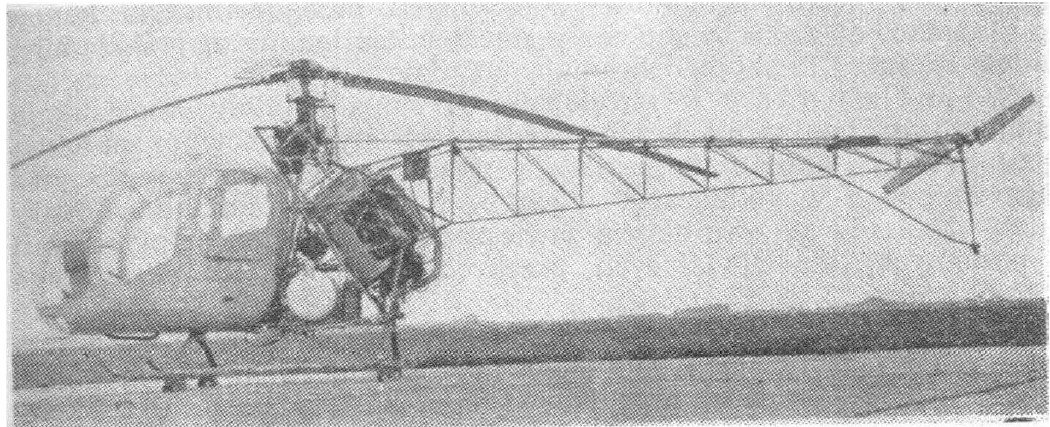

General information
- Type: Light utility helicopter
- National origin: Poland
- Manufacturer: WSK Świdnik
- Designer: Jerzy Kotlinski
- Status: Abandoned
- Number built: 1

History
- First flight: Not flown

The PZL SM-4 Łątka (Polish: Dragonfly) was a prototype three-seat helicopter of the 1960s, developed by WSK PZL-Świdnik in Poland. Of largely conventional design and construction, a single prototype was built, but was not flown as a result of engine problems.

== Design and development ==
In 1960, a design team led by Jerzy Kotliński at the Polish WSK PZL-Świdnik factory began work on a new short-range light helicopter, which was given the designation SM-4 Łątka. WSK PZL-Świdnik had previously license-built Soviet Mil Mi-1 helicopters, designated SM-1, starting in 1955. They had also designed and built the PZL SM-2 derivative of the Mi-1; the SM-4 was the first completely original aircraft design to be developed by them.

The Łątka was designed as a three-seat, single-engined helicopter of conventional layout. It was equipped with a single three-bladed glass-fibre main rotor and a two-bladed tail rotor, with power provided by a Narkiewicz WN-6S air-cooled flat-six horizontally-opposed piston engine, which was mounted behind the cabin. The pilot and two passengers were accommodated in an enclosed cabin with extensive glazing. The tail rotor was carried on the end of an open tail boom constructed of welded steel tube, giving a layout similar to that of a Bell 47. The undercarriage consisted of two skids.

A single prototype of the SM-4 was completed; the helicopter was used to carry out ground tests, but it never flew as the WN-06S engine failed to receive clearance for flight operations, and the program was abandoned.

== Specifications (performance estimated) ==
Data from Jane's All The World's Aircraft 1966–67

General characteristics

- Crew: 1
- Capacity: 2 passengers
- Empty weight: 660 kg (1,455 lb)
- Max takeoff weight: 1,000 kg (2,205 lb)
- Powerplant: 1 × Narkiewicz WN-6S air-cooled six-cylinder horizontally-opposed piston engine, 130 kW (180 hp)
- Main rotor diameter: 10.00 m (32 ft 10 in)
- Main rotor area: 78.5 m^{2} (845 sq ft)

Performance

- Maximum speed: 115 km/h (71 mph, 62 kn)
- Range: 300 km (190 mi, 160 nmi) with maximum fuel
- Service ceiling: 3,300 m (10,800 ft)
- Rate of climb: 4.4 m/s (870 ft/min)

== See also ==
Aircraft of comparable role, configuration, and era

- Aérospatiale Alouette II
- Bell 47J Ranger
- Hiller OH-23 Raven
- TH-55 Osage/Hughes 269
- Hughes/Schweizer 300
