= PZL-Świdnik =

Aircraft manufacturer in Poland

PZL-Świdnik S.A.
- Formerly: WSK-Świdnik; WSK "PZL-Świdnik"
- Industry: Aerospace
- Founded: 1951
- Headquarters: Świdnik, Lublin Voivodeship, Poland
- Key people: Jacek Libucha (Chairman)
- Parent: PZL (1951–1989); AgustaWestland (2010–2016); Leonardo S.p.A. (2016–Present)
- Website: pzl.swidnik.pl

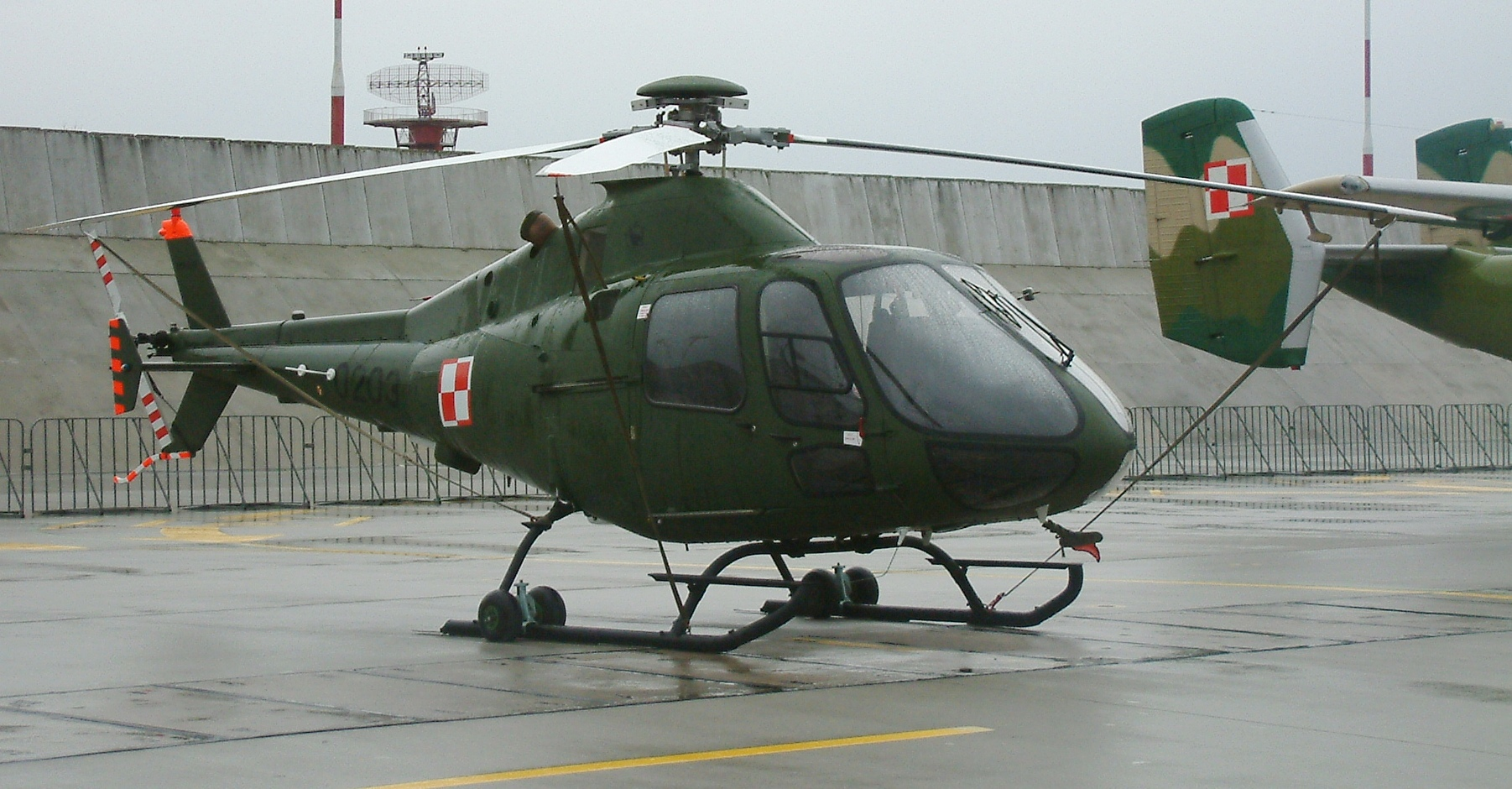
PZL SW-4 of Polish Air Force

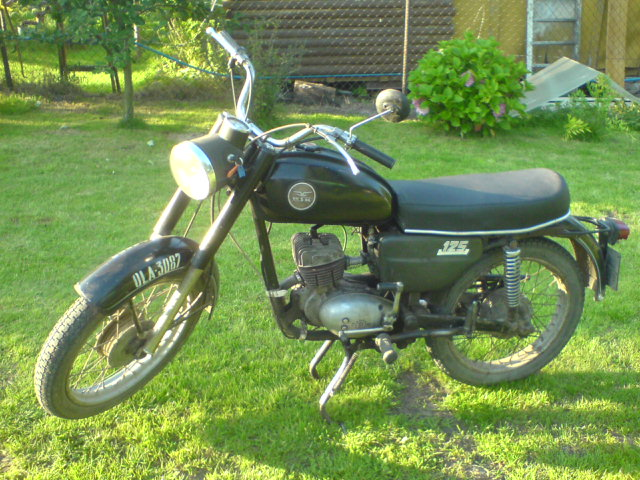
WSK M06B3 motorcycle

PZL-Świdnik S.A. (Wytwórnia Sprzętu Komunikacyjnego PZL-Świdnik S.A.) is the biggest helicopter manufacturer in Poland. Its main products are PZL W-3 Sokół and PZL SW-4 Puszczyk helicopters. In early 2010 the factory was acquired by AgustaWestland, today Leonardo.

== History ==
History of plant establishment dating back to 1920, when in Lublin opened the first aircraft factory "Plage i Laśkiewicz". After World War II, part of the senior instructors staff incorporated into the newly formed "Wytwórnia Sprzętu Komunikacyjnego". In 1951 a third national aerospace factory, WSK-Świdnik, was built in Świdnik, and in 1957 it was renamed to WSK PZL-Świdnik. Since 1956 it has become one of the world's major helicopter manufacturers, producing helicopters under the Soviet licence, starting with the SM-1 (Mil Mi-1). Świdnik was the main producer of the Mi-1 and exclusive producer of the widely used in the world Mil Mi-2. Since the late 1980s, Świdnik has been producing a Polish-designed medium helicopter PZL W-3 Sokół. It also produces a light helicopter, the PZL SW-4 Puszczyk. After 1991 the state factory became a state-owned corporation (WSK "PZL-Świdnik" SA). It also produced the Pirat, PW-5 and PW-6 gliders and cooperates widely with other nations' manufacturers, e.g., in the manufacture of Agusta A109 fuselages.

In early 2010 the factory was acquired by AgustaWestland, today Leonardo.

=== Motorcycles ===
From 1954 until 1980 the WSK PZL-Świdnik was also a manufacturer of motorcycles, branded as the WSK. Some 2,000,000 motorcycles of the WSK M06 125 cc and WSK M21 175 cc families were made in that period.

== Aircraft ==
Model name	First flight	Number built	Type
PZL SM-1	1956	1,594	License built single piston engine utility helicopter
PZL SM-2	1959	89	Single piston engine utility helicopter
PZL Mi-2	1965	5,400+	License built two turboshaft engine utility helicopter
PZL SM-4 Łątka	N/A	1	Single piston engine utility helicopter
PZL Kania	1979	19	Two turboshaft engine utility helicopter
PZL W-3 Sokół	1979	149	Two turboshaft engine utility helicopter
PZL SW-4 Puszczyk	1996	40	Single turboshaft engine utility helicopter
PZL PW-5	1993	≈200	Glider
PZL PW-6	1998	≈35	Glider
PZL I-23 Manager	1999	2	Single piston engine monoplane sport airplane
PZL-Świdnik AW149	2025	1	Two turboshaft engine utility helicopter

== See also ==
- PZL
