= Mil Mi-2 =

Utility helicopter family by Mil

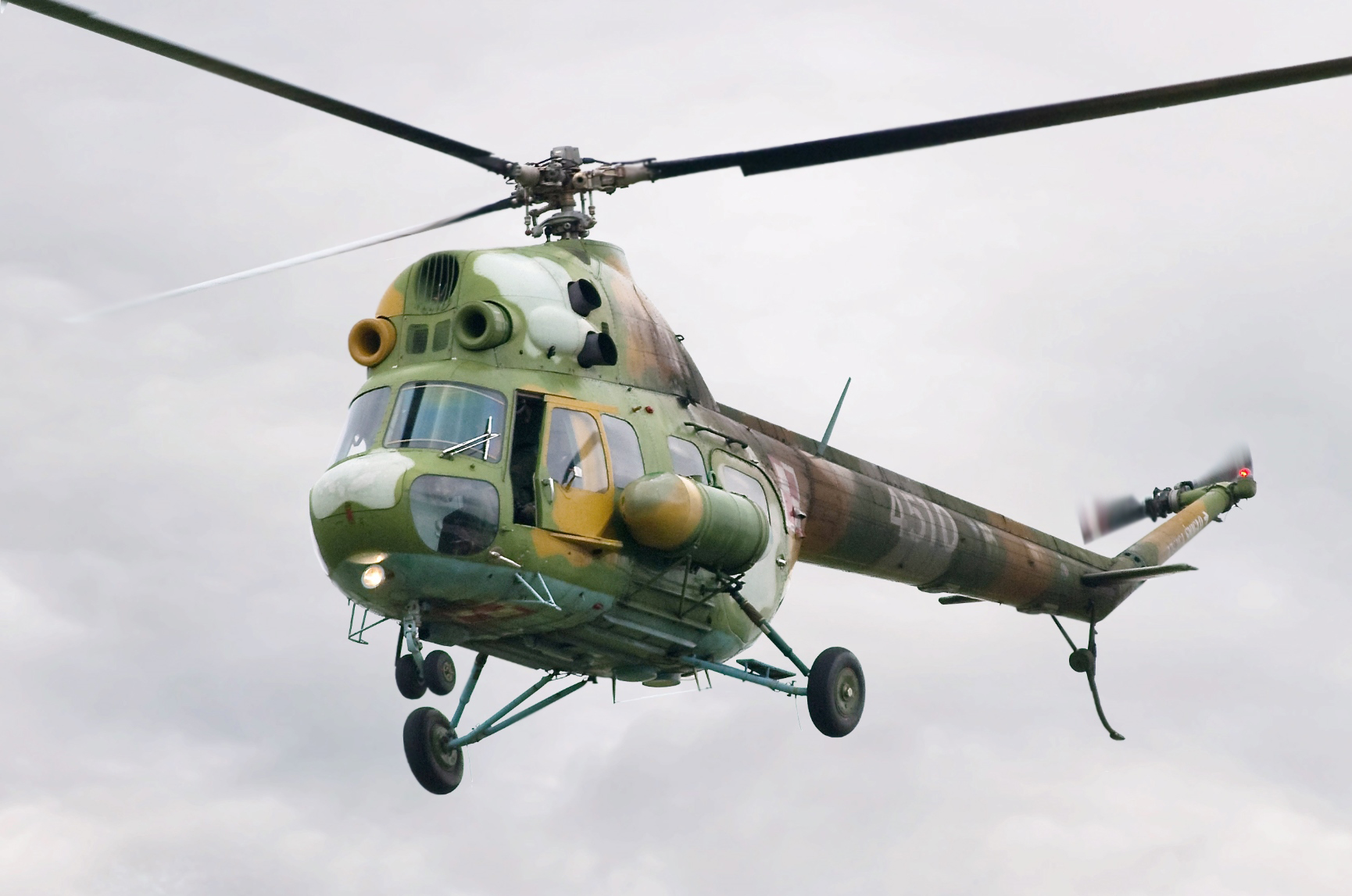
- Mi-2 of the Polish Air Force

General information
- Type: Utility helicopter
- Designer: Mil Moscow Helicopter Plant
- Built by: PZL-Świdnik
- Status: In service
- Primary users: Soviet Air Force (historical) Polish Armed Forces; Aeroflot (historical)
- Number built: 5,497

History
- Manufactured: 1964–1998
- Introduction date: 1965
- First flight: 22 September 1961
- Developed from: Mil Mi-1
- Variant: PZL Kania

The Mil Mi-2 (NATO reporting name: Hoplite) is a small, three rotor blade Soviet-designed multi-purpose helicopter developed by the Mil Moscow Helicopter Plant, designed in the early 1960s and produced exclusively by WSK "PZL-Świdnik" in Poland. Nearly 5,500 were made by the time production stopped in 1999, and it remains in service globally.

== Design and development ==
The Mi-2 was produced exclusively in Poland, in the WSK PZL-Świdnik factory in Świdnik.

The first production helicopter in the Soviet Union was the Mil Mi-1, modelled along the lines of the S-51 and Bristol Sycamore and flown by Mikhail Mil's bureau in September 1948. During the 1950s it became evident, and confirmed by American and French development, that helicopters could be greatly improved with turbine engines. S. P. Isotov developed the GTD-350 engine and Mil used two of these in the far superior Mi-2.

The twin shaft-turbine engines used in the Mi-2 develop 40% more power than the Mi-1's piston engines, for barely half the engine weight, with the result that the payload was more than doubled. The Mi-2 fuselage was extensively altered from its predecessor, with the engines mounted overhead. However, the external dimensions remained similar.

The Mil-built prototype first flew in the Soviet Union on 22 September 1961, after which the final development and the production of the project was transferred to Poland in 1964. The first Świdnik-built example flew on 4 November 1965; this was the only Soviet-designed helicopter to be built solely outside the Soviet Union. PZL-Świdnik produced a total of 5,497 helicopters, about a third for military users. The factory also developed fiberglass rotor blades, and developed the wide-body Mi-2M seating 10 passengers instead of eight. Most typical role-change kits include four stretchers for air ambulance usage, or aerospraying or cropdusting applications.

In Poland, several specialized military variants were also developed in early 1970s for support or training roles, with 23 mm autocannon, machine guns and/or two 57 mm rocket pods, four 9K11 Malyutka anti-tank missiles or Strela-2 AA missiles.

== Operational history ==
The Mi-2 was first introduced into the Soviet Air Force in 1965. The Mi-2 is used by mainly former Soviet and Eastern Bloc countries, although it was also purchased by the armed forces of Mexico and Myanmar.

Most of the armed Mi-2 variants were used by Poland. Some were also used by the former East Germany (with 7.62 mm machine gun and 57 mm unguided rocket armament only).

North Korea still maintains a large active fleet of Mi-2s.

During the 2022 Russian invasion of Ukraine, Russian forces were recorded capturing three Mi-2 helicopters in Kherson International Airport.

The helicopter is also used to spray agricultural chemicals by private owners in Ukraine. Two people were killed in a crash in 2021 near Zaive, in the region of Mykolaiv. Another two people died in a crash of Kharkiv Air Force University (203rd Training Aviation Brigade) Mi-2 crash in September 2024.

On 26 October 2024, a medical Mi-2 helicopter crashed in Kirov region in Russia, killing all four aboard, including a pilot, a doctor, and two paramedics.

As of 8 March 2025, Ukraine has lost six Mi-2 helicopters, including three which were captured by Russian forces.

== Variants ==
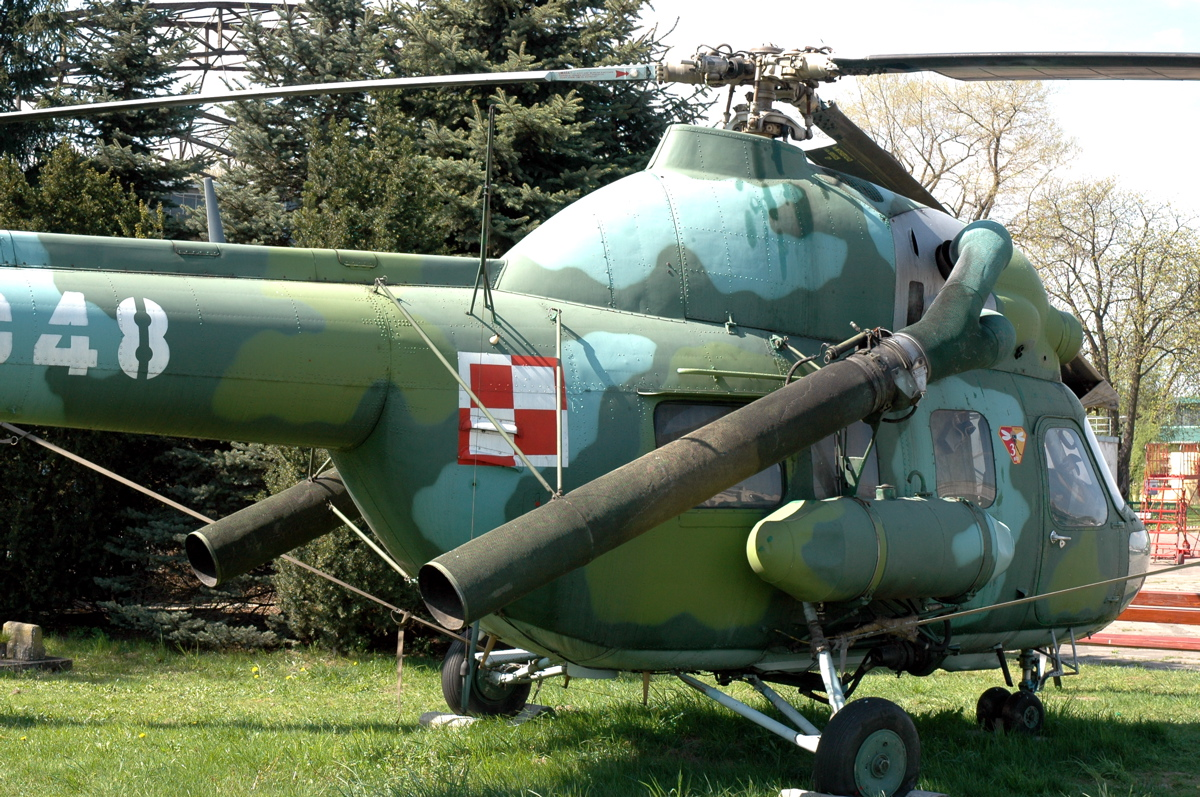
Mi-2Ch exhibited in Polish Aviation Museum

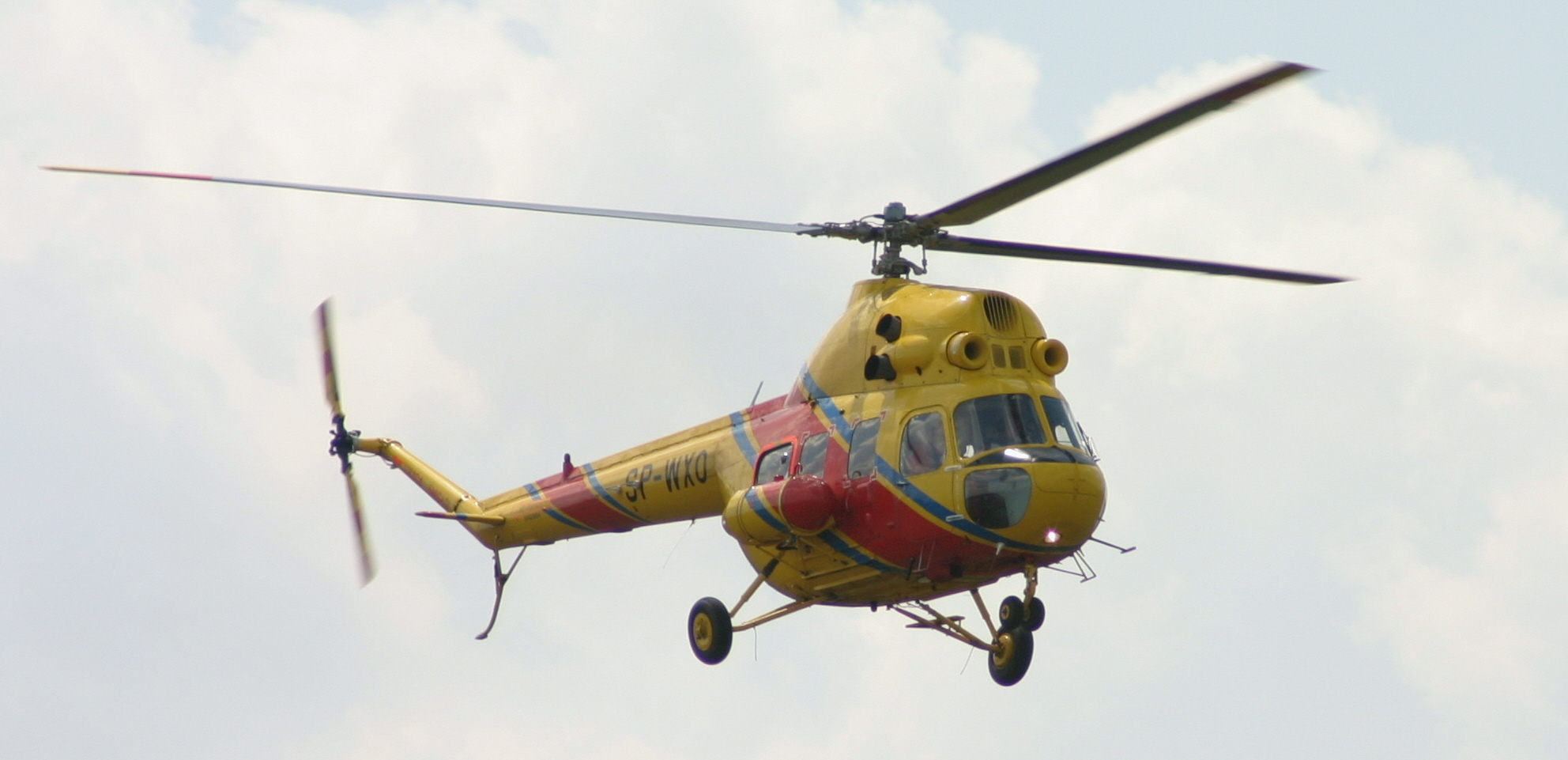
Mi-2 Plus air ambulance in Poland

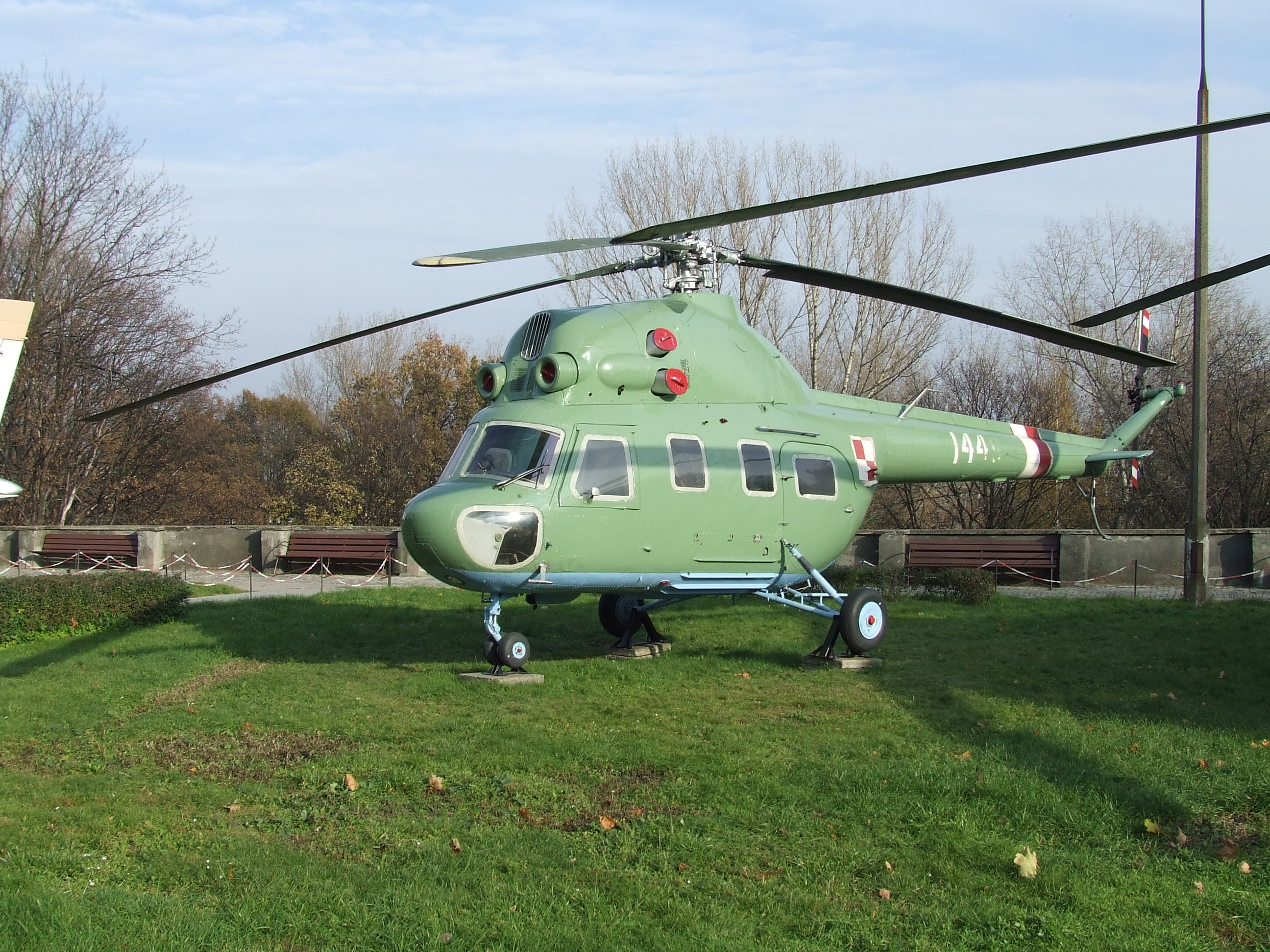
Mi-2P exhibited in Polish Army Museum in Warsaw.

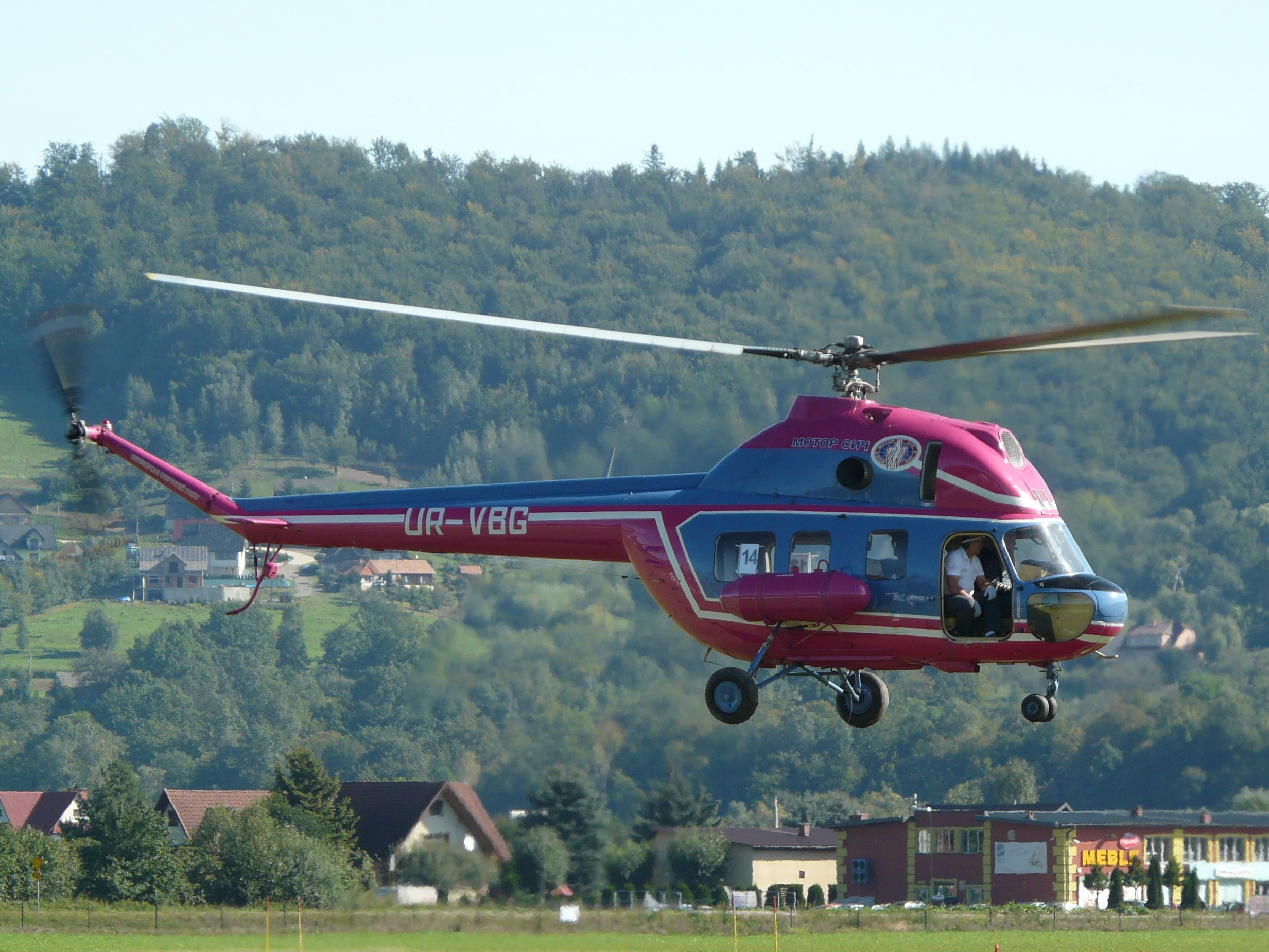
Mi-2MSB, Helicopter World Cup in Poland 2019

Mi-2 Platan
Aerial minelayer version with 20 tube launchers on external pods and in left cab door, each for six or nine mines. 18 converted for Polish Army starting from 1989.
Mi-2US
Armed version fitted with a fixed 23mm NS-23 cannon, 4 × 7.62mm PKT machine gun pods and optional cabin PK machine gun. 30 built for the Polish Army in 1972-73. Similar without a cannon built for East Germany.
Mi-2URN Żmija ('Viper')
Armed variant with a fixed 23mm NS-23 gun and two 16×57mm S-5 unguided rocket pods Mars-2. Optional 7,62mm PK machine gun window-mounted. 7 built for Polish Army in 1973 and 18 rebuilt from Mi-2US. Similar without a cannon built for East Germany.
Mi-2URP Salamandra ('Salamander')
Anti-tank variant, armed with 23mm NS-23 gun, optional window-mounted 7.62mm PK machine gun, and 4 × AT-3 Sagger (9M14M Malutka) wire-guided missiles on external weapons racks and 4 × additional missiles in the cargo compartment. Two rebuilt and 44 built for Polish Army in 1975-84.
Mi-2URP-G Gniewosz ('Smooth snake')
Mi-2URP with additional 4 × AA missiles Strzała-2 (Strela 2) in two Gad rocket launchers. Six rebuilt in 1988.
Mi-2MSB or MSB-2 Nadia ('Hope')
Modernized by Motor Sich to passenger-transport version for the civil aviation.
Mi-2MSB-V or MSB-2MO
Modernized by Motor Sich for Ukrainian Air Force. Original engine replaced with AI-450M 465 hp (347 kW) engine, armed with rocket and machine gun pods, IR-jamming system and flares dispenser for defence against MANPADS.

== Operators ==
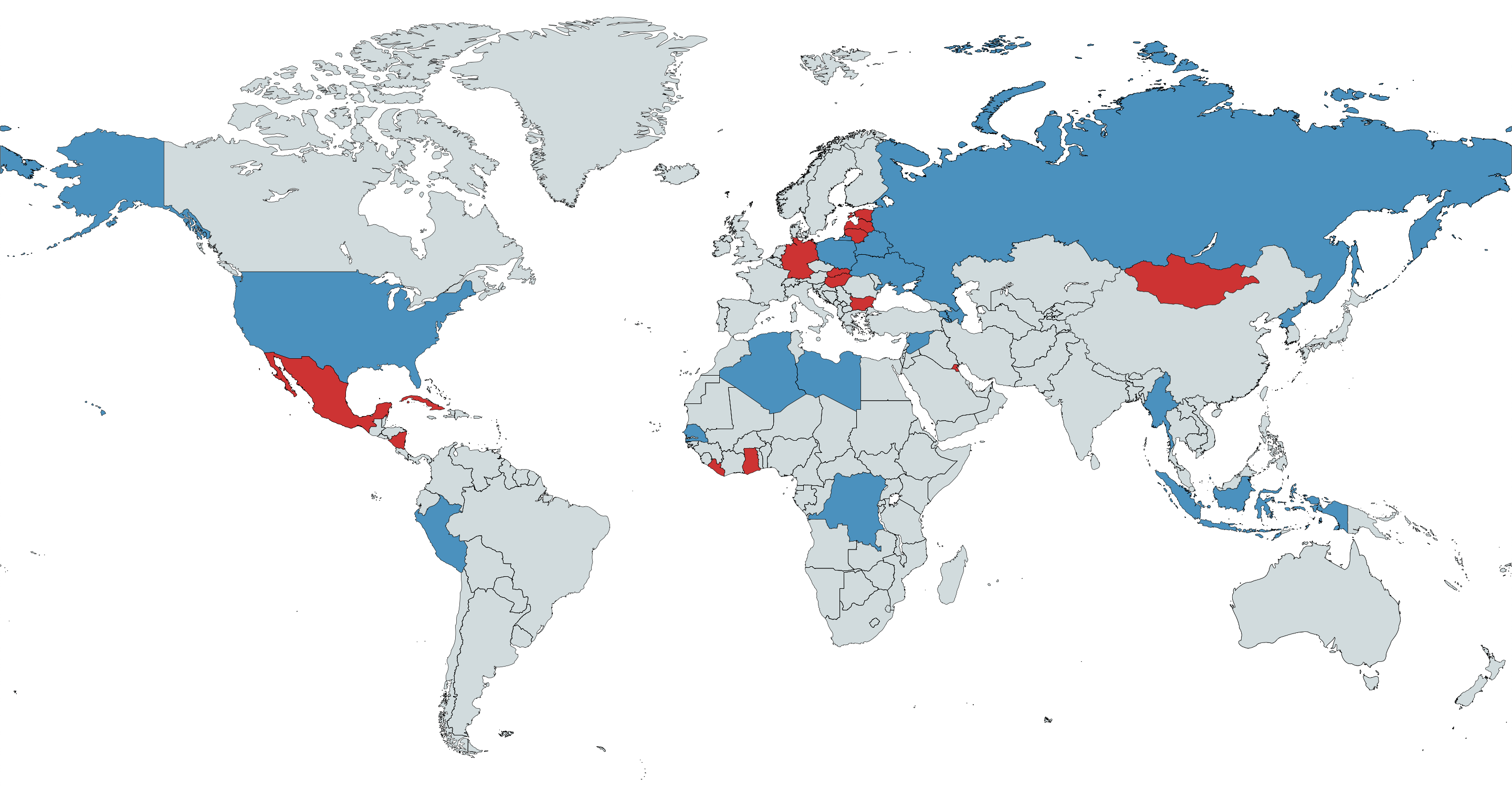
Map with Mi-2 users in blue

Algeria

- Algerian Air Force

Armenia

- Armenian Air Force

Azerbaijan

- Azerbaijani Air Force

Belarus

- Belarusian Air Force

Democratic Republic of the Congo

- Air Force of the Democratic Republic of the Congo

Indonesia

- Indonesian Navy
- Indonesian Police

Libya

- Libyan Air Force

Myanmar

- Myanmar Air Force

North Korea

- North Korean Air Force

Peru

- Peruvian Army

South Korea

- Total six, all in civilian companies. The Sky company (former Star Aerospace and also former Star Airline) has four; one borrowed, three bought. The companies Pearl Korea and Heliworld have one each.

Russia

- Russian Aerospace Forces

Senegal

- Senegal Air Force

Transnistria

- Armed Forces of Transnistria

Ukraine

- Ukrainian Army
  - Ukrainian Army Aviation
- National Guard of Ukraine
- Ukrainian Naval Aviation
  - 10th Naval Aviation Brigade
- Ukrainian Air Guard

United States

- United States Army
- University of Iowa

=== Former operators ===
Bulgaria

- Bulgarian Air Force

Cuba

- Cuban Air Force

Czechoslovakia

- Czech Air Force

Djibouti

- Djiboutian Air Force

Estonia

- Estonian Air Force

East Germany

- East German Air Force (48 Mi-2 in 1972-1990, including Grenztruppen)
- Grenztruppen

Germany

- German Air Force (25 in 1991-1995)
- German State Police

Ghana

- Ghana Air Force

Hungary

- Hungarian Air Force
- Hungarian Police

Latvia

- Latvian Air Force

Lithuania

- Lithuanian Air Force

Liberia

- Justice Air Wing

Mexico

- Mexican Navy

Mongolia

- Mongolian Air Force

Nicaragua

- Nicaraguan Air Force

Poland

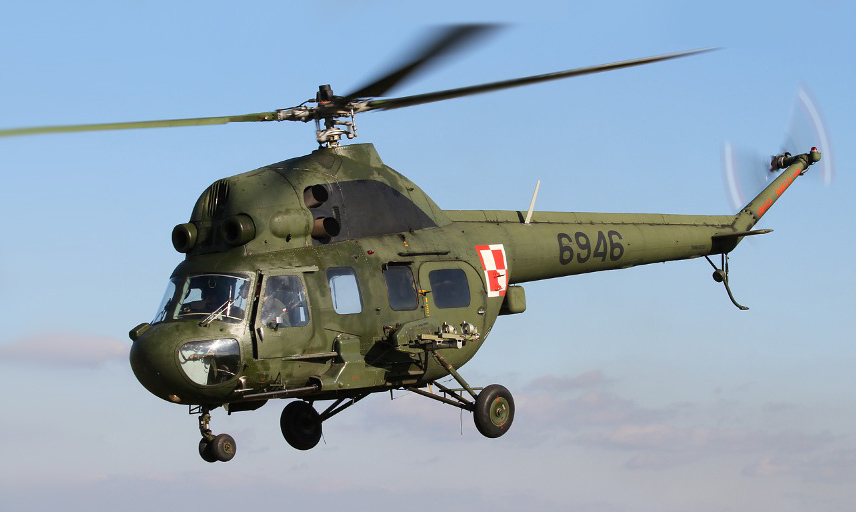
A Polish Mi-2 on takeoff

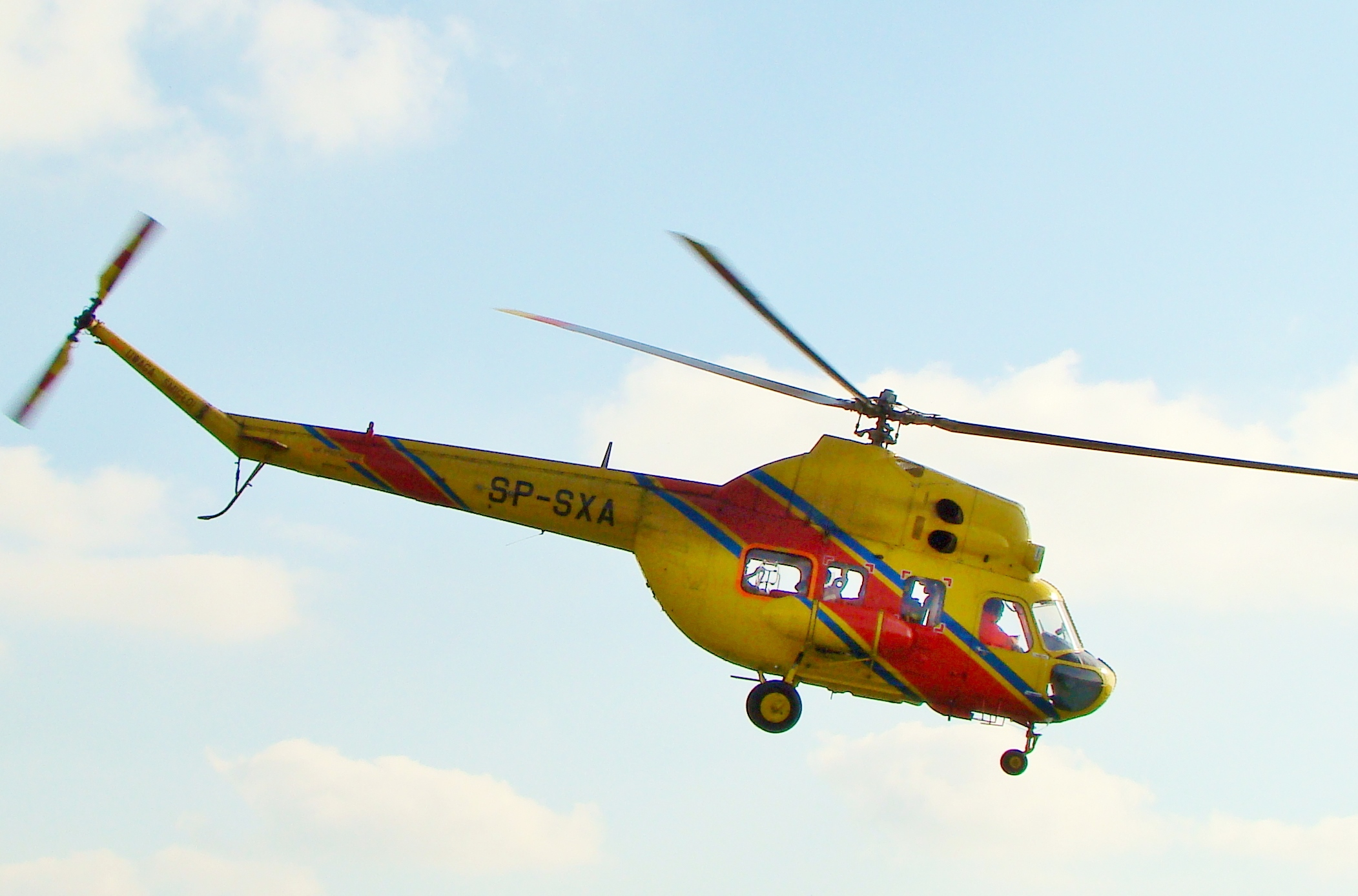
A Mi-2 of the Polish Medical Air Rescue

- Polish Air Force
- Polish Army
- Polish Border Guard
- Polish Navy

Russia

- Russian Army

Slovakia

- Slovak Air Force

Soviet Union

- Aeroflot
- Soviet Air Force
- Soviet Army Aviation
- Militsiya

Syria

- Syrian Arab Air Force The Syrian government of Al-Assad fell to rebels in late 2024, and the Syrian Arab Air Force was dismantled. It was re-established as Syrian Air Force, but the revolution, and the Israeli air strikes that followed it, wreaked havoc on the inventory of the Air Force. In late 2025, the World Air Forces publication by FlightGlobal, which tracks the aircraft inventories of world's air forces and publishes its counts annually, removed all Syrian Air Force's aircraft from their World Air Forces 2026 report. It is thus questionable if the Syrian Air Force has any flying aircraft in their inventory, and in particular, any Mil Mi-2, as of December 2025.

Ukraine

- Ukrainian Air Force

Yugoslavia

- Yugoslav People's Army

== Specifications (Mi-2T) ==
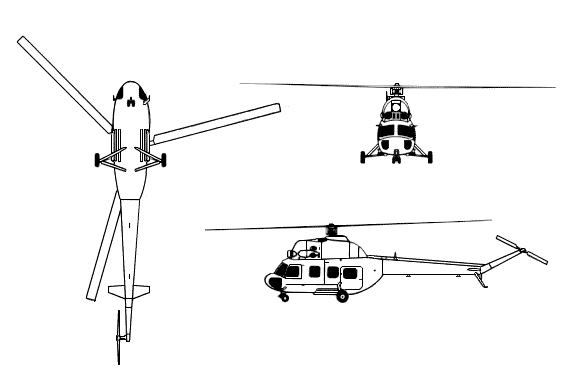
3-view line drawing of the Mil Mi-2

Data from Jane's All The World's Aircraft 1982–83

General characteristics

- Crew: One
- Capacity: 8 passengers / 700 kg (1,543 lb) internal cargo / 800 kg (1,764 lb) external cargo
- Length: 11.4 m (37 ft 5 in)
- Height: 3.75 m (12 ft 4 in)
- Empty weight: 2,372 kg (5,229 lb)
- Gross weight: 3,550 kg (7,826 lb)
- Max takeoff weight: 3,700 kg (8,157 lb)
- Powerplant: 2 × PZL GTD-350P turboshaft engines, 300 kW (400 shp) each
- Main rotor diameter: 14.5 m (47 ft 7 in)
- Main rotor area: 165.15 m^{2} (1,777.7 sq ft)
- Blade section: NACA 23012M

Performance

- Maximum speed: 200 km/h (120 mph, 110 kn)
- Range: 440 km (270 mi, 240 nmi) (max internal fuel, no reserves)
- Service ceiling: 4,000 m (13,000 ft)
- Rate of climb: 4.5 m/s (890 ft/min)
- Disk loading: 22.41 kg/m^{2} (4.59 lb/sq ft)
- Power/mass: 0.0806 kW/kg (0.0490 hp/lb)

== See also ==
Related development

- PZL Kania

Aircraft of comparable role, configuration, and era

- Bell 204/205

Related lists

- List of most-produced rotorcraft
