= MD Helicopters MH-6 Little Bird =

Attack helicopter used in United States special operations

MH-6/AH-6 Little Bird
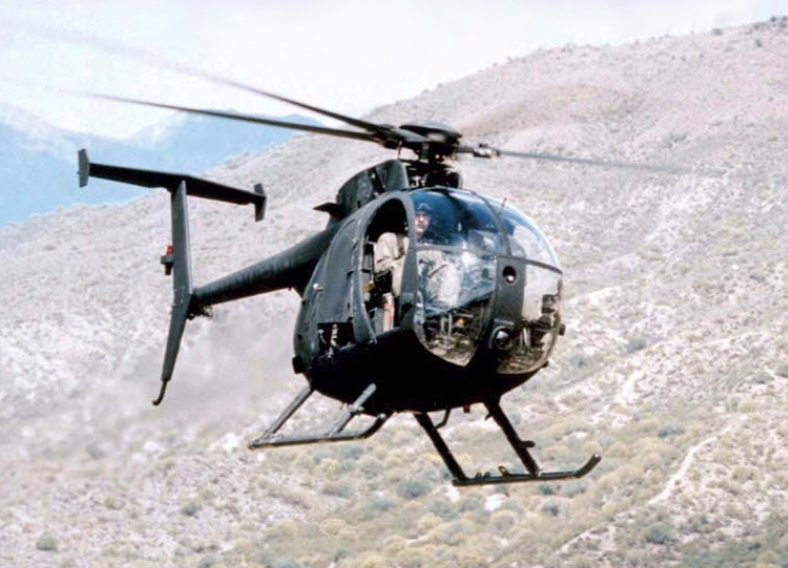
- An MH-6 Little Bird

General information
- Type: Observation; Multi-mission; Light attack
- National origin: United States
- Manufacturer: Hughes Helicopters; McDonnell Douglas Helicopter Systems; MD Helicopters
- Status: In service
- Primary user: United States Army

History
- Introduction date: 1980
- First flight: 27 February 1963
- Developed from: Hughes OH-6 Cayuse
- Variant: Boeing AH-6

The Boeing MH-6M Little Bird (nicknamed the Killer Egg) and its attack variant, the AH-6, are light helicopters used for special operations in the United States Army. Originally based on a modified OH-6A, it was later based on the MD 500E, with a single five-bladed main rotor. The newest version, the MH-6M, is based on the MD 530F and has a single, six-bladed main rotor and four-bladed tail rotor.

== Development ==
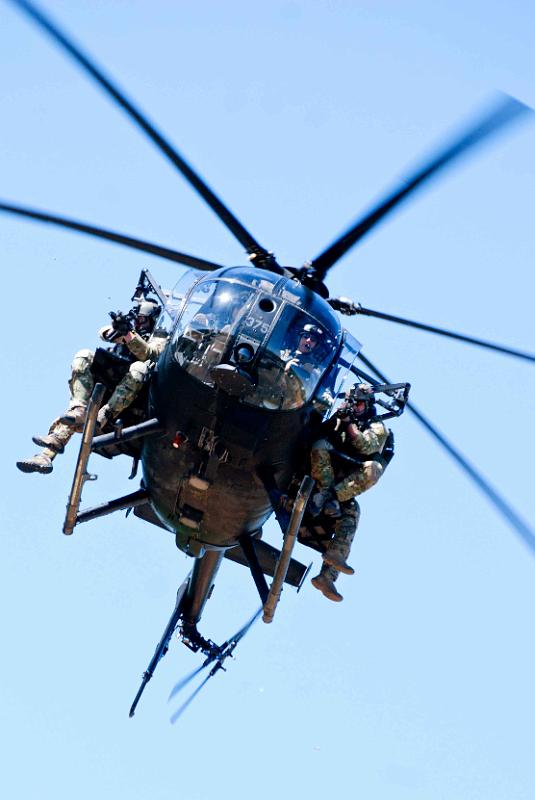
US Army Rangers on exercise using an MH-6

The OH-6 was started in 1960, when the US Army issued Technical Specification 153 for a Light Observation Helicopter (LOH) that could perform personnel transport, escort and attack missions, casualty evacuation, and observation. Twelve companies took part in the competition and Hughes Tool Company's Aircraft Division submitted the Model 369. Two designs, those submitted by Fairchild-Hiller and Bell, were selected as finalists by the Army-Navy design competition board, but the Army later included the helicopter from Hughes as well.

The first Model 369 prototype flew on 27 February 1963. Originally designated the YHO-6A under the army's designation system, the aircraft was redesignated the YOH-6A under the Department of Defense's new joint system in 1962. Five prototypes were built, each fitted with a 252 shp (188 kW) Allison T63-A-5A engine, and delivered to the US Army at Fort Rucker, Alabama to compete against the other 10 prototype aircraft submitted by Bell and Fairchild-Hiller. In the end, Hughes won the competition and the Army awarded a contract for production in May 1965. The initial order was for 714 aircraft. That was later increased to 1,300, with an option to buy another 114. Seventy helicopters were built in the first month.

This agile, unarmed helicopter is outfitted with outboard "benches" designed to ferry up to three operators on each side. There is a gunship variant, the AH-6, painted black for nighttime operations. This small aircraft can conduct rapid insertions and extractions of special operations forces into areas its larger counterpart, the MH-60 Black Hawk, cannot.

== Operational history ==
After the April 1980 failure of Operation Eagle Claw, in which Marine pilots and Navy helicopters were used, it was determined that the US Army lacked aircraft and crews who were trained and prepared to perform special operations missions. To remedy this shortcoming, the Army began developing a special aviation task force to prepare for the next attempt to rescue the hostages, Operation Credible Sport.

=== Task Force 160 ===
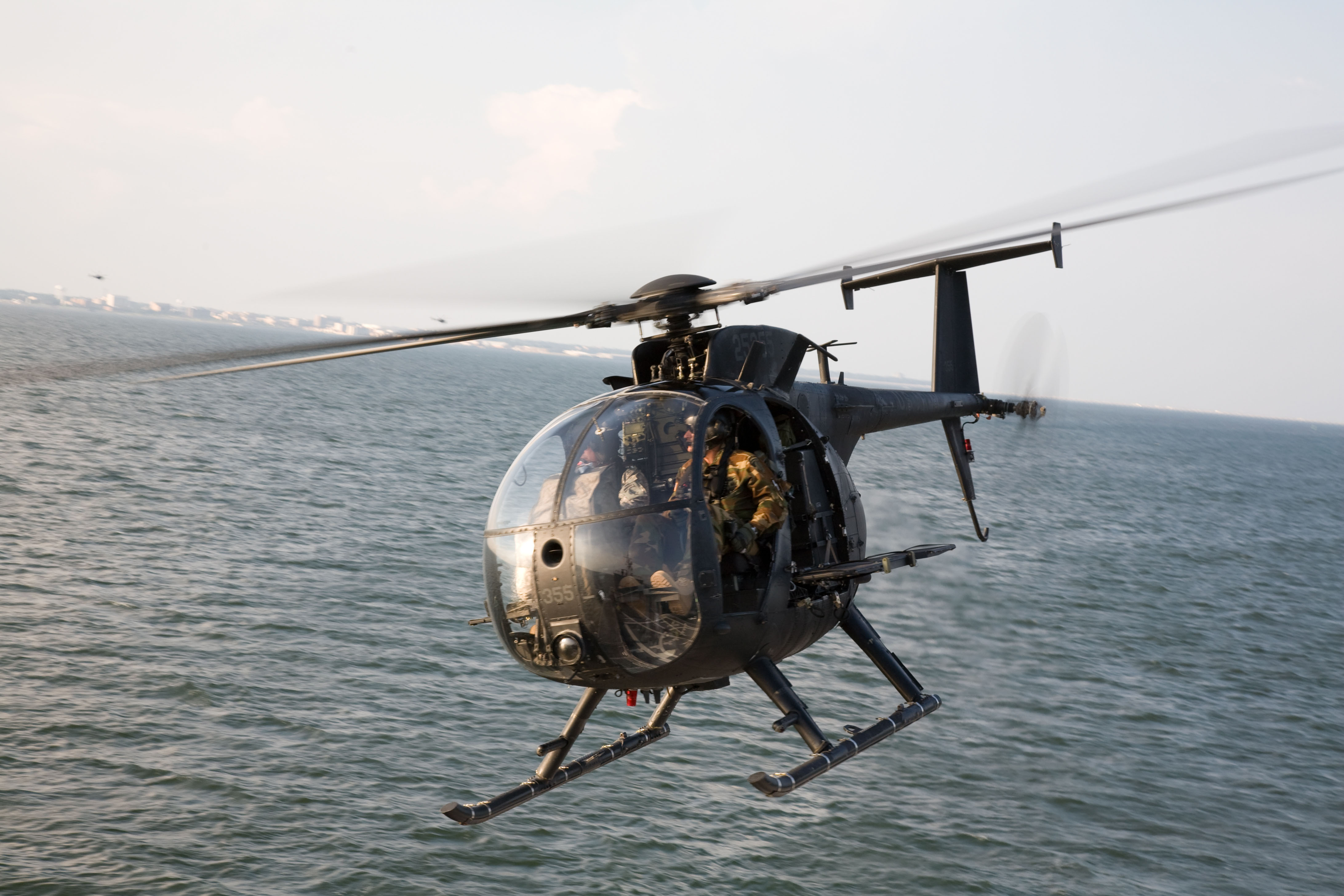
A MH-6 of the 160th Special Operations Aviation Regiment

The United States Army 160th Special Operations Aviation Regiment (Airborne), also known as Night Stalkers, is a special operations force that provides helicopter aviation support for general purpose forces and special operations forces. Its missions have included attack, assault, and reconnaissance, and are usually conducted at night, at high speeds, low altitudes, and on short notice.

The architects of the task force identified the need for a small helicopter that could land in the most restrictive locations and could be easily transported on Air Force airlifters. They chose the OH-6A scout helicopter, and it became known as the Little Bird compared to the other aircraft in the task force, the UH-60A and the CH-47C. As a separate part of the project, armed OH-6As were being developed at Fort Rucker, Alabama.

The pilots selected to fly the OH-6A helicopters came from the 229th Attack Helicopter Battalion and were sent to the Mississippi Army National Guard's Army Aviation Support Facility (AASF) at Gulfport, Mississippi, for two weeks of qualification training in the aircraft. When the training was completed, C-141 aircraft transported the aircraft and crews to Fort Huachuca, Arizona, for two weeks of mission training. The mission training consisted of loading onto C-130 transport aircraft which would then transport them to forward staging areas over routes as long as 1,000 nautical miles (1,900 km). The armed OH-6 aircraft from Fort Rucker joined the training program in the fall of 1980.

=== Operation Credible Sport ===
Operation Credible Sport was a joint project of the U.S. military in the second half of 1980 to prepare for a second rescue attempt of the hostages held in Iran. It was canceled after the hostages were released on 20 January 1981; for a short time thereafter, it appeared as if the task force would be disbanded and the personnel returned to their former units. The Army decided that it would be more prudent to keep the unit. The task force, which had been designated Task Force 158, was soon formed into the 160th Special Operations Aviation Regiment. The OH-6A helicopters used for transporting personnel became the MH-6 aircraft of the Light Assault Company. The armed OH-6As became the AH-6 aircraft of the Light Attack Company.

=== Operation Urgent Fury (Grenada) ===
On 25 October 1983, the OH-6s of 160th SOAR saw overt combat action for the first time in Grenada during Operation Urgent Fury. On D-Day, six MH-6 and two AH-6s were flown to the Eastern Caribbean island from Pope Air Force Base in North Carolina in the bellies of four Air Force C-130s. In addition to the helicopter air crews, the aircraft carried a company of US Army Rangers and a Delta Force squadron, units that were also part of the American assault forces. By the time the aircraft arrived over the island, other Rangers, flying separately from the US, had parachuted onto a nearly finished runway on Grenada's southwestern coast.

When the air-dropped Rangers secured the runway, the four C-130s landed and unloaded. The two AH-6s set off for the capital city of St. George's to attack Fort Rupert, the permanent Grenadian military headquarters. The “Little Birds” found air defenses around the capital to be too formidable and they returned to the airport within 10 minutes. This action appears to have given rise to later erroneous published speculation that an OH-6 was shot down on D-Day.

A planned MH-6 assault by the Ranger/Delta force on Fort Rupert, also known as Fort George, was cancelled because of the stiff antiaircraft resistance. It participated in other unscripted support tasks, including ferrying wounded servicemen to medical facilities on Navy ships offshore, and a search and rescue mission to a Black Hawk helicopter crash site.

None of these aircraft were listed in the public inventory of US military at the time. The existence of the secret aviation unit became widely known in the aftermath of the invasion, as OH-6s helicopters were photographed and filmed in action by civilians onlookers.

The CIA also deployed two highly modified, "silent" Hughes 500D helicopters to nearby Barbados in advance of the invasion. They were offered to the Pentagon's invasion commanders for clandestine reconnaissance purposes, but were not used by the military over Grenada during Urgent Fury.

=== Nicaragua ===
By 1983, 160th SOAR and its helicopters were heavily committed to supporting the Contras, a United States-subsidized military force. Specially adapted unmarked Hughes 500D helicopters from the CIA Seaspray unit based in Fort Eustis also took part in this task.

MH-6s were based in Palmerola Air Base, Honduras, and flew missions into Nicaragua. The unit members wore civilian clothes, flew by night, and were instructed to destroy their aircraft if they were forced down.

=== Iran-Iraq War ===
On 24 July 1987, a Kuwaiti oil tanker, reflagged as Bridgeton and escorted by U.S. Navy warships, struck a mine in the Persian Gulf. It became apparent that more than escort ships would be required to guard merchant ships. The U.S. military deployed the MH-6 and AH-6 aircraft from the 160th Special Operations Aviation Regiment (SOAR) to provide surveillance and patrols in cooperation with other U.S. special operations units in Operation Prime Chance.

Two MH-6 and four AH-6 aircraft were initially deployed and designated as Detachment 160 Aviation Group (DET 160 AVGP). The MH-6 aircraft carried Forward Looking Infra-Red (FLIR) and a videotape system which gave them excellent ability to detect and identify targets, then direct the armed AH-6s. The AH-6 helicopters were armed with 7.62 miniguns and 2.75-inch rockets. Initially, the aircraft patrolled in teams (call sign "SEABAT") that waited for U.S. Navy SH-2s to direct them to the targets. Later, to preserve the aircraft and crews from fatigue and wear, the SEABAT teams remained on the ship's deck until a contact was identified.

At 10 pm on 21 September 1987, the captain of USS Jarrett launched a SEABAT team (a MH-6 and two AH-6s) to check out reports of Iranian minelaying. The team found Iran Ajr, an amphibious landing ship equipped with minelaying racks. The MH-6 confirmed that Iran Ajr was laying mines, the AH-6s opened fire, leading to the crew abandoning the vessel, after which it was boarded and captured.

On the night of 8 October 1987, an Iranian Revolutionary Guard Corps Boghammar and two Boston Whaler boats were detected by an SH-2. A SEABAT team was launched from USS Ford (FFG-54), and as the MH-6 drew near to investigate, the Boghammar opened fire, the first of a series of engagements by both AH-6s and the MH-6 (recently armed with a minigun). The Boghammar launched two Stinger missiles at the helicopters, but eventually all three boats were sunk.

For the remainder of the operation, barges, set up as mobile sea bases (MSB), would facilitate the operation of the special operations forces. Hercules and Wimbrown VII were leased to provide these bases and the SEABAT teams began operating from the barges.

In early 1988, it was decided that modified U.S. Army OH-58D helicopters, fitted with weapons, would replace the SEABAT teams. On 24 February 1988, a team of two AHIP helicopters replaced the SEABAT team on the Wimbrown VII but it would be several months (June 1988) before the SEABAT team aboard the barge Hercules would be relieved by another AHIP detachment.

=== Operation Just Cause (Panama) ===
On 17 December 1989, 9 MH-6s, 11 AH-6G/Js, 19 UH/MH-60As were flown by Air Force C-5 Galaxy airlifters to Howard AFB's Hangar Three. After dark, on 19 December, the aircraft were rolled out to prepare for Operation Just Cause.

Before the main invasion force arrived in Panama City, Panama, two MH-6s supported by two AH-6s landed at Torrijos-Tocumen Airport to insert a beacon and combat controllers. Four other AH-6s conducted pre-assault attacks on the Panamanian Defense Force (PDF) Headquarters, La Comandancia, adjoining the heavily populated El Chorrillo neighborhood in downtown Panama City. One of the AH-6s was damaged by ground fire and crashlanded in the Comandancia compound. The two pilots, pinned down by small-arms fire for two hours, eventually made their way back to friendly forces, taking a PDF soldier prisoner along the way.

Other AH-6s escorted MH-6s on a rooftop rescue operation conducted at Cárcel Modelo, a prison adjacent to La Comandancia. In Operation Acid Gambit, the aircraft approached the prison. Under fire from a nearby apartment house, the Little Birds landed on the roof, dropped off the rescue team, and lifted off. Upon their return, heavy smoke made it tough to find the roof and the helicopters took heavy fire from a cellblock about 50 to 60 feet (18 m) from the landing site.

Maj. Richard Bowman, a copilot, took a round in the elbow, thus his pilot took over the controls and landed the aircraft. The aircraft picked up the rescue personnel and headed back toward Howard AFB, but one MH-6 lost power as it left the roof, and crashed in the street below with minor injuries to the passengers, who were helped from the crash site by US infantry soldiers.

Elsewhere, four AH-6s provided fire support for the airborne assault at Rio Hato Airfield, supported by an MH-60 which operated as a Forward Arming and Refueling Point (FARP). Two nine-man teams from the 160th participated in the airborne assaults of Torrijos-Tocumen Airfield and Rio Hato Airfield, and were dropped from Air Force C-141s to set up FARPs, 12-foot (3.7 m) platforms with HE-rocket and minigun ammunition, parts and replacements for the miniguns, and fuel and refueling pumps, hoses, etc. But the FARP dropped at Rio Hato landed out of reach in a marsh, forcing the team to "wet wing" refuel from the MH-60.

The Rio Hato mission originally included nine other MH-60s and four MH-6s. Several hours prior to H-hour, these aircraft and crews were instead sent to support a raid near Colón, Panama, a key PDF stronghold where PDF leaders were believed to be. At H-hour, the helicopters conducted an air assault on a beach house along the coast of Colon. It was during this mission that the first 160th soldiers to die in combat perished when their AH-6 was shot down.

Another force of eight MH-60s and four MH-6s waited on the airstrip with crew aboard, to conduct follow-on raids should the need arise.

After these initial missions, elements of the 160th provided support to special operations forces securing outlying areas, recovering weapons caches, and "hunt for Elvis" – the phrase the men of the 160th used to refer to the search for General Manuel Noriega. Four MH-60s, two MH-6s, two AH-6s, and two MH-47s were moved to Ft. Sherman in the north for operations in and around Colon.

The 160th conducted numerous air assault missions over the next two weeks, and on 3 January 1990, the majority of the force went back to Fort Campbell, Kentucky.

The crashed aircraft was recovered and reassembled. It is now on static display at the American Helicopter Museum & Education Center in West Chester, Pennsylvania.

=== Somali Civil War ===
MH-6 Little Birds were part of the initial assault near the Olympic Hotel in the Bakara Market of Mogadishu, Somalia. The MH-6s conducted rooftop insertions of Delta Force soldiers.

After the shootdown of the MH-60L, call sign "Super Six-One", by a rocket-propelled grenade (RPG), an MH-6 Little Bird, call sign "Star Four-One", landed in the street next to the downed MH-60 and attempted to evacuate the casualties. The pilot went to assist survivors, successfully pulling two soldiers into the Little Bird, while the copilot laid down suppressive fire from the cockpit with his individual weapon. Under intense ground fire, the MH-6 departed with its crew and survivors.

During the night, AH-6J gunships provided fire support to Rangers and Delta Force operators who were in defensive positions around the crash site of "Super Six-One" and under constant fire from Warlord Mohammad Farrah Aidid's militia members.

=== Global War on Terrorism ===
==== Iraq War ====
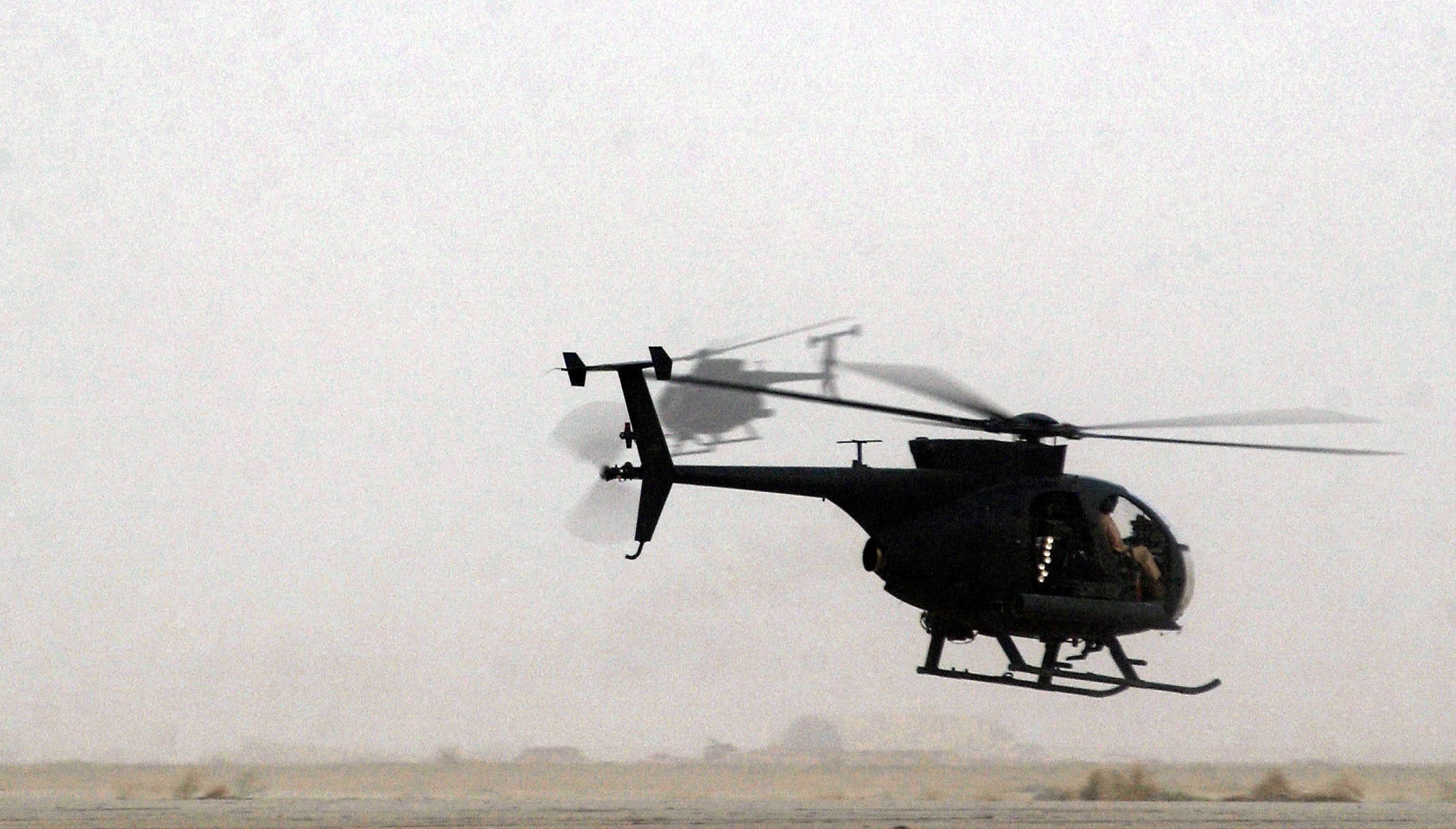
Two AH-6J Little Birds take off for a mission during Operation Iraqi Freedom in 2003.

During the invasion of Iraq in 2003 and up until the end of the war in late 2011, Little Bird pilots took part in numerous missions. Two AH-6 and two MH-6 helicopters were part of a special operations raid at Al Qadisiyah in western Iraq. AH-6 and MH-6 gave support for the 75th Ranger Regiment during its seizure of the Haditha Dam complex in April 2003.

AH-6 helicopters supported the rescue mission of Private First Class Jessica Lynch in April 2003.

MH-6 helicopters were part of TF-145, as well as the rescue of three Italian contractors and Polish businessman taken hostage by Iraqi insurgents in 2004.

An MH-6, from Task Force Brown (aka Task Force 160) was shot down by ground fire on Sunday 14 May 2006 during a daylight operation against an Iraqi target, in Yusufiyah. Despite the efforts of both UK and US Forces, the two men died inside the wreck.

==== Operation Celestial Balance ====
In September 2009, two AH-6 and two MH-6 helicopters were used in an operation in Somalia by United States Navy SEALs to kill wanted terrorist Saleh Ali Saleh Nabhan.

=== Seizure of the Russian oil tanker Marinera ===
US AH-6 helicopters were involved in the seizure of the Russian oil tanker Marinera in the North Atlantic Ocean on 7 January 2026.

=== Iran war (2026) ===
On 5 April 2026, amid the 2026 Iran war, four MH-6 stationed at a makeshift airbase in Iran were destroyed by U.S. forces along with a pair of MC-130J in order to prevent them from being seized by Iranian military. This happened during a CSAR operation to rescue a WSO of an F-15E that was shot down by Iranian military two days prior.

== Variants ==
For OH-6 and TH-6 variants, see Hughes OH-6 Cayuse.

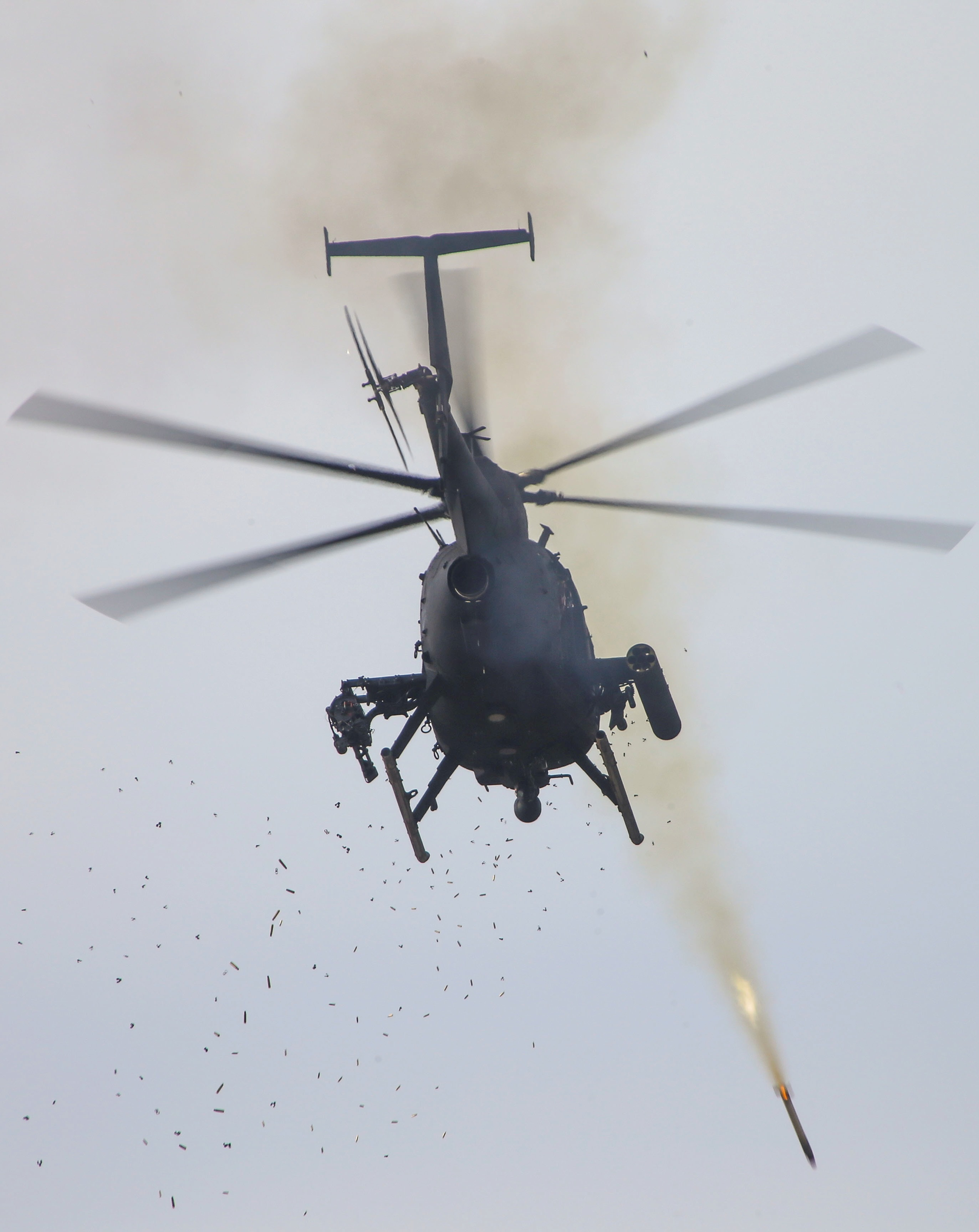
A US Army AH-6M attacking targets during an air support exercise

AH-6C
Special Operations attack version. Modified OH-6A to carry weapons and operate as a light attack aircraft for the 160th SOAR(A).
EH-6E
Special Operations electronic warfare, command-post version.
MH-6E
Improved attack helicopter used by US Army special forces units, and stealthy light attack and transport helicopter for US Army special forces units.
AH-6F
Special Operations attack version.
AH-6G
Special Operations attack version.
MH-6H
Special Operations version.
AH/MH-6J
Improved special operations transport and attack versions. Updated light attack helicopter based on the MD 530MG and equipped with an improved engine, FLIR, and a GPS/inertial navigation system.

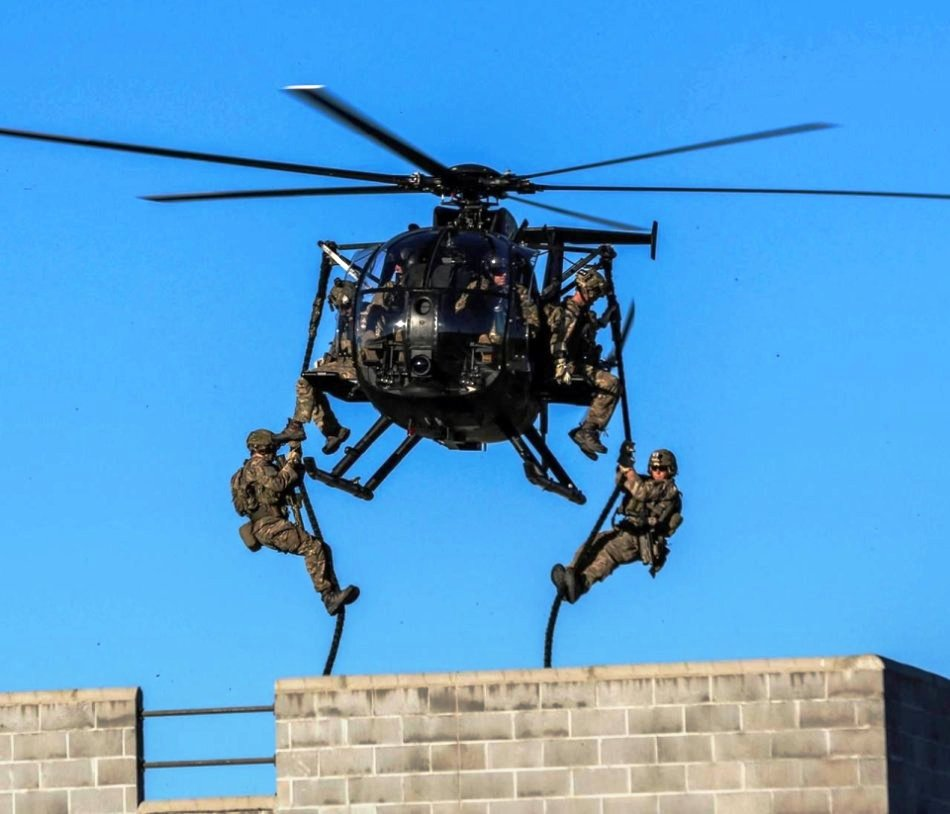
A 160th SOAR(A) MH-6M equipped with the FRIES fast-roping system inserts a team of 75th Army Rangers on a building's roof during a CQB exercise.

AH/MH-6M
Also occasionally referred to as the Mission Enhanced Little Bird (MELB), it is a highly modified version of the MD 530 series commercial helicopter. All MH-6 helicopters to be modernized to MH-6M standard by 2015.
A/MH-6X
An AH/MH-6M MELB helicopter modified for use as a UAV. It builds upon experience gained through development of the Unmanned Little Bird (ULB) Demonstrator, which is a civil MD 530F modified for autonomous UAV flight. Boeing has announced that this version is marketed solely to other nations, not the U.S., for use as a low-cost attack helicopter. However, Boeing is planning to enter it in the U.S. Army's Armed Aerial Scout program.
KUS-VH
Korean Air Aerospace Division (KAL-ASD) have developed an armed, unmanned version of the Little Bird with Korean armed forces in mind. The KUS-VH is unlike Boeing's H-6U Unmanned Little Bird (ULB) in that, the former is completely unmanned while Boeing's ULB may be operated either manned or unmanned. The vehicle can be controlled from a ground station. However, Gareth Jennings of Jane's International Defense Review suggests the platform may be employed in a 'manned-unmanned teaming' (MUM-T) system alongside the AH-64E in a scouting/recon role to facilitate 'over the horizon' maneuvers to flush out enemy forces. Further, the Republic of Korea has over 150 MH-6 Little Bird's which can be, on request, converted to the design.

== Operators ==
United States

- United States Army Aviation

Republic of Korea

- Republic of Korea Army

Thailand

- Royal Thai Army

== Specifications (MH-6) ==

Data from U.S. Army Aircraft, MD 530F data

General characteristics

- Crew: 2
- Capacity: up to six passengers for MH-6 / 1,509 lb (684 kg)
- Length: 32 ft 7.2 in (9.936 m) including rotors

24 ft 7.2 in (7.50 m) fuselage only

- Width: 4 ft 7.2 in (1.402 m)
- Height: 8 ft 9 in (2.67 m)
- Empty weight: 1,591 lb (722 kg)
- Max takeoff weight: 3,100 lb (1,406 kg)
- Fuel capacity: 62 US gal (52 imp gal; 235 L) / 403 lb (183 kg)
- Powerplant: 1 × Allison T63-A-5A or T63-A-700 turboshaft engine, 425 hp (317 kW) for take-off (de-rated)

375 shp (280 kW) at maximum continuous rpm

- Main rotor diameter: 27 ft 4.8 in (8.352 m)
- Main rotor area: 587.8 sq ft (54.61 m^{2})
- Blade section: NACA 0012

Performance

- Maximum speed: 152 kn (175 mph, 282 km/h)
- Cruise speed: 135 kn (155 mph, 250 km/h)
- Range: 232 nmi (267 mi, 430 km) at 5,000 ft (1,524 m)
- Service ceiling: 18,700 ft (5,700 m)
- Rate of climb: 2,061 ft/min (10.47 m/s)

Armament

- Guns:

- 2× 12.7×99mm (.50 BMG) GAU-19; or
- 2× 7.62×51mm NATO M134 Minigun

- Rockets:

- 2× LAU-68D/A seven-tube rocket pods firing 2.75 in (70 mm) Hydra 70 rocket projectiles

- Missiles:

- 4× AGM-114 Hellfire or
- 4× FIM-92 Stinger

== See also ==
- U.S. Helicopter Armament Subsystems

Related development

- Hughes OH-6 Cayuse
- MD Helicopters MD 500
- MD Helicopters Defender
- Boeing AH-6

Aircraft of comparable role, configuration, and era

- Bell OH-58 Kiowa
- Bell ARH-70 Arapaho
- PZL SW-4 Puszczyk

Related lists

- List of active United States military aircraft
