= MD 600 =

MD 600 may refer to:

- MD Helicopters MD 600
- Maryland Route 600
