= Hughes TH-55 Osage =

Piston-powered light training helicopter produced for the United States Army

TH-55 Osage Hughes 269
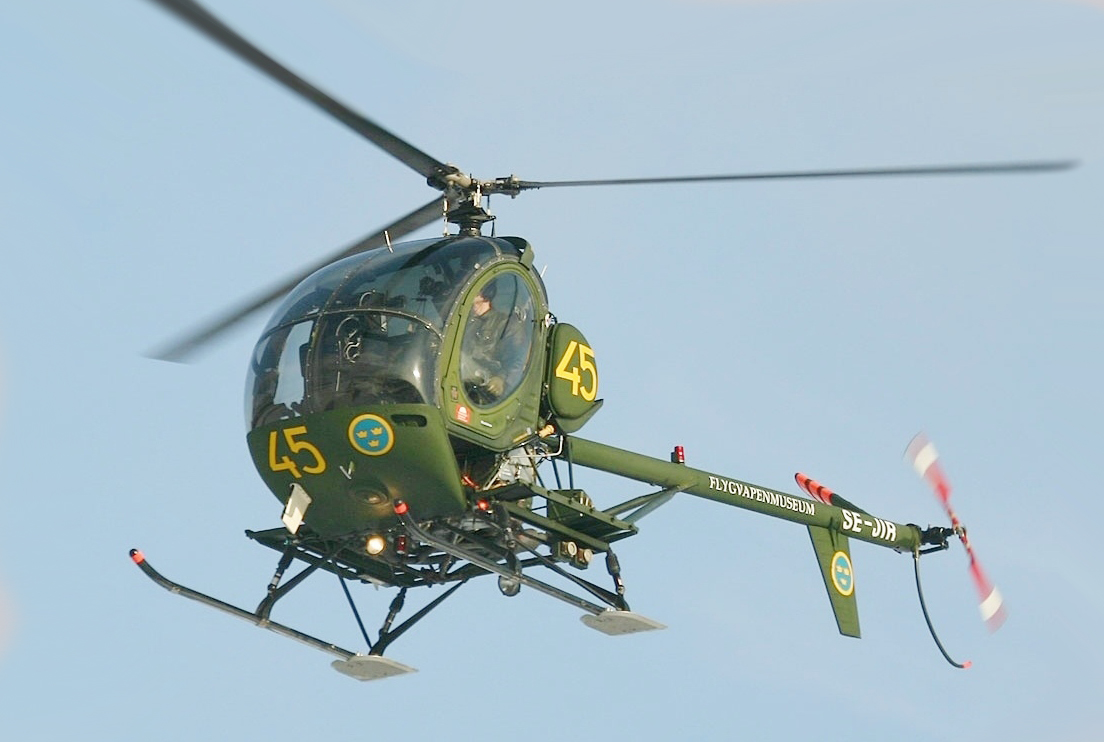
- A Schweizer 300C with the Swedish Air Force Museum

General information
- Type: Light utility and trainer helicopter
- Manufacturer: Hughes Helicopters
- Primary user: United States Army
- Number built: 2,800

History
- Manufactured: 1961–1983
- First flight: 2 October 1956
- Variant: Schweizer S300

The Hughes TH-55 Osage is a piston-powered light training helicopter produced for the United States Army. It was also produced as the Model 269 family of light utility helicopters, some of which were marketed as the Model 300. The Model 300C was produced and further developed by Schweizer after 1983.

== Development ==
In 1955, Hughes Tool Company's Aircraft Division carried out a market survey which showed that there was a demand for a low-cost lightweight twin-seat helicopter. In response, the division launched development of the Model 269 in September 1955, initially being carried out as a private venture. It was a remarkably light rotorcraft, being half the weight of the smallest operational helicopter in the mid 1950s. In February 1957, a Hughes spokesperson claimed the type to possess a good rate of climb, modest fuel consumption and provide for ease of maintenance.

As originally designed, the new rotorcraft had a fully-glazed cockpit with seating for either a pair of pilots or a pilot and passenger. It also had an open-framework fuselage and a three-blade articulated rotor. On 2 October 1956, the prototype conducted its maiden flight. However, it would be another four years before decision makers authorised further work to put the helicopter into quantity production. During this time, the original truss-work tailboom was replaced with a tubular counterpart while the cockpit was restructured and refined prior to being put into production, resulting in the Model 269A. Through this model, Hughes successfully captured a large portion of the civilian helicopter market; the type would also prove itself popular in agriculture and police work amongst other duties.

== Design ==
The Hughes 269 is a relatively compact rotorcraft. In a typical training configuration, the instructor and student are both provisioned with a complete set of flight controls and are seated side by side. While the 269 is generally outfitted with two sets of controls, this was only an optional arrangement on the civil 269A. To permit the use of a three-seat configuration, the middle collective control stick can be removed and a seat cushion can be put in its place for the third passenger.

The dynamic systems of the 269 comprise a fully articulated three-blade main rotor (designed by the Serbian-American aeronautical engineer Drago Jovanovich) and a two-blade tail rotor that would remain as distinctive characteristics of all its variants. It also has shock absorber-damped skid-type landing gear. On account of there being no hydraulic systems in the 269, the flight controls are directly linked to the swashplate instead.

== Operational history ==
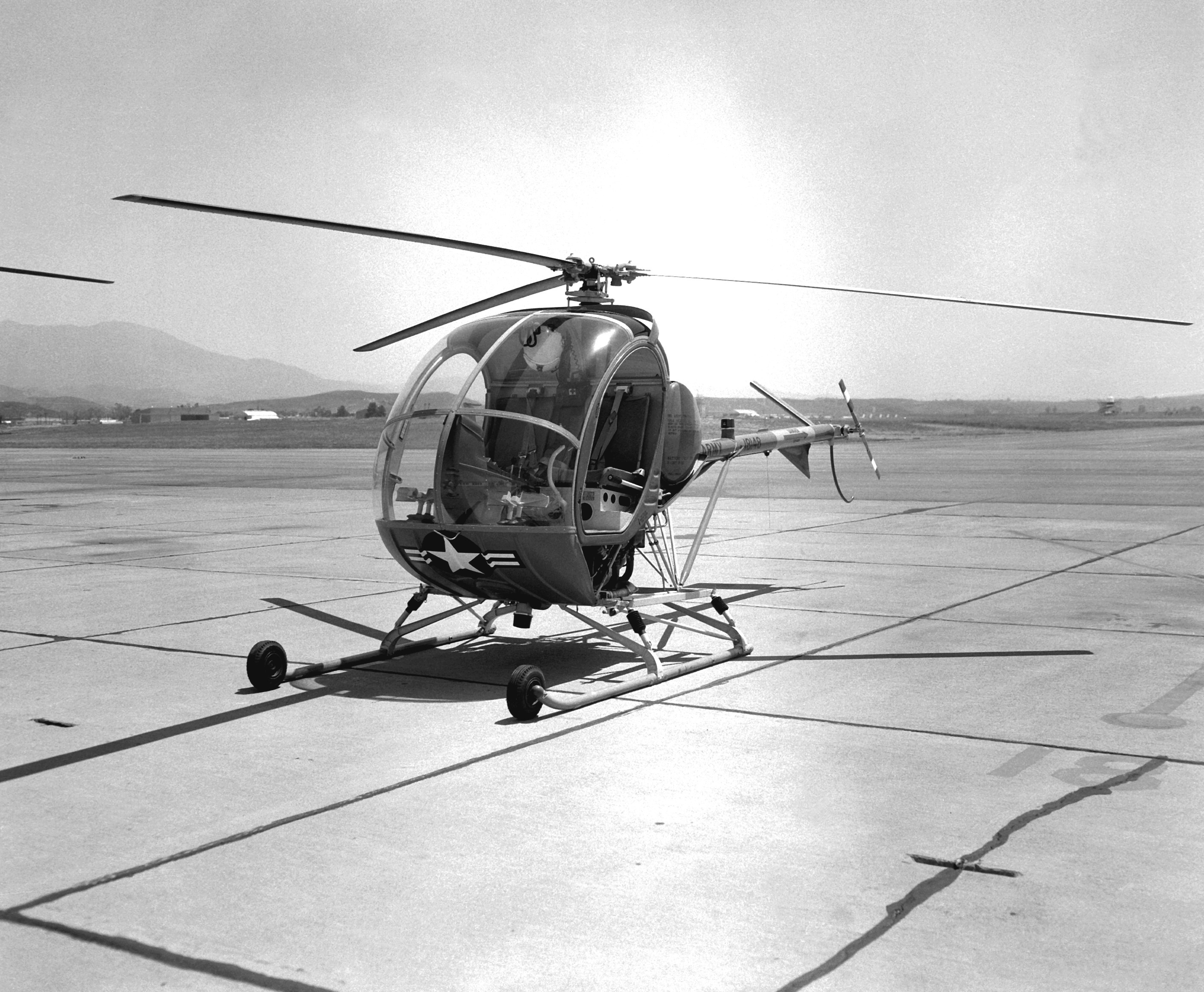
TH-55A Osage helicopter parked on the flightline at Marine Corps Air Station El Toro, California in 1966.

In 1958, prior to the type attaining full-time production, Hughes provided five preproduction Model 269A examples to the United States Army (US Army) for evaluation as a light observation helicopter to replace the piston-powered OH-13 Sioux and OH-23 Raven. Designated as the YHO-2HU the helicopter was eventually turned down. On 9 April 1959, the 269A received type certification from the Federal Aviation Administration (FAA). Hughes continued to concentrate on civil production, and deliveries of the Model 269A began in 1961. By mid-1963, about 20 aircraft were being produced each month and by the spring of 1964, 314 helicopters had been completed.

While the US Army had not found the Model 269A adequate for combat missions, in 1964 it adopted a modified version of the 269A as its training helicopter to replace the TH-23 and designated it the TH-55A Osage. By 1969, 792 TH-55s had been delivered to the service, and it would remain in service as the US Army's primary helicopter trainer until the type was replaced in 1988 by the UH-1 Huey. At the time of its replacement, over 60,000 US Army pilots had trained on TH-55, making it the service's longest serving training helicopter. In addition to the US Army, Hughes delivered TH-55/269/300s to other several military customers.

In 1964, Hughes introduced the slightly larger three-seat Model 269B, which was marketed as the Hughes 300. That same year, the Hughes 269 set an endurance record of 101 hours. To set the record, two pilots took turns piloting the aircraft and hovered in ground-effect for fueling. To ensure no cheating, eggs were attached to the bottom of the skid gear to register any record-ending landing.

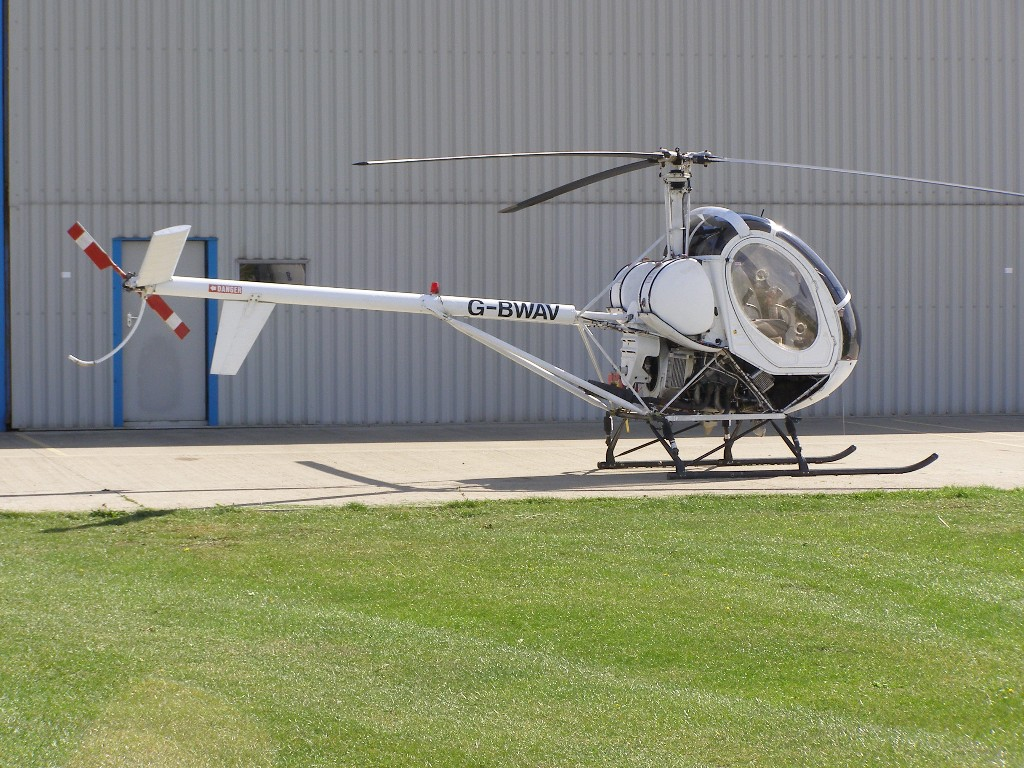
Schweizer 300C

The Hughes 300 was followed in 1969 by the improved Hughes 300C (sometimes 269C), which first flew on March 6, 1969, and received FAA certification in May 1970. This new model introduced a more powerful 190 hp (140 kW) Lycoming HIO-360-D1A engine and an increased-diameter rotor, giving a payload increase of 45%, plus overall performance improvements. It was this model that Schweizer began building under license from Hughes in 1983. In 1986, Schweizer acquired all rights to the helicopter from McDonnell Douglas, who had purchased Hughes Helicopters in 1984, and renamed it McDonnell Douglas Helicopter Systems. For a few years after, Schweizer acquired the FAA Type Certificate known as the Schweizer-Hughes 300. While Schweizer made over 250 minor improvements, the basic design remained unchanged.

Between Hughes and Schweizer, and including foreign-licensed production civil and military training aircraft, nearly 3,000 copies of the Model 269/300 have been built and flown over the last 50 years. That would have been the end of the story, but Schweizer continued to develop the model 300 by adding a turbine and redesigning the body to create the model 330m, and then further developed the dynamic components to take greater advantage of the power of the turbine engine; this led to the development of the Model 333.

== Variants ==
=== Model numbers ===
269
Two prototype aircraft powered by a 180 hp Lycoming O-360-A engine and had a truss tailboom. First flown on 2 October 1956.
269A
Replacing the prototype's truss tailboom with a simple aluminum tube as the tailboom, the 269A came with the option for several models of Lycoming O-360 engines: the carbureted O-360-C2D, restricted to 165 hp (123 kW) in the 269A, or the carbureted HO-360-B1A/B1B or fuel-injected HIO-360-B1A/B1B, all rated for 180 hp (134 kW) in the 269A. (Note: Even though Francillon claims that the -C2D was a lower-compression engine intended for 80/87 octane fuel, the FAA's type certificate data sheet 4H12 for the Hughes 269A specifies the same 91/96 octane fuel for all these engine versions, and type certificate data sheets E-286 and 1E10 for the Lycoming O-360 and IO-360 families give the same compression ratio of 8.5 for the O-360-C2D, HO-360-B1A, HO-360-B1B, HIO-360-B1A, and HIO-360-B1B.) Customers also had the option for dual controls, and a 19 gal (72 liter) auxiliary tank. The maximum weight was 1,550 lb (703 kg); later this could be increased to 1,600 lb (726 kg) if certain modifications were performed.
269A-1 "Model 200"
The 269A-1, which Hughes marketed as the Model 200, was an improved version of the 269A certified by the FAA on August 23, 1963. Powered by the 180 hp (134 kW) fuel-injected Lycoming HIO-360-B1A or -B1B, and with its maximum weight increased to 1,670 lb (757 kg), the Model 200 also had the option for either a 30 gal (114 liter) or 25 gal (95 liter) main fuel tank. Hughes sold two versions of the Model 200: the ordinary Model 200 Utility and the Model 200 Deluxe with added custom interior decor and electrically operated trim for the cyclic control.
269B "Model 300"
Featuring a three-seat cockpit, the 269B was powered by a 190 hp (141 kW) Lycoming HIO-360-A1A engine and was marketed as the Hughes Model 300. Optional floats were also available on the 300, the first time available on any 269-variant.
280U
single-seat, utility version of the 269B with an electric clutch and trim system. The 280U could be fitted with spraying equipment for agricultural applications.
300AG
269B designed specifically for agricultural spraying with a 30 gal (114 liter) chemical tank on each side of the fuselage, and a 35 feet (10.67 m) spray boom.
300B
269B with a Quiet Tail Rotor installed to reduce exterior noise levels to that of a light airplane. The QTR was installed on all production models starting in June 1967 and offered as a kit for previously built aircraft.

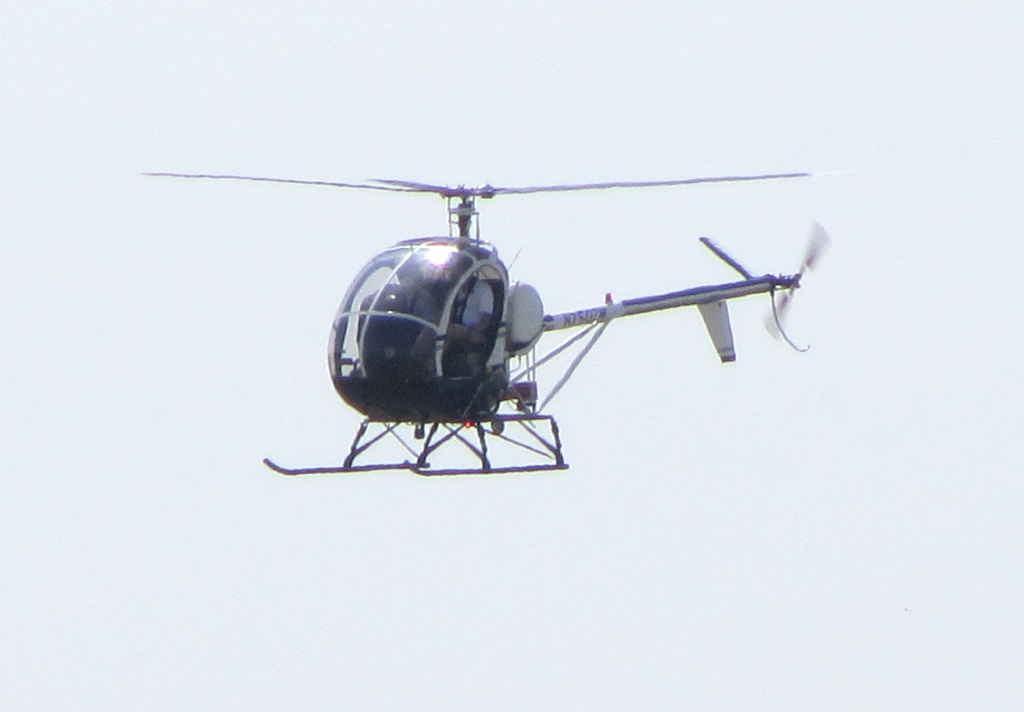
1989 Model 269C

269C "Model 300C"
The 300C was powered by a 190 hp (141 kW) Lycoming HIO-360-D1A and had a larger diameter main rotor - 26 ft 10 in (8.18 m) compared to 25 ft 4 in (7.72 m). The larger rotor and engine giving it a 45% performance increase over previous 269-models. Hughes and Schweizer both marketed the 269C as the Model 300C.
NH-300C
License-built 269C by Italian aircraft manufacturing firm BredaNardi.
300C Sky Knight
Police patrol version of the Model 300C.
TH-300C
Military training version.

=== Military designations ===
YHO-2
Five 269A aircraft were evaluated by the U.S. Army for an observation helicopter in 1957-58, originally designated XH-42. The Army did not order the YHO-2 due to lack of funds.
TH-55A
Military version of the 269A-1 (Model 200) built for the U.S. Army as its standard primary training helicopter and named after the Osage Native American tribe; student pilots nicknamed it the "Mattel Messerschmitt". Although basically the same as the Model 200, the TH-55A was fitted with military radio and instrumentation. 792 TH-55As were purchased by the Army between 1964 and 1967. An experimental TH-55A was fitted with an Allison 250-C18 turboshaft engine, and another would be fitted with a 185 hp (138 kW) Wankel RC 2-60 rotary engine.
TH-55J
38 license-produced versions of the TH-55A, built by Kawasaki for the Japanese Ground Self-Defense Force.
IH-2
Brazilian Navy designation for the Model 269A. Originally designated HTH-1.
IH-2A
Brazilian Navy designation for the Model 269A-1.
IH-2B
Brazilian Navy designation for the Model 269B.

== Operators ==
=== Algeria ===
- Algerian Air Force

=== Brazil ===
- Brazilian Navy

=== Colombia ===
- Colombian Air Force

=== Costa Rica ===
- Ministry of Public Security

=== Greece ===
- Hellenic Army - operates 20 Breda Nardi NH300C in training role.

=== Haiti ===
- Haiti Air Force

=== Honduras ===
- Honduran Air Force

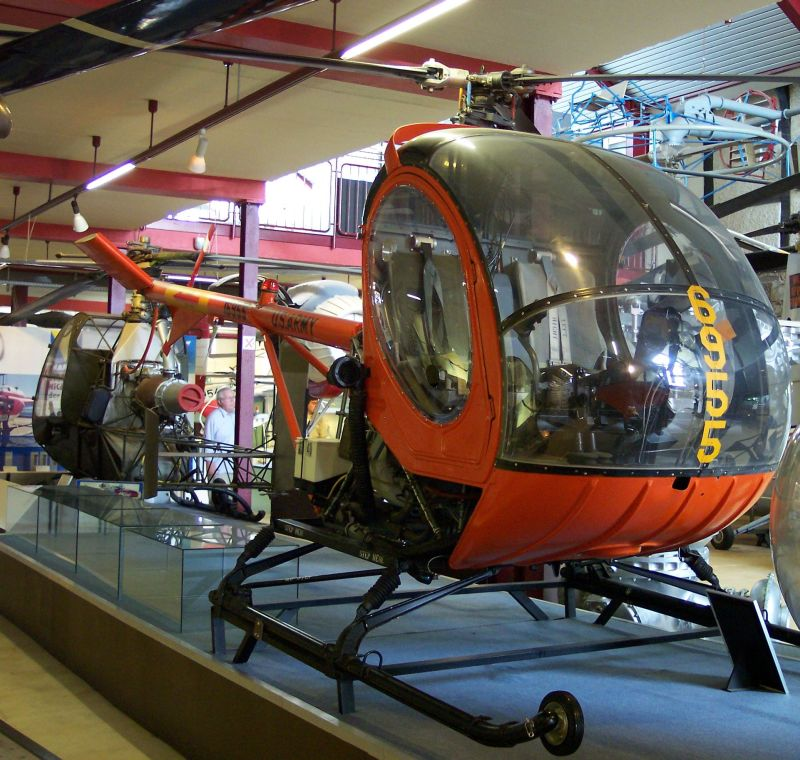
A TH-55 Osage on display at the Hubschraubermuseum Bückeburg museum, Germany

=== India ===
- Indian Navy

=== Japan ===
- Japanese Ground Self-Defense Force

=== Peru ===
- Peruvian Air Force

=== Philippines ===
- Philippine Air Force- 2 units

=== Sierra Leone ===
- Sierra Leone Air Arm

=== Spain ===
- Spanish Air Force

=== Sweden ===
- Swedish Army

=== Taiwan ===
- Republic of China Army

=== Thailand ===
- Royal Thai Army

=== Turkey ===
- Turkish Army

=== USA ===
- United States Army

== Specifications (Hughes 300) ==
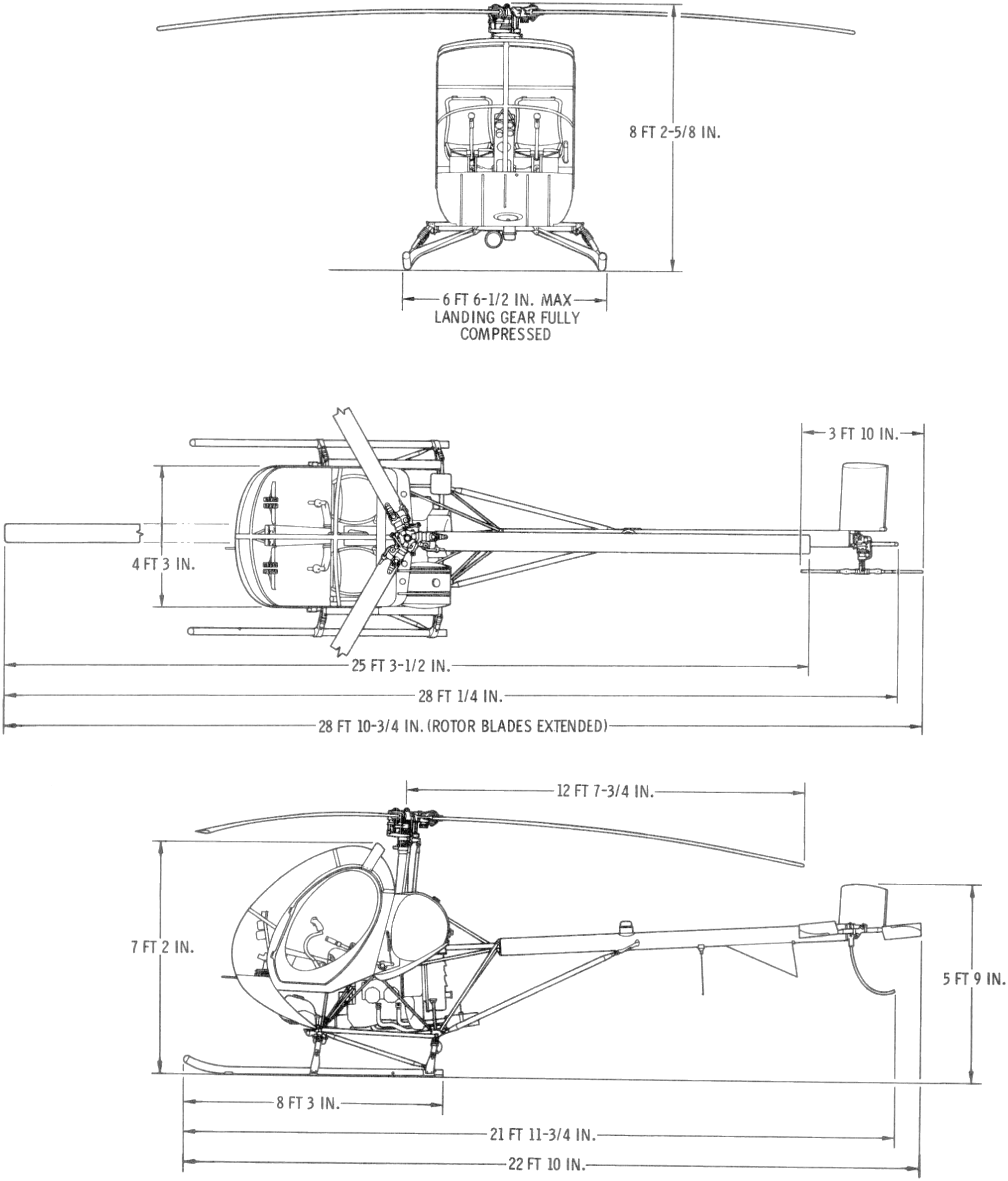
3-view line drawing of the Hughes TH-55A Osage

Data from Jane's All the World's Aircraft 1974-75, Evergreen Aviation and Space Museum

General characteristics

- Crew: 2
- Length: 28 ft 10.75 in (8.81 m)
- Height: 8 ft 2.75 in (2.51 m) overall
- Empty weight: 958 lb (435 kg)
- Gross weight: 1,550 lb (703 kg)
- Max takeoff weight: 1,670 lb (757 kg) certificated

1,850 lb (839 kg) maximum weight with restricted operations

- Fuel capacity: 30 US gal (25 imp gal; 110 L) in external mounted tank with provision for a 10 US gal (8.3 imp gal; 38 L) auxiliary tank.
- Powerplant: 1 × Lycoming HIO-360-A1A four-cylinder air-cooled horizontally-opposed piston engine., 180 hp (130 kW)

(HIO-360-B1A in TH-55A)

- Main rotor diameter: 25 ft 3.5 in (7.71 m)
- Main rotor area: 503 sq ft (46.7 m^{2})
- Blade section: NACA 0015

Performance

- Maximum speed: 87 mph (140 km/h, 76 kn)
- Cruise speed: 80 mph (130 km/h, 70 kn) maximum

66 mph (57 kn; 106 km/h) economical.

- Never exceed speed: 87 mph (140 km/h, 76 kn)
- Maximum water contact speed (on floats): 20 mph (17 kn; 32 km/h)
- Maximum water taxi speed (on floats): 10 mph (9 kn; 16 km/h)
- Range: 300 mi (480 km, 260 nmi) with maximum fuel and no reserve.
- Endurance: three hours and 30 minutes with maximum fuel.
- Service ceiling: 13,000 ft (4,000 m)
- Hover ceiling IGE: 7,700 ft (2,300 m)
- Hover ceiling OGE: 5,800 ft (1,800 m)
- Rate of climb: 1,140 ft/min (5.8 m/s)
- Disk loading: 3.3 lb/sq ft (16 kg/m^{2})
- Power/mass: 0.107 hp/lb (0.176 kW/kg)

== See also ==
Related development

- Schweizer 300

Aircraft of comparable role, configuration, and era

- Bell 47
- OH-23 Raven
- Robinson R22

Related lists

- List of most-produced rotorcraft
