= Hughes Helicopters =

Former military vehicle company

Hughes Helicopters, Inc.
- Hughes Helicopters logo

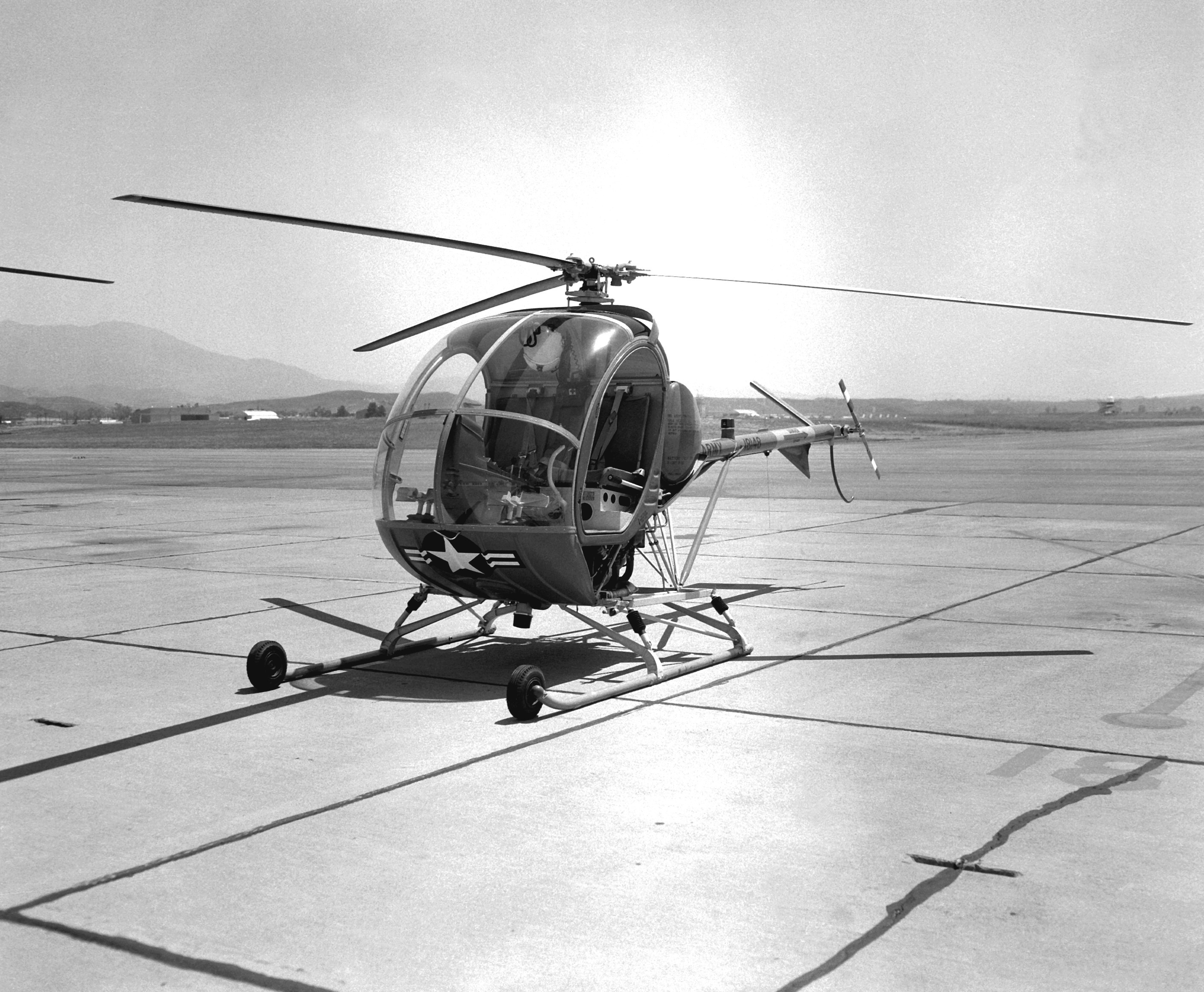
- TH-55 Osage
- Industry: Aerospace
- Founded: 1947; 79 years ago
- Defunct: 1984
- Fate: Acquired by McDonnell Douglas
- Successor: McDonnell Douglas Helicopter Systems
- Headquarters: Culver City, California, United States

Hughes Helicopters was a major manufacturer of military and civilian helicopters from the 1950s to the 1980s.

The company began in 1947, as a unit of Hughes Aircraft, then was part of the Hughes Tool Company after 1955. It became the Hughes Helicopter Division, Summa Corporation in 1972, and was reformed as Hughes Helicopters, Inc. in 1981. However, throughout its history, the company was informally known as "Hughes Helicopters". It was sold to McDonnell Douglas in 1984 and made a subsidiary under the name McDonnell Douglas Helicopter Systems, which was later renamed MD Helicopters when McDonnell Douglas merged with Boeing.

== History ==
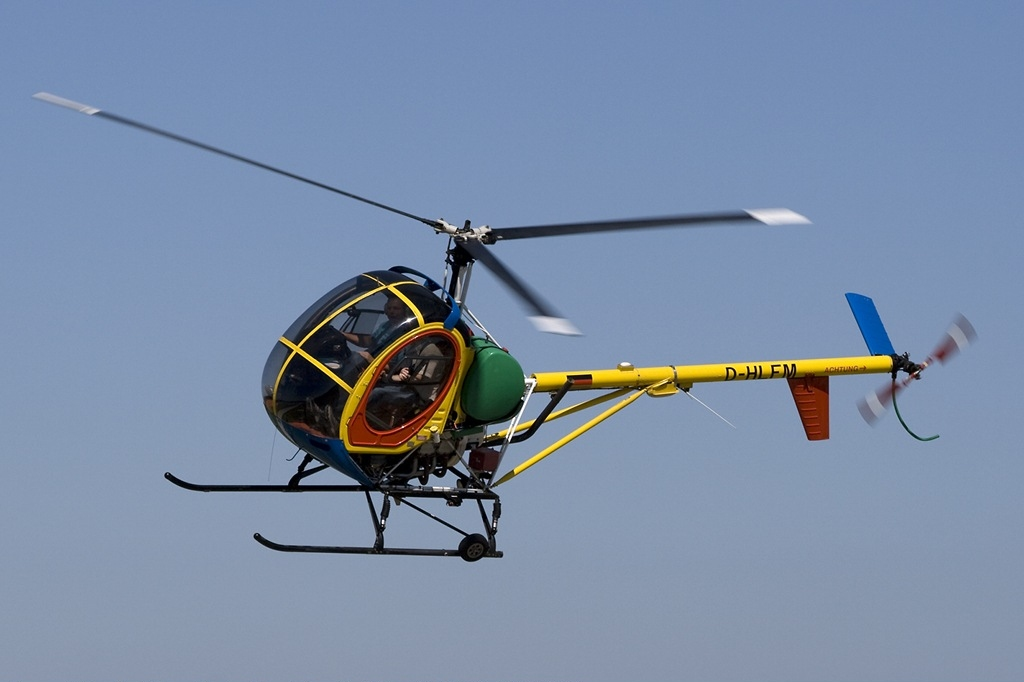
The Hughes Model 269 was known to the U.S. Army as the TH-55 Osage.

In 1947, Howard Hughes redirected the Hughes Aircraft Company's efforts from airplanes to helicopters. The effort began in earnest in 1948, when helicopter manufacturer Kellett Autogiro Corporation sold its latest design to Hughes for production. The XH-17 "Sky Crane" first flew in October 1952, but was commercially unsuccessful. In 1955 the company began building light helicopters when Howard Hughes split the helicopter production unit from the Hughes Aircraft Co., and reconstituted it with the Hughes Tool Co. as the Hughes Tool Co. Aircraft Division, with a focus on the production of light helicopters.

The Hughes Model 269 was the company's first successful helicopter design. Built in 1956, and entering production in 1957, it served to capture a large portion of the commercial market for Hughes. It would eventually become part of the Army inventory as a primary trainer (TH-55 Osage). In May 1965, the company won the contract for a new observation helicopter for the U.S. Army, and produced the OH-6 Cayuse (Hughes Model 369). The OH-6 was later developed into the civilian Model 500, variants of which remain in production to this day.

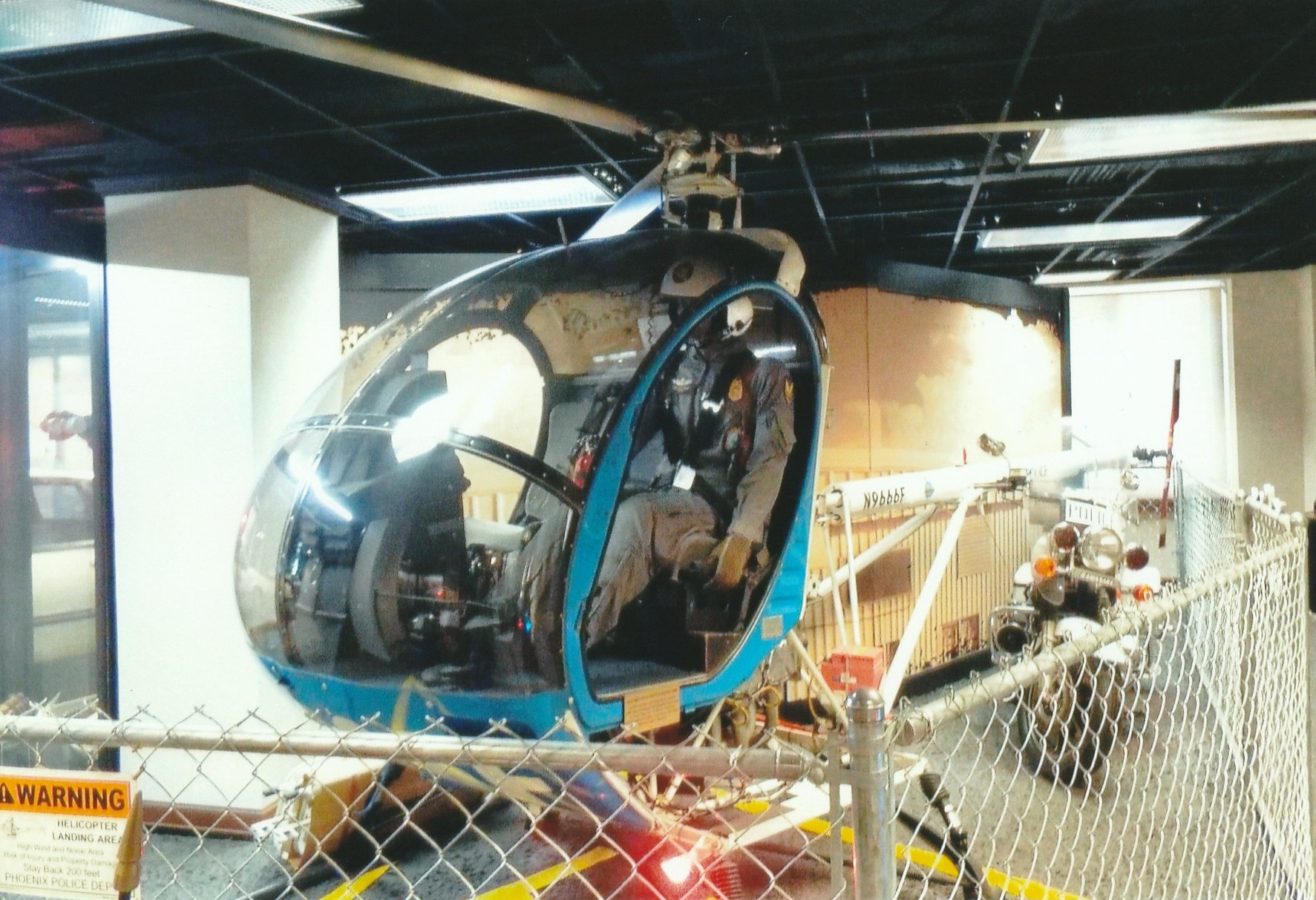
On display in the Phoenix Police Museum is the first helicopter, a Hughes Model 300C, used by the Phoenix Police Department in 1974

In 1972, Hughes sold the tool division of Hughes Tool Company, and reconsolidated his remaining holdings as the Summa Corporation, which included Hughes' property and other businesses. The Aircraft Division became the Hughes Helicopter Division, Summa Corp. That same year, the US Army issued a request for proposals (RFP) for an Advanced Attack Helicopter (AAH). From an initial list of 5 manufacturers Hughes Aircraft's Toolco Aircraft Division (later Hughes Helicopters) and Bell were selected as finalists. In 1975, Hughes' Model 77/YAH-64 was selected over Bell's YAH-63. First flight of a development prototype occurred in 1977. Also in 1975, Hughes engineers at began concept development work of NOTAR.

In 1981, Summa's Hughes Helicopter Division was reconstituted as Hughes Helicopters, Inc.. By December, six AH-64A prototypes had been built and the Army had awarded a purchase contract to the company. Production would reach more than 1,100 by 2005. In 1983, the first production model AH-64 rolled off the production line at the company's new Mesa, Arizona facility. That same year, the company was honored by the National Aeronautic Association with the prestigious Collier Trophy. The company also licensed Schweizer Aircraft to produce the Model 300C.

In January 1984, Hughes Helicopters, Inc. was sold to McDonnell Douglas by Summa Corporation, under the parent's efforts to streamline its focus and interest in real estate development. McDonnell Douglas paid $470 million for the company and made it a subsidiary. Hughes Helicopters was renamed McDonnell Douglas Helicopter Systems later in August 1984. Although the direct link with Hughes was broken, the helicopter designs created by Hughes Helicopters would continue to be produced by Boeing Rotorcraft Systems, MD Helicopters, and Schweizer RSG.

== Aircraft ==
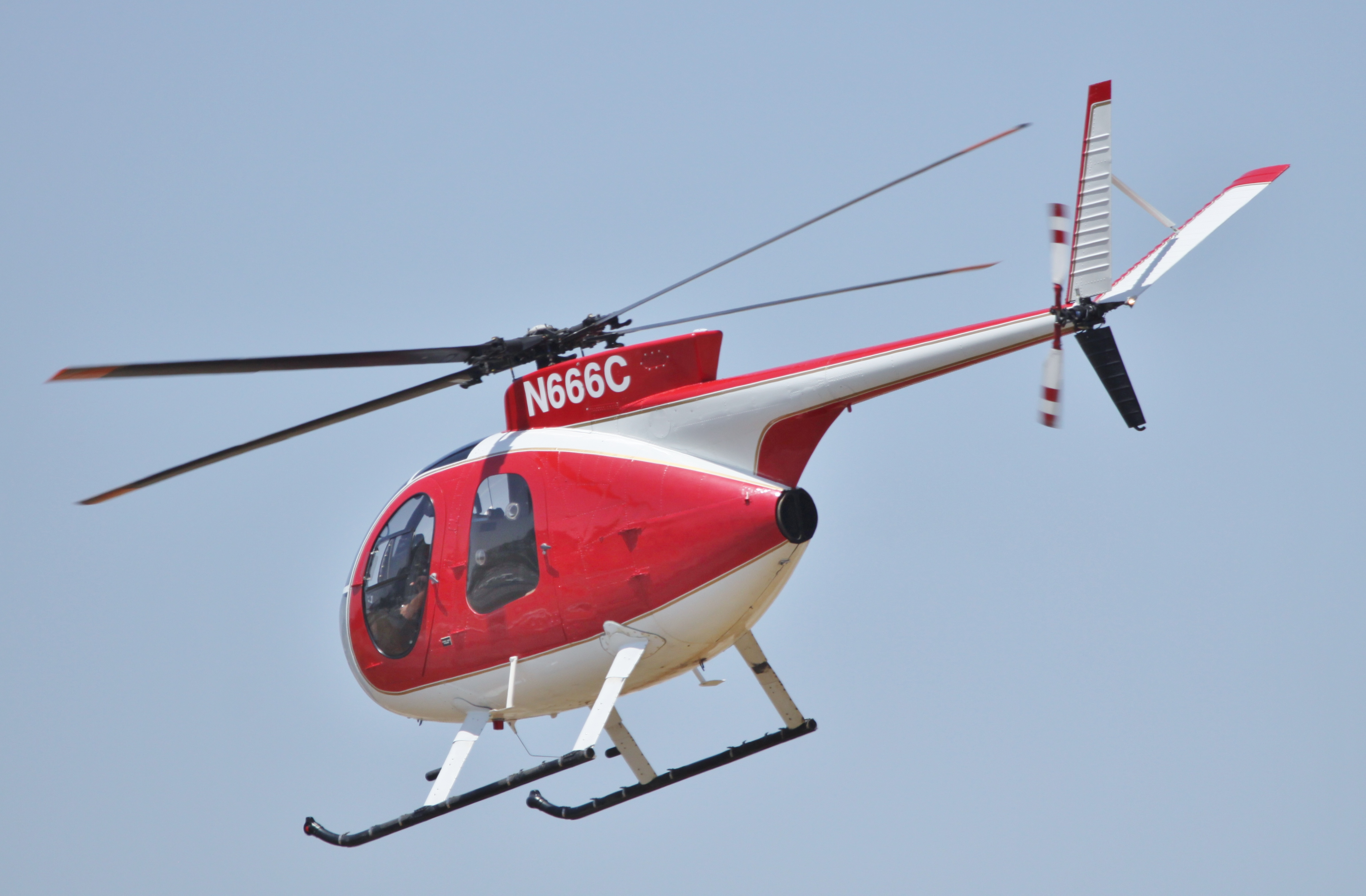
Hughes Model 369

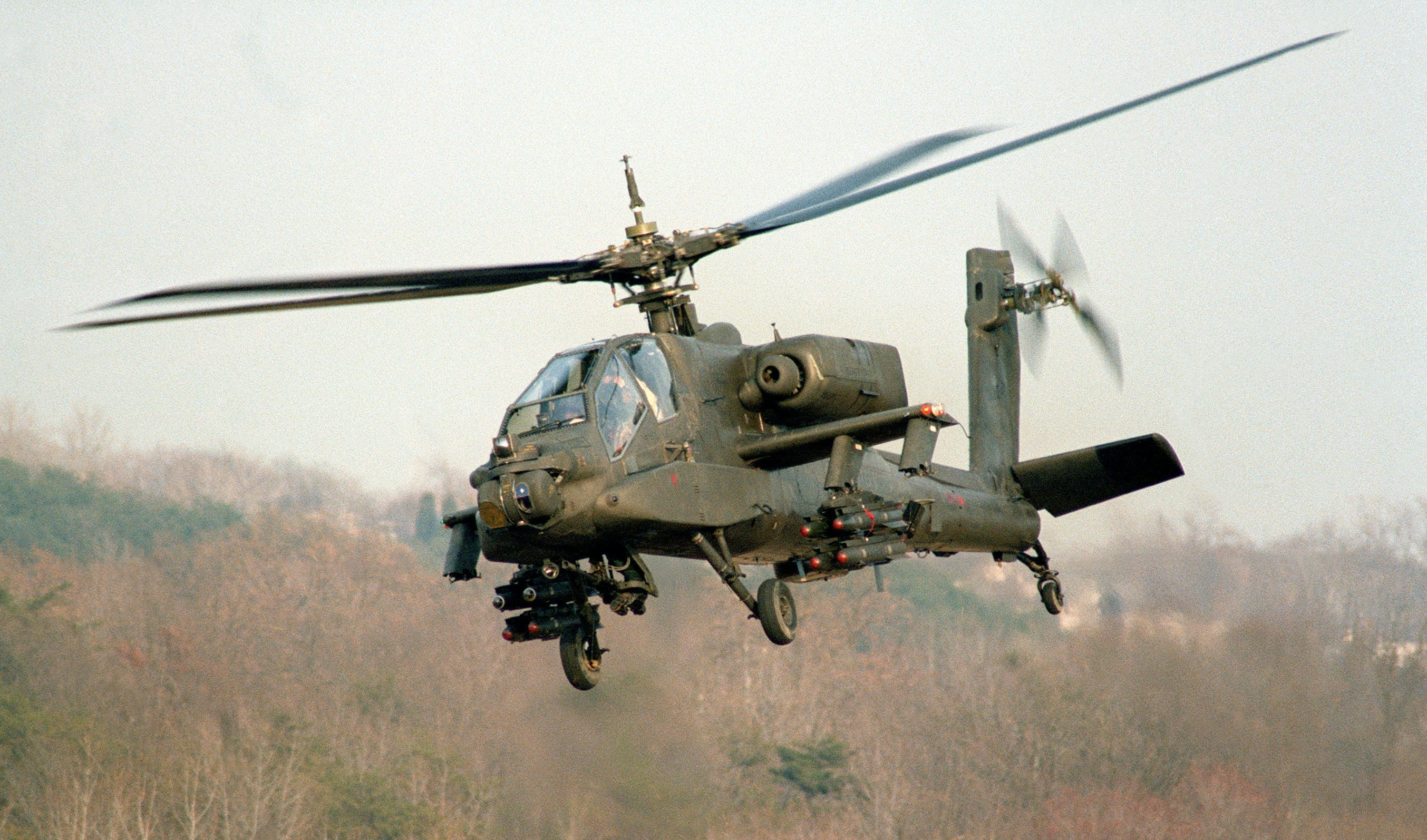
A YAH-64A on a demonstration flight

Model name	First flight	Number built	Type
Hughes XH-17	1952	1	Experimental heavy-lift helicopter
Hughes 269	1956	2,800 (Note: This includes aircraft built by McDonnell Douglas and Schweizer.)	Light utility helicopter
Hughes OH-6 Cayuse	1963	1,420 (Note: This includes aircraft built by McDonnell Douglas.)	Light observation helicopter
Hughes 500	1963	4,700	Civilian version of Hughes OH-6
Hughes XV-9	1964	1	Experimental high speed helicopter
Hughes AH-64 Apache	1975	2,400 (Note: This includes aircraft built by McDonnell Douglas and Boeing.)	Attack helicopter
Hughes 500 Defender	1976	471	Military version of Hughes 500
Hughes MH-6 Little Bird			Special operations forces version of Hughes OH-6
