= MD Helicopters =

American aerospace manufacturer

MD Helicopters, LLC.
- Type: Private
- Industry: Aerospace
- Headquarters: Mesa, Arizona, U.S.
- Products: Helicopters
- Owner: Bardin Hill Investment Partners and MBIA Insurance
- Website: www.mdhelicopters.com

MD Helicopters, LLC. (formerly McDonnell Douglas Helicopter Systems) is an American aerospace manufacturer. It produces light utility helicopters for commercial and military use. The company was a subsidiary of Hughes Aircraft until 1984, when McDonnell Douglas acquired it and renamed it McDonnell Douglas Helicopter Systems. It later became MD Helicopters in 1999 after McDonnell Douglas merged with Boeing.

== History ==
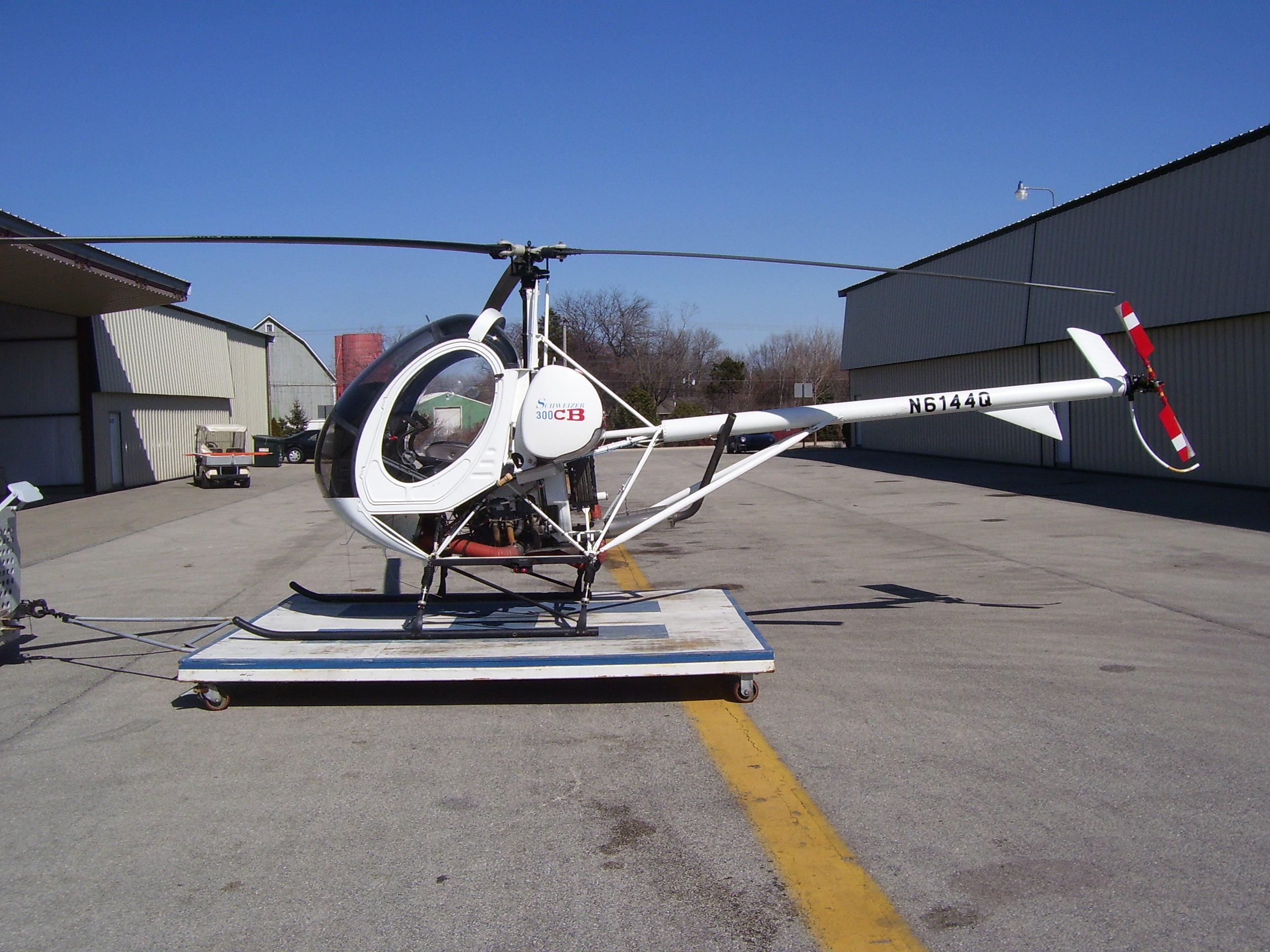
Schweizer 300CB, which began as the Hughes Model 269 in the 1950s.

The company began in 1947 as a unit of Hughes Aircraft, then was part of the Hughes Tool Company after 1955. It became the helicopter division of Hughes' Summa Corporation in 1972, and was finally reformed as Hughes Helicopters, Inc. in 1981. However, throughout its history, the company was informally known as Hughes Helicopters. The company was sold to McDonnell Douglas in 1984.

Hughes Helicopters produced three major designs during its 37-year history. The Model 269/300 was Hughes' first successful helicopter design. Built in 1956, and entering production in 1957, it would eventually become part of the Army inventory as a primary trainer, designated TH-55 Osage. In 1983, the company licensed Schweizer Aircraft to produce the Model 300C. Schweizer was eventually purchased by Sikorsky Aircraft, which is itself now a division of Lockheed Martin.

In May 1965, the company won the contract for a new observation helicopter for the U.S. Army, and produced the OH-6 Cayuse (Hughes Model 369). The OH-6 was later developed into the civilian Model 500, variants of which remain in production to this day.

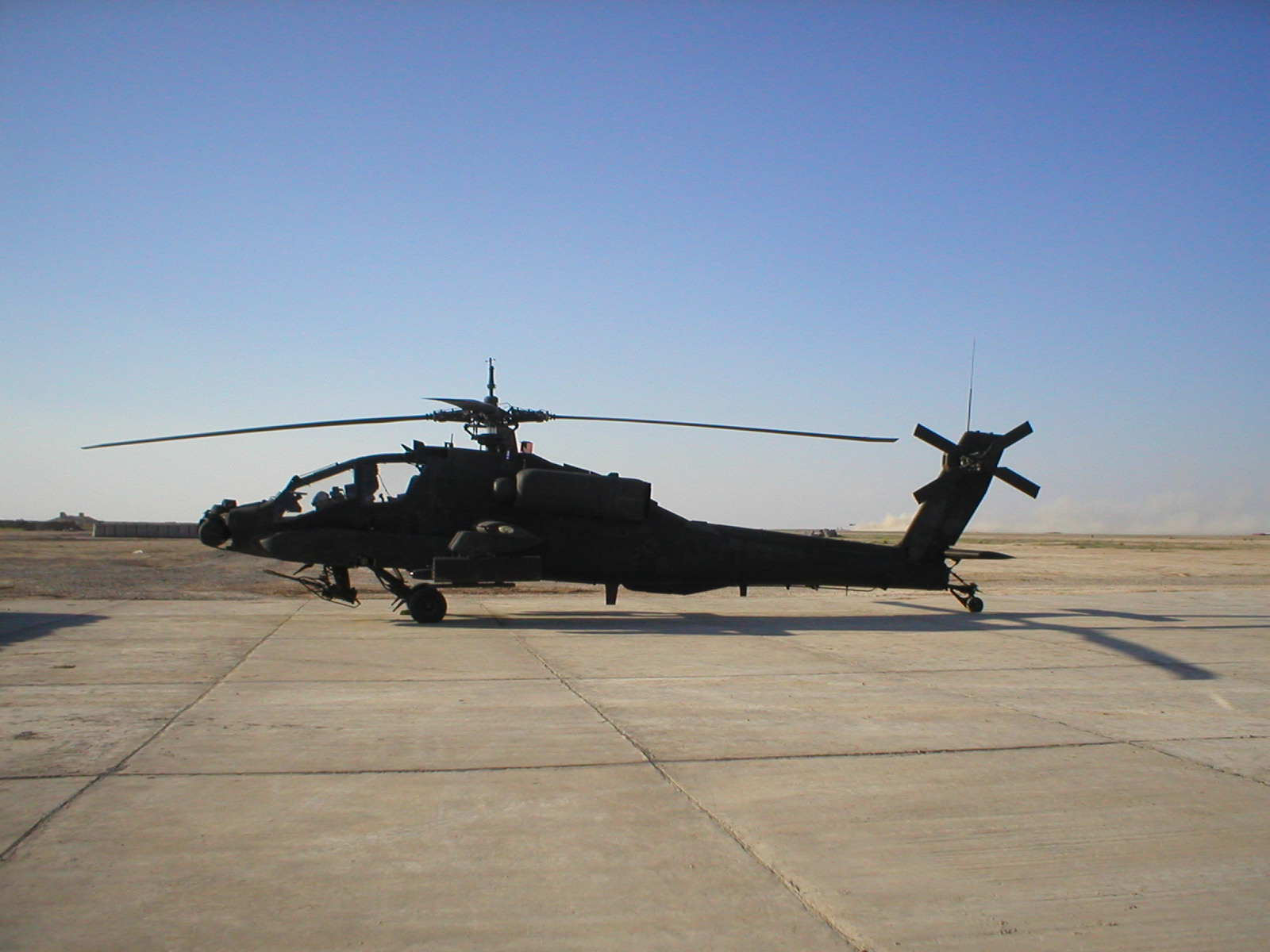
An AH-64A

In 1975, the company won the contract for the AH-64 Apache attack helicopter. By December 1981, six AH-64A prototypes had been built and the Army had awarded a production contract to the company. Production would reach more than 1,100 by 2005.

In January 1984, Hughes Helicopters, Inc. was sold to McDonnell Douglas by Summa Corporation. McDonnell Douglas paid $470 million for the company and made it a subsidiary with the name McDonnell Douglas Helicopter Systems in August 1984. In 1986, McDonnell Douglas sold all the rights to the Model 300C to Schweizer Aircraft.

On August 1, 1997, McDonnell Douglas merged into Boeing, but Boeing's subsequent plans to sell the civilian helicopter line to Bell Helicopter in 1998 were thwarted by the US Federal Trade Commission (FTC).

In 1999, Boeing completed the spin off of the civilian line of helicopters to a newly formed MD Helicopter Holdings Inc., an indirect subsidiary of the Dutch company, RDM Holding Inc. The line included the MD 500 and variants as well as the family of derivative NOTAR aircraft that originated with Hughes Helicopters Inc. Boeing maintained the AH-64 line of helicopters and rights to the NOTAR system.

After suffering dismal commercial performance, the company was purchased in 2005 by Patriarch Partners, LLC, an investment fund. The company was recapitalized as an independent company, MD Helicopters, Inc. MD Helicopters is based in Mesa, Arizona. Lynn Tilton, the Chief Executive Officer and sole principal of Patriarch Partners, was CEO of MD Helicopters until she relinquished control in March 2020 following bankruptcy court rulings related to Patriarch holdings.

By March 2022, the manufacturer filed for US Chapter 11 bankruptcy protection for restructuration, to be acquired by a creditor consortium led by Bardin Hill Investment Partners and MBIA Insurance, providing around $60 million of financing as debtors.

The new owners of MD Helicopters envision raising production to 50 helicopters a year by 2025 as the company rebuilds after exiting bankruptcy in August 2022. The plans are part of efforts by the OEM's new owners to turn around the company's fortunes after what new CEO described as the “rocky heritage” of the manufacturer under different owners since it was spun off from the merger of McDonnell Douglas and Boeing in the 1990s.

In 2023, the company closed out a long-running dispute with Aerometals over copyright and also has built closer relations with Boeing to cooperate on the AH-6 Little Bird platform, which shares a similar airframe to the MD530F.

== Products ==
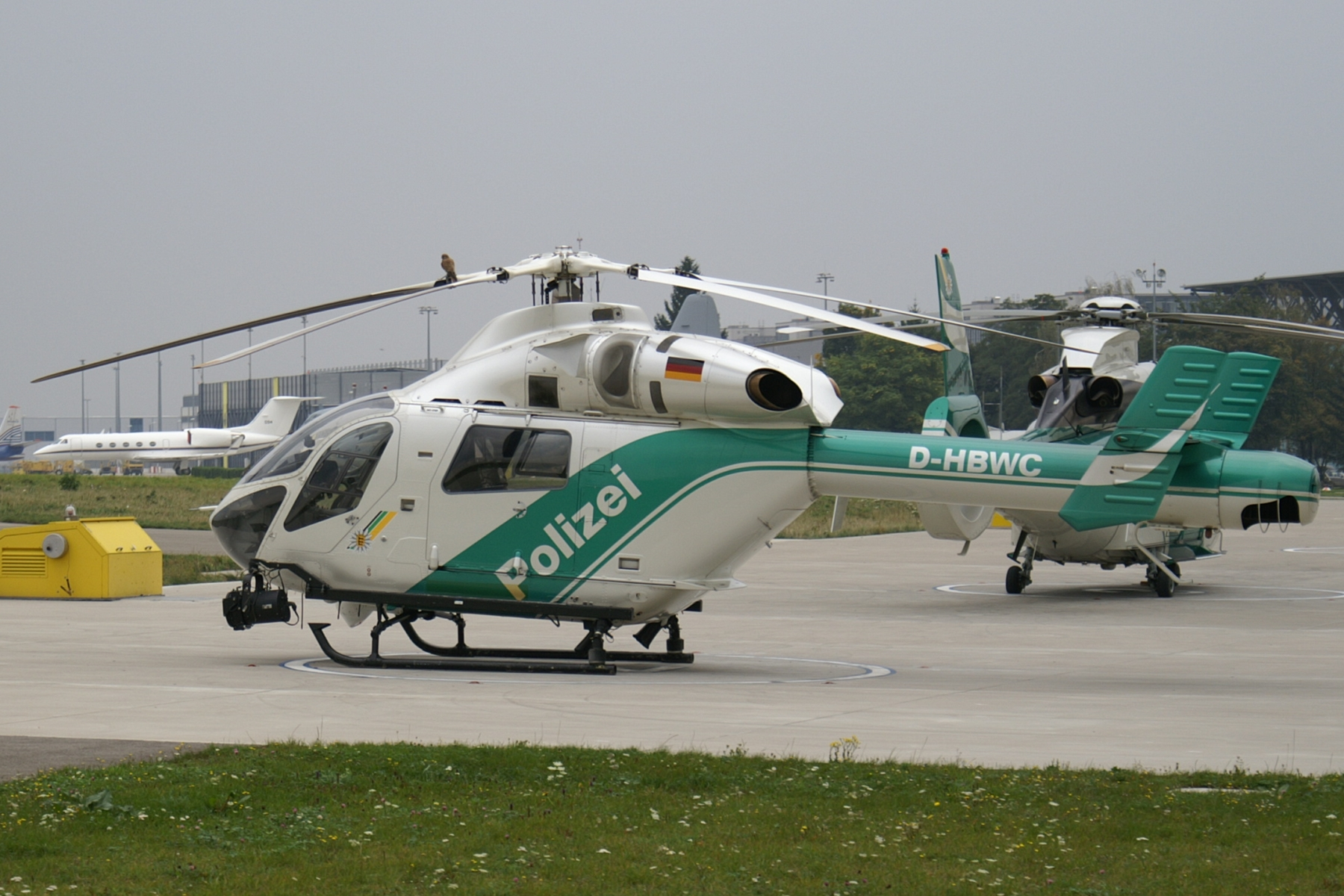
MD 902 (German police)

(Under both McDonnell Douglas and MD Helicopters)

- MD 500
  - MD 500 Defender
  - MD 530
  - MD 520 (Currently just support, production indefinitely suspended)
- MD 600 (Currently just support, production indefinitely suspended)
- MD Explorer (Currently just support, production indefinitely suspended)

(Under McDonnell Douglas only)

- AH-64 Apache – Product line transferred to Boeing Defense, Space & Security in 1998
- MH-6 Little Bird – later under Boeing Rotorcraft Systems and now as Vertical Lift division of Boeing Defense, Space & Security

In 2023, the outlook looks bleak for the restart in production of the twin-engine MD902 or further investment in the company’s No Tail Rotor (NOTAR) anti-torque system technology. CEO Brad Pedersen says the company is trying to support the MD902 “where it can,” but the production line for the aircraft has been dormant for 10 years, as has the supply chain for components. “The MD902 is a difficult discussion, and we don’t have a path forward right now,” Pedersen says.

In 2016, MD Helicopters had claimed it was making investments in the NOTAR technology, but Pedersen says there is no evidence of these efforts.

“The question is from a business standpoint, where do we spend our time focusing, and what’s the biggest bang for the buck?” Pedersen says. NOTAR, he suggests, is not a priority.

== See also ==
- Hughes Helicopters
- NOTAR

Comparable major helicopter manufacturers:

- AgustaWestland
- Airbus Helicopters
- Bell Helicopter
- Boeing Rotorcraft Systems
- Russian Helicopters
- Sikorsky Aircraft
