= MD Helicopters MD 600 =

Light utility helicopter

MD 600N
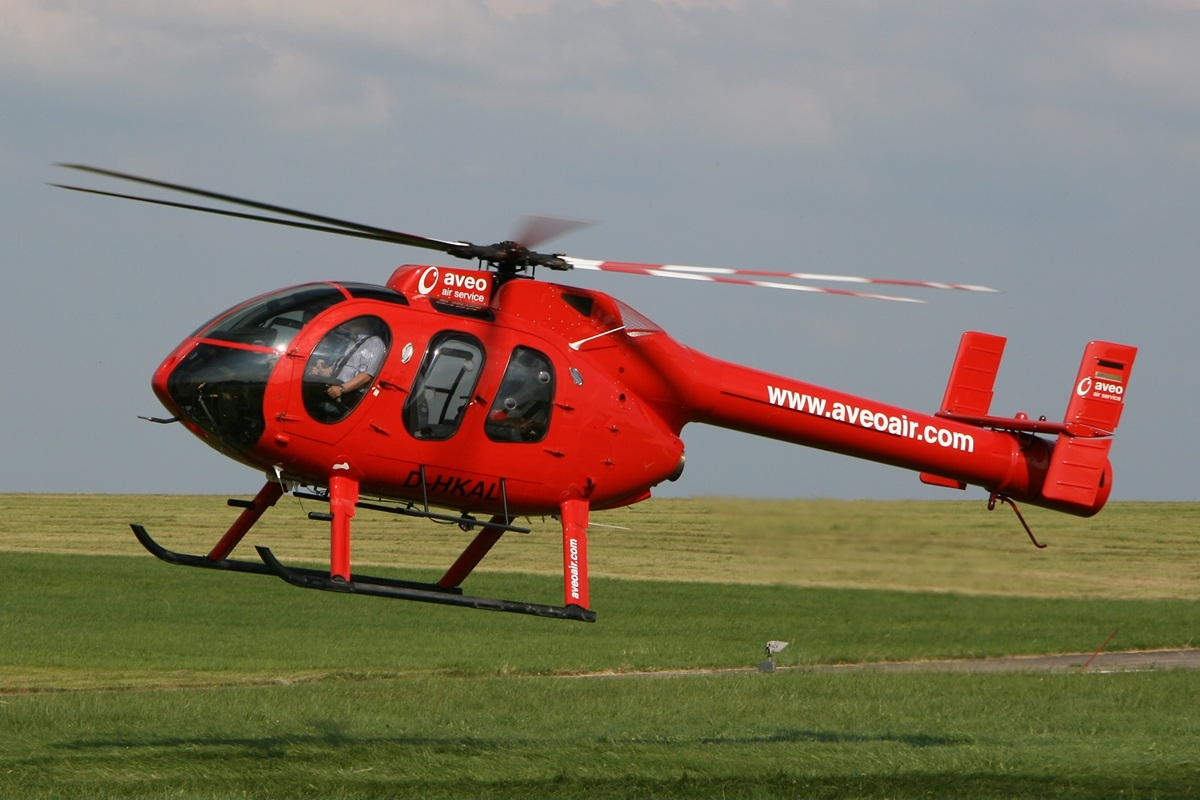
- A MD 600N with NOTAR

General information
- Type: Light utility helicopter
- National origin: United States
- Manufacturer: McDonnell Douglas Helicopter Systems; MD Helicopters
- Status: In service
- Primary user: United States Border Patrol

History
- Manufactured: 1995–present
- First flight: 22 November 1994
- Developed from: MD Helicopters MD 500

The MD Helicopters MD 600N is a light utility civilian helicopter designed in the United States. It is a stretched eight-seat development of the five-seat MD 520N helicopter.

== Design and development ==
McDonnell Douglas Helicopter Systems (MD Helicopters since 1999) first announced it was developing a stretched MD 520N in late 1994, at that time designated the MD 630N. The prototype, a modified MD 530F, had made its first flight on November 22, 1994. McDonnell Douglas gave the go-ahead for the production aircraft, redesignated the MD 600N, in March 1995.

McDonnell Douglas stretched the MD 520N fuselage by inserting a plug aft of the cockpit/cabin bulkhead and stretching the NOTAR tail boom. The larger fuselage allows for an extra (middle) row of seats. Other differences compared with the MD 520N include a new six blade main rotor (the MD 520N has a five blade unit) and an uprated Allison (now Rolls-Royce) Model 250 turboshaft.

The prototype was modified to MD 600N standard with a production standard engine and tail boom and flew in November 1995, followed the next month by the first MD 600N production prototype. Certification was awarded on May 15, 1997, and deliveries began that June.

Following the 1997 Boeing/McDonnell Douglas' merger, Boeing sold the former MD civil helicopter lines to Netherlands-based RDM Holdings in early 1999.

On March 8, 2017, MD Helicopters unveiled a concept variant known as the MD 6XX. Unlike the MD 600, the MD 6XX utilizes a traditional tail rotor and shares its T-tail design with the smaller MD 500/530F. Further development of the model has been suspended, and certification has been delayed indefinitely.

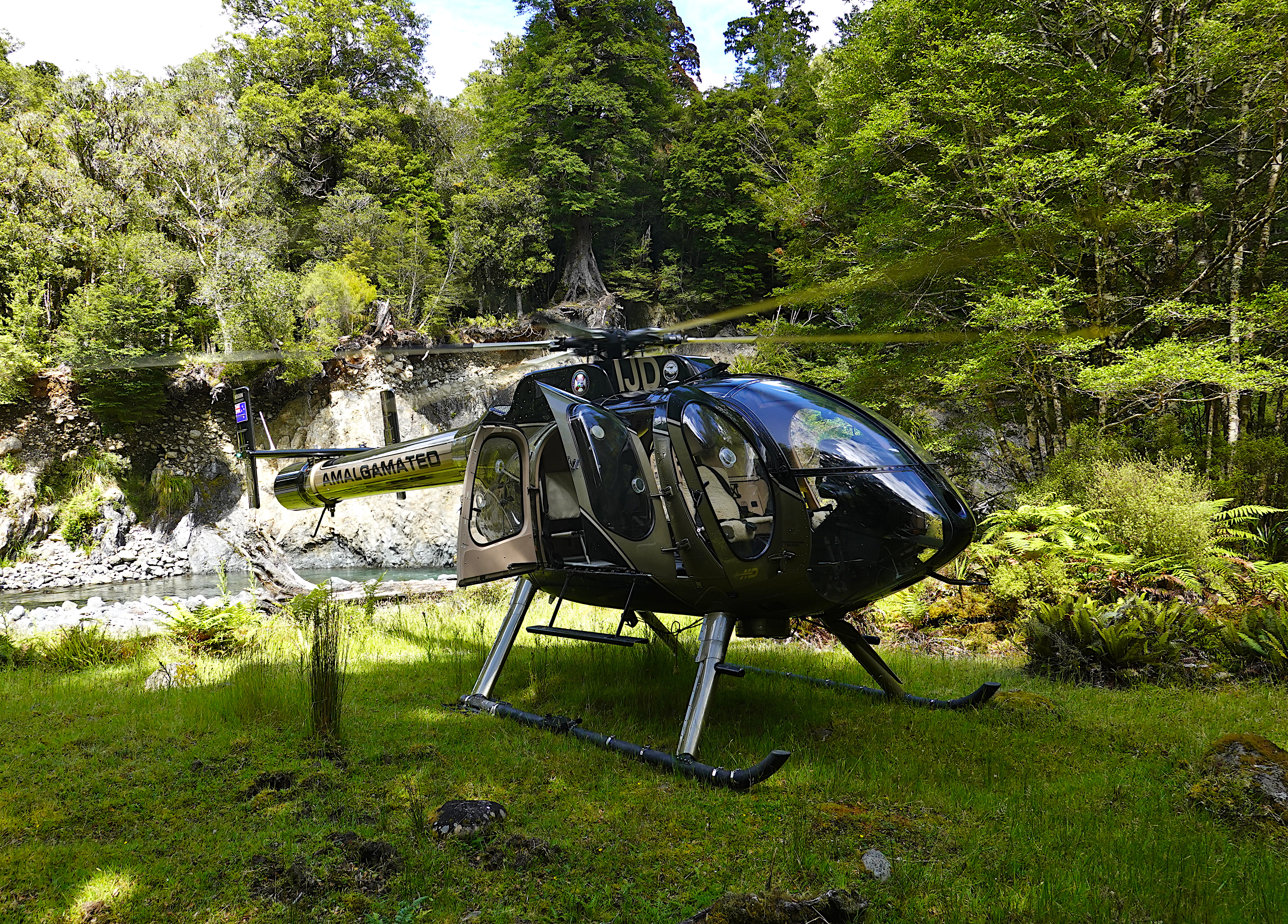
McDonald Douglas 600N helicopter on a search and rescue mission in the Tararua Ranges, New Zealand

== Operators ==
Bangladesh

- Meghna Group of Industries

Costa Rica

- Air Vigilance Service (3)

Turkey

- General Directorate of Security

United States

- United States Border Patrol (retired)

== Specifications (MD 600N) ==
Data from The International Directory of Civil Aircraft, 2003–2004

General characteristics

- Crew: 1–2
- Capacity: 8 total
- Length: 35 ft 5 in (10.80 m)
- Height: 8 ft 9 in (2.67 m)
- Empty weight: 2,100 lb (953 kg)
- Max takeoff weight: 4,100 lb (1,860 kg)
- Powerplant: 1 × Allison Model 250-C47 turboshaft engine, 600 shp (450 kW)
- Main rotor diameter: 27 ft 6 in (8.38 m)
- Main rotor area: 594.03 sq ft (55.187 m^{2})
- Blade section: - NACA 0012

Performance

- Maximum speed: 152 kn (175 mph, 282 km/h)
- Cruise speed: 135 kn (155 mph, 250 km/h)
- Range: 357 nmi (411 mi, 661 km)
- Service ceiling: 18,700 ft (5,700 m)
- Rate of climb: 2,070 ft/min (10.5 m/s)

== See also ==
Related development

- Hughes OH-6 Cayuse
- MD Helicopters MD 500

Aircraft of comparable role, configuration, and era

- AgustaWestland AW119 Koala
- Bell 407
- Eurocopter AS350 Écureuil
- Eurocopter EC130
- Marenco Swisshelicopter SKYe SH09
- PZL SW-4 Puszczyk

Related lists

- List of military aircraft of the United States
