= MD Helicopters MD 500 =

Light utility helicopter family

MD 500
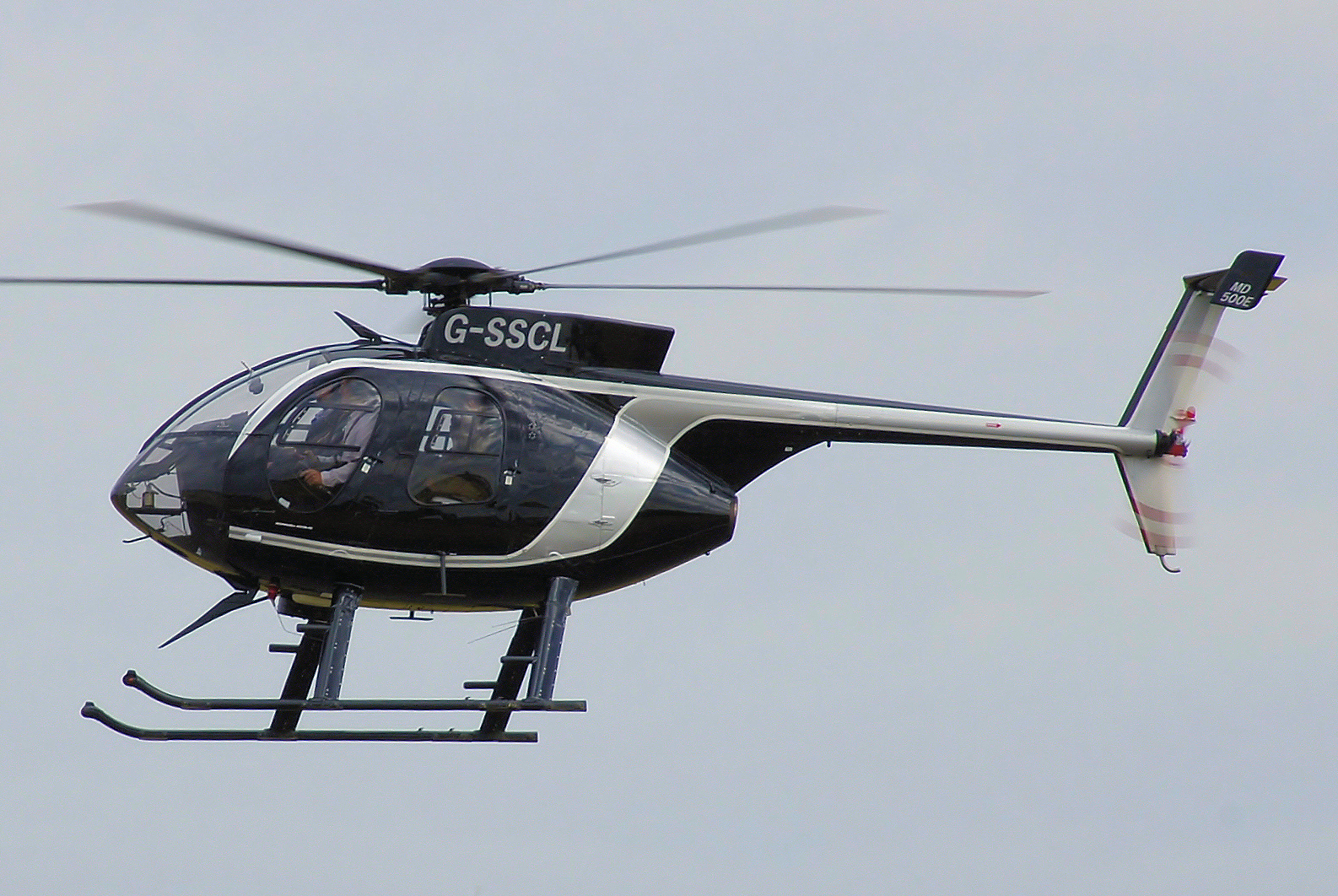
- An MD 500E

General information
- Type: Light utility helicopter
- National origin: United States
- Manufacturer: Hughes Helicopters; McDonnell Douglas Helicopter Systems; MD Helicopters
- Status: In service
- Primary user: Korean People's Air Force; Salvadoran Air Force
- Number built: 4,700

History
- Manufactured: 1967–present
- Introduction date: 1967
- First flight: 27 February 1963
- Developed from: Hughes OH-6 Cayuse
- Variants: McDonnell Douglas MD 500 Defender; Boeing AH-6
- Developed into: MD Helicopters MD 600

The MD Helicopters MD 500 series is an American family of light utility civilian and military helicopters. The MD 500 was developed from the Hughes 500, a civilian version of the US Army's OH-6A Cayuse/Loach. The series currently includes the MD 500E, MD 520N, MD 530F, and MD 530N.

The MD 500 was initially produced by Hughes Helicopters as the Hughes 500. Since being introduced in 1967, numerous models have been produced, often featuring a more powerful engine or a five-bladed main rotor in place of the original four-blade counterpart. The MD 500 has been commonly used for utility work, particularly the MD 530F; it has also proven to be popular with law enforcement agencies. Production of the type was continued into the twenty-first century by Hughes' successor companies, McDonnell Douglas Helicopter Systems, and subsequently MD Helicopters. While the MD 500 series has been largely operated by civil customers, it has occasionally seen military use, even to the extent of performing front line combat operations. The Salvadoran Air Force deployed their examples during the Salvadoran Civil War, leading to several losses. North Korea also covertly obtained a fleet of MD500s for military purposes, some of which have been allegedly configured into gunships.

== Design and development ==
=== Background ===
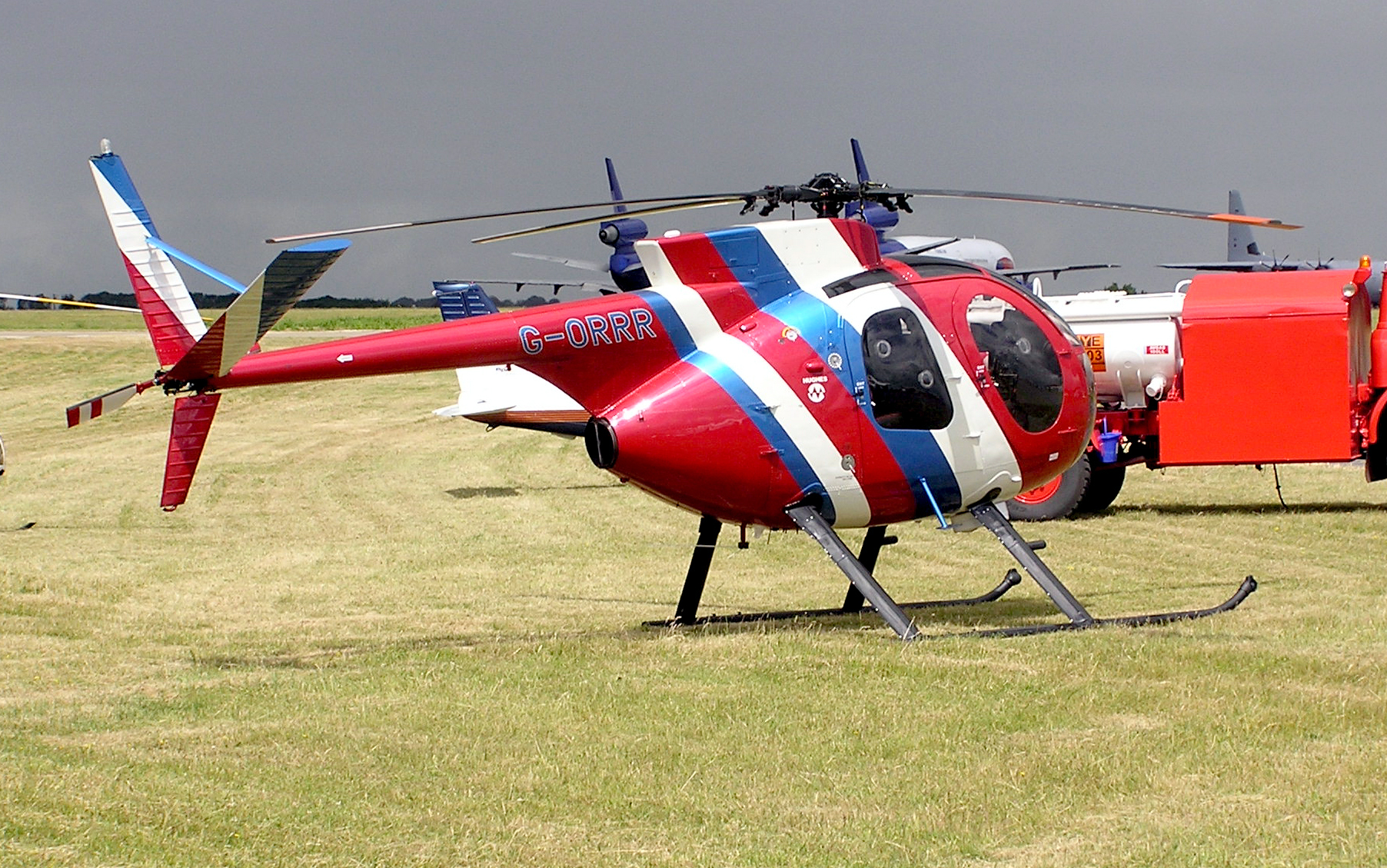
A Hughes 500C (Model 369HS)

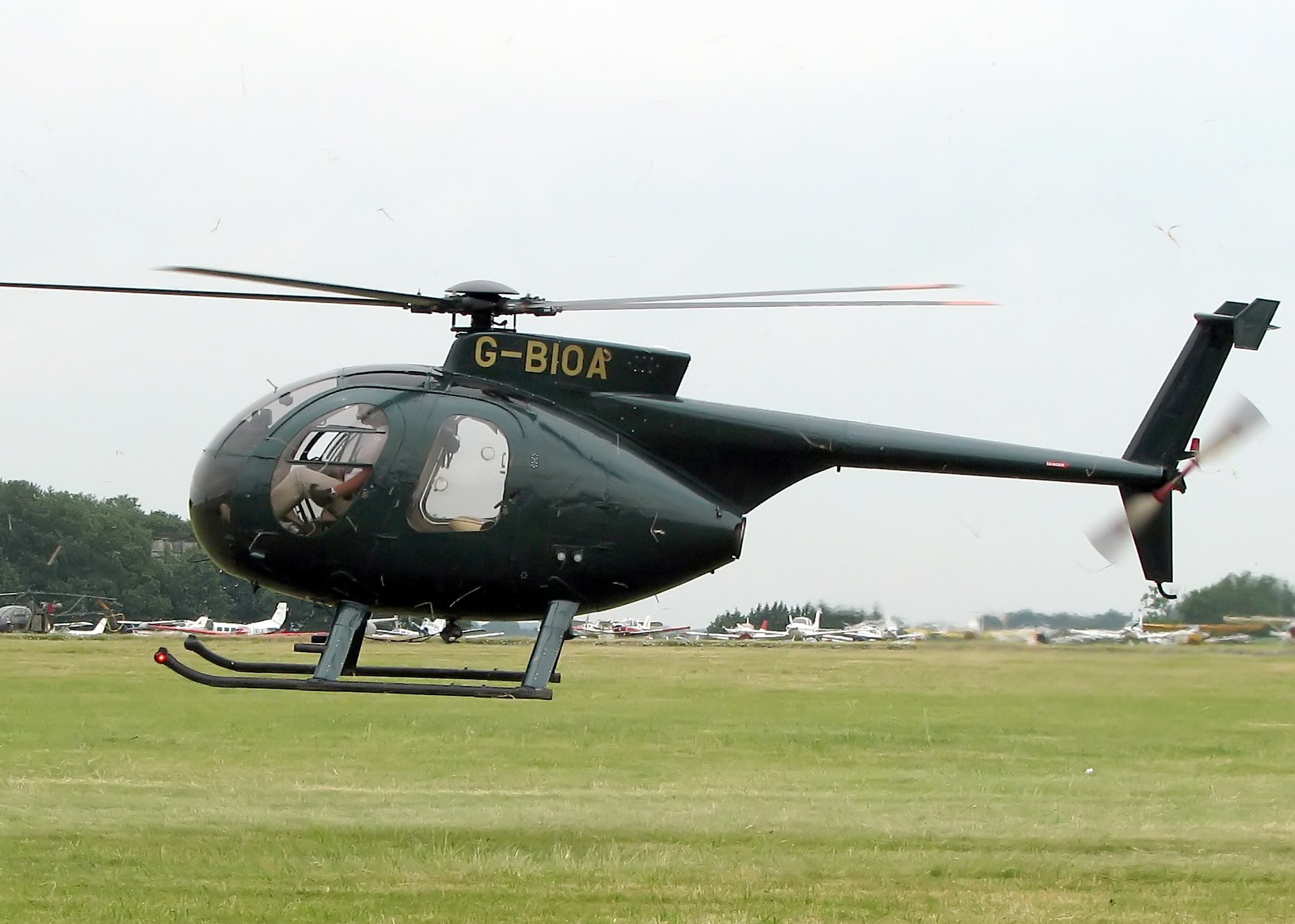
A Hughes 500D

The Hughes 500/MD 500 series can be traced back to the early 1960s and the issuing of a requirement for a Light Observation Helicopter (LOH) for the United States Army. Following a competitive tendering process, Hughes' Model 369 was selected as the winning bid, triumphing over rival submission from the helicopter manufacturers Bell and Hiller. On 27 February 1963, under the service designation of OH-6 Cayuse, the maiden flight of the type was performed.

The MD 500 series features shock-absorbing landing skid struts, a turboshaft engine mounted at a 45-degree angle toward the rear of the cabin pod, a fuel tank cell under the floor and the battery in the nose. The engine exhaust port is located at the end of the cabin pod underneath the tailboom. It has a short-diameter main rotor system and a short tail, which gives it an agile control response and also makes it less susceptible to weather-cocking. It had a distinctive atypical teardrop-shaped fuselage, a feature that sometimes led to personnel referring to it as the "flying egg".

Hughes had allegedly succeeded in the LOH contest with its OH-6 helicopter by submitting a very low and aggressive price per airframe (without an engine), to the point where the company allegedly lost money . Due to price escalations for both the OH-6 and spare components, the U.S. Army opted to reopen bids for the programme in 1967. Seeking to profitably produce the type, Hughes offered the machine at a more realistic unit price of $56,550, however, this bid was undercut by the redesigned Bell OH-58 Kiowa, a militarised version of the JetRanger series. Despite this, some OH-6 helicopters were still ordered by the U.S. Army, though at a much reduced number.

=== Hughes/MD 500 ===
Even prior to the first flight of the OH-6, Hughes had announced that it was working on a civilian version of the rotorcraft, which would be marketed as the Hughes 500. It was available in basic five- and seven-seat configurations. A utility version with a more powerful engine was offered as the 500U (later called the 500C).

During 1976, the improved Hughes 500D became the primary model. It was outfitted with a more powerful engine, a T-tail, and a new five-blade main rotor; furthermore, a four-blade tail rotor could be optionally installed. The 500D was replaced by the 500E from 1982 with a pointed nose and various interior improvements, such as greater head- and legroom. The 530F was a more powerful version of the 500E optimized for hot and high work, being furnished with an enlarged main rotor and more powerful Allison 250-C30 engine, capable of producing up to 425 hp.

During January 1984, Hughes Helicopters, the original manufacturer of the 500 series, was acquired by the American aircraft manufacturer McDonnell Douglas. Accordingly, starting in August 1985, the 500E and 530F were rebranded as the MD 500E and MD 530F Lifter respectively. Following the merger between Boeing and McDonnell Douglas, the division was briefly owned by the new entity; Boeing opted to quickly sell the former MD civil helicopter lines to the newly created MD Helicopters in early 1999. Military variants are marketed under the MD 500 Defender name.

=== MD 520N ===
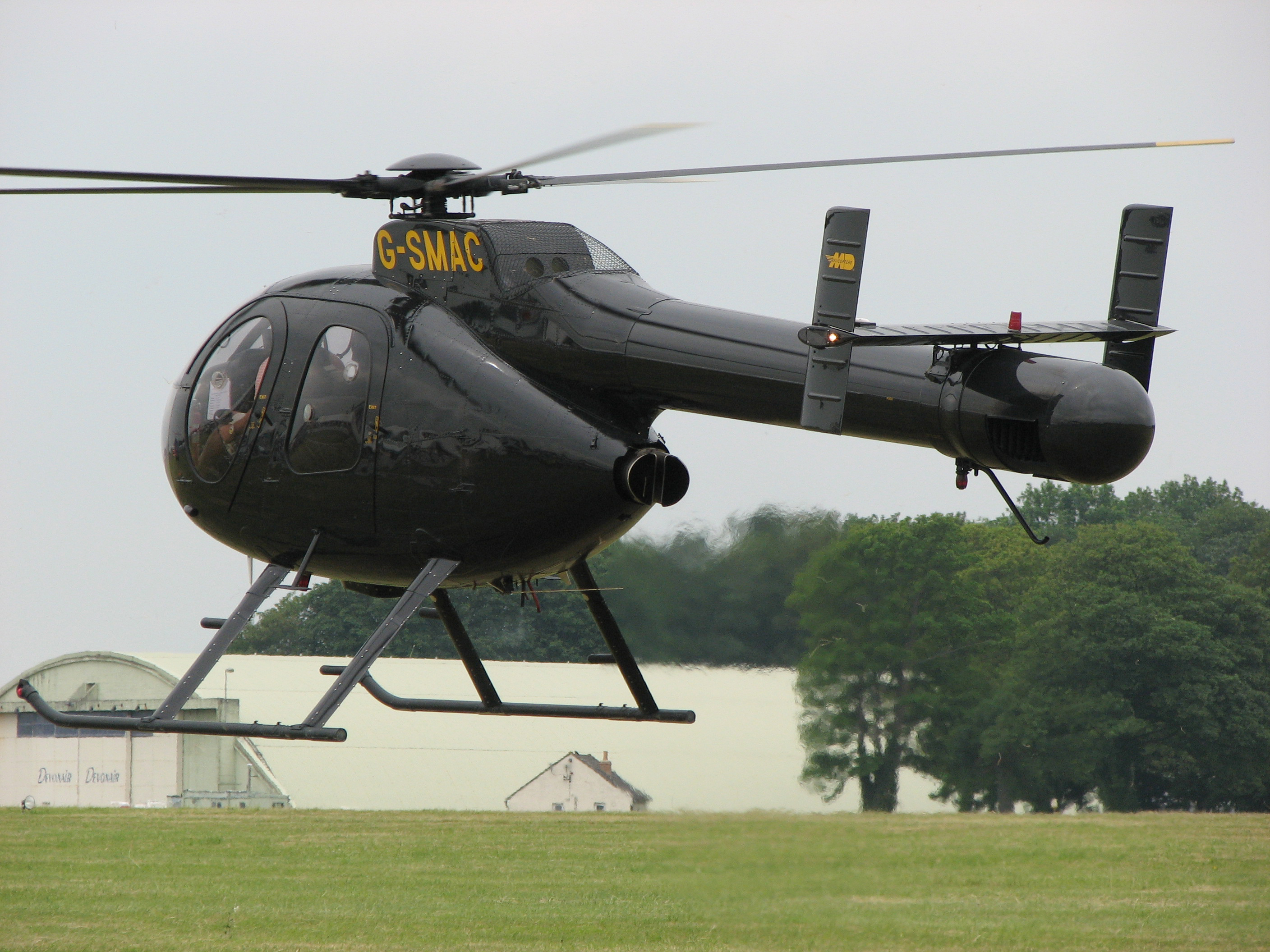
A NOTAR MD 520N

The MD 520N introduced a revolutionary change in helicopter design, dispensing with a conventional anti-torque tail rotor in favor of the Hughes/McDonnell-Douglas-developed NOTAR system. Exhaust from a fan is directed through slots in the tailboom, using the Coandă effect to counteract the torque of the main rotor, and a controllable thruster at the end of the tailboom is used for yaw control. Because the fan is enclosed in the tailboom, tail rotor noise—the major source of noise from most conventional helicopters—was significantly reduced. It also eliminated the vulnerable exposed tail rotor blades, eliminating the possibility of persons being injured or killed on the ground and the cause for many confined area maneuvering accidents.

McDonnell Douglas originally intended to develop the standard MD 520N alongside the more powerful hot-and-high optimized MD 530N; both were launched in January 1989 and were based on the conventional MD 500E. The MD 530N was the first to fly, on December 29, 1989, and the MD 520N first flew on May 1, 1990. Development of the MD 530N was suspended when McDonnell Douglas decided that the MD 520N met most customer requirements for the 530N. Certification for the MD 520N was awarded on September 13, 1991, and the first was delivered on December 31 that year.

In 2000, MD Helicopters announced enhancements to the MD 520N, including an improved Rolls-Royce 250-C20R+ engine with 3% to 5% more power for better performance on warm days, and changes to the diffuser and fan rigging, also increased range.

== Operational history ==
=== Civilian ===
The MD 500 series had proven to be popular with civilian operators, with which the type has seen use for a diverse range of purposes. According to Flying magazine, it has been particularly popular in circumstances where the primary passenger and pilot are both in the front seats, as can be typical in aerial observation, utility, and law enforcement work. While a minority have been used for executive transportation (typically modified to provide rear seating), it is more common to see it used as a private/personal helicopter.

While numerous operators have opted to procure MD 500s with the newer Rolls-Royce 250-C20 engine, which provides greater reliability and power output than older counterparts, some operators have reportedly chosen to remove these engines and substitute them with Vietnam-era surplus engines which are available even into the twenty-first century at a considerably lower purchase cost.

=== El Salvador ===
At the start of the Salvadoran Civil War, the Salvadoran Air Force operated a total of six MD 500D helicopters purchased from civilian sources. Amid the conflict, these were supplemented by a further nine MD 500Es that were supplied by the United States in 1984. The type was typically operated in the gunship role, having been armed with both XM27 7.62 mm Minigun subsystems and unguided 70mm rocket pods; additional mission roles included aerial reconnaissance and liaison duties. By the end of the conflict, only two MD 500D and seven MD 500Es were reportedly in an operational condition. By 2012 Salvadoran Air Force received three brand new MD 500Es from MD Helicopters to be used for the United Nations mission in Mali, Africa. In 2022 the United States donated four MD 530Fs which were previously owned by the Department Of State Air Wing (DOSAW) which will also be used for United Nations missions. The Salvadoran Air Force as of 2023 currently operates six MD 500Es and four MD 530Fs.

=== North Korea ===
During the 1980s, North Korea managed to circumvent US export restrictions and covertly purchase a total of 87 civilian-type Hughes MD 500s through a legitimate West German export firm before the US government learned of the illegal action by North Korea and acted to prevent any further deliveries to the country. Once they had arrived in North Korea, efforts continued to be made to conceal their existence, and are believed to have been flown only sparingly at least for a large portion of their service life. There have been allegations that at least sixty of the helicopters delivered to North Korea have been modified to serve as helicopter gunships. As South Korea produces the MD 500 domestically (under license) for use by its own armed forces, the modified helicopters operated by North Korea were deemed useful in conducting covert or deceptive operations against South Korea (such as incursions past the border).

The modified MD 500 helicopters were finally revealed by North Korea in an obviously visible manner, even to international observers, during the country’s annual Victory Parade held in Pyongyang on 27 July 2013, which commemorated the 60th anniversary of the end of the Korean War in 1953. According to analysts, it is visible that the North Korea's fleet of MD 500s have been modified significantly so that they can function as light attack helicopters. Amongst these changes was mounting points and interfacing apparatus to allow them to fire Soviet-designed AT-3 Sagger anti-tank wire-guided missiles.

== Variants ==
369
Military prototype designated YOH-6A.
369A
Military production designated OH-6.
MD 500C (369H)
Improved five-seat commercial variant powered by an Allison 250-C18B rated at 317 shp (236 kW); certified in 1966.
Kawasaki-Hughes 369HS
Built under license by Kawasaki Heavy Industries in Japan alongside OH-6J.
MD 500M Defender (369HM)
Military export version as the MD 500 Defender; certified in 1968.
MD 500C (369HS)
Improved four-seat commercial variant by an Allison 250-C20 rated at 400 shp (298 kW); certified in 1969.
MD 500C (369HE)
A 369HS with higher standard interior fittings, certified in 1969.
MD 500D (369D)
New commercial version from 1976 powered by an Allison 250-C20B rated at 420 shp (313 kW); certified in 1976.
MD 500E (369E)
Executive version of the 500D with recontoured nose; certified in 1982.
NH-500E
Italian-built version of the 500E. License-produced by Breda Nardi before merging with Agusta.
MD 520N
NOTAR (NO TAil Rotor) version of the 500E, certified in 1991. Powered by Rolls-Royce (formerly Allison) 250-C20R/2 rated at 450 shp.
MD 530F (369F)
Hot and high version of the 500E powered by a Rolls-Royce (formerly Allison) 250-C30HU rated at 650 shp (485 kW), certified in 1984.
MD 530N
NOTAR (NO TAil Rotor) Version of the 530F. Employs the Rolls-Royce 250-C30HU from the 530F for Hot and High flight.
MD 564
Modernized variant featuring a six-blade main rotor, four-blade tail rotor, and Rolls-Royce 250-C47E/3 turboshaft engine with dual-channel FADEC.

Unmanned Little Bird Demonstrator and AH-6
A civilian 530F modified by Boeing Rotorcraft Systems to develop UAV technologies for both civilian and military applications.

=== Military ===
For military variants, see McDonnell Douglas MD 500 Defender and Hughes OH-6 Cayuse.

== Operators ==
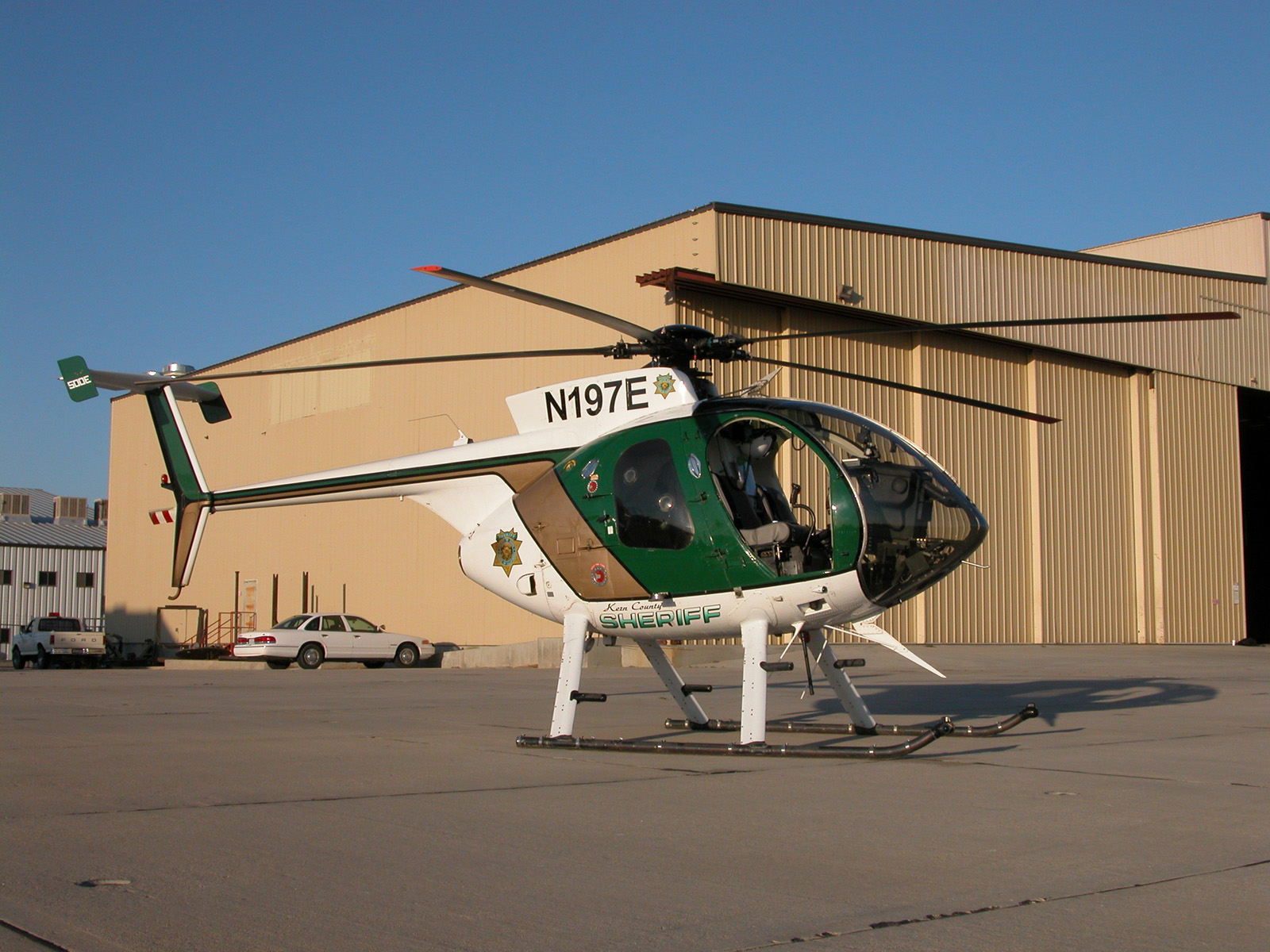
Kern County Sheriff's MD 500E

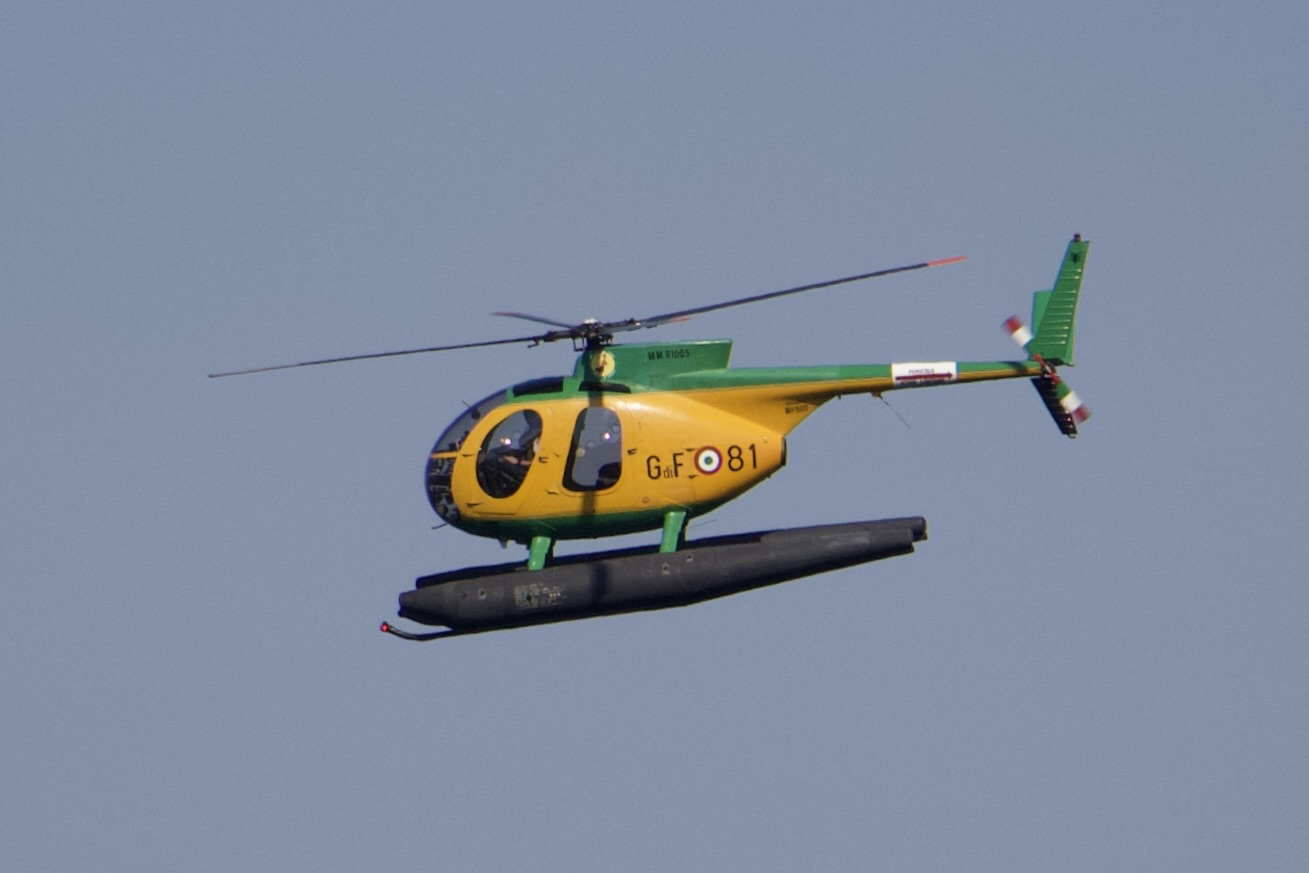
Guardia di Finanza NH-500 helicopter in flight.

The MD 500 is widely operated by private individuals, companies and law enforcement agencies around the world.

Belgium

- Federal Police

Colombia

- National Police of Colombia

Costa Rica

- Air Vigilance Service

Ecuador

- National Police of Ecuador

El Salvador

- Salvadoran Air Force

Finland

- Utti Jaeger Regiment

Honduras

- Honduran Air Force

Hungary

- Hungarian Police

Indonesia

- Pelita Air
- Indonesian Air Force - 12 ex-Pelita Air Hughes 500C were given to the Air Force in 1982. Retired from service.

Iraq

- Iraqi Kurdistan
  - Kurdistan Region Police

Italy

- Guardia di Finanza
- State Forestry Corps

Philippines

- Philippine Air Force - 1 unit MD-500E trainer, transferred from Department of Public Works and Highways.

Kenya

- Kenya Army

North Korea

- Korean People's Air Force - Total 87 were smuggled into North Korea in contravention of international sanctions.

United States

- Academi
- Cleetus McFarland
- Cleveland Division of Police
- Columbus Division of Police
- Fresno County Sheriff's Department
- Glendale Police Department
- Hawaii County Fire Department
- Houston Police Department
- Huntington Beach Police Department
- Kansas City Police Department
- Las Vegas Metropolitan Police Department
- Metro Nashville Police Department
- Oakland Police Department
- Pasadena Police Department
- Prince George's County Police Department - Has operated the MD520N since at least June 2000, equipped with FLIR, with a third one added in 2017 for a total of 4.
- Riverside Police Department
- San Diego County Sheriff's Office
- St. Louis Metropolitan Police Department
- St. Louis County Police Department
- Tennessee Valley Authority
- Virginia Beach Police Department

== Specifications ==
=== MD 530F ===

Data from MD500E Performance Specifications, The International Directory of Civil Aircraft

General characteristics

- Crew: 2
- Capacity: 3 passengers
- Length: 32 ft 7 in (9.93 m)
- Height: 8 ft 9 in (2.67 m)
- Empty weight: 1,591 lb (722 kg)
- Max takeoff weight: 3,550 lb (1,610 kg)
- Powerplant: 1 × Allison 250-C30 turboshaft engine, 650 shp (480 kW)
- Main rotor diameter: 27 ft 4 in (8.33 m)
- Main rotor area: 587.5 sq ft (54.58 m^{2}) * Blade section: - NACA 0012

Performance

- Maximum speed: 152 kn (175 mph, 282 km/h)
- Cruise speed: 135 kn (155 mph, 250 km/h)
- Range: 223 nmi (257 mi, 413 km)
- Service ceiling: 18,700 ft (5,700 m)
- Rate of climb: 2,070 ft/min (10.5 m/s)

=== MD 500C ===

Data from

General characteristics

- Crew: 2
- Capacity: 2
- Length: 30 ft 3.75 in (9.2393 m)
- Height: 8 ft 1.5 in (2.477 m)
- Empty weight: 1,229 lb (557 kg)
- Max takeoff weight: 2,700 lb (1,225 kg)
- Fuel capacity: 61.5 US gal (51 imp gal; 233 L) in two 50% self-sealing bladder tanks under rear cabin floor
- Powerplant: 1 × Allison T63-A-5A turboshaft engine, 317 shp (236 kW)
- Main rotor diameter: 26 ft 4 in (8.03 m)
- Main rotor area: 544.63 sq ft (50.598 m^{2}) * Blade section: - NACA 0012

Performance

- Maximum speed: 130 kn (150 mph, 240 km/h)
- Cruise speed: 130 kn (150 mph, 240 km/h)
- Range: 330 nmi (380 mi, 610 km) at 5,000 ft (1,524 m)
- Ferry range: 1,354 nmi (1,558 mi, 2,508 km) with 1,300 lb (590 kg) of fuel
- Service ceiling: 15,800 ft (4,800 m) * Hover ceiling OGE: 7,300 ft (2,225 m)
- Hover ceiling IGE: 11,800 ft (3,597 m)
- Rate of climb: 2,070 ft/min (10.5 m/s)

== See also ==
- Aircraft in fiction § Hughes 500 / OH-6 / MH-6 / MD 500

Related development

- Boeing AH-6
- Hughes OH-6 Cayuse
- McDonnell Douglas MD 500 Defender
- MD Helicopters MD 600

Aircraft of comparable role, configuration, and era

- Bell 206 – (United States, Canada)
- Bell 407 – (United States, Canada)
- Aérospatiale Gazelle – (France)
- Eurocopter EC120 Colibri – (France, China, Singapore)
- HAL Dhruv – (India)
- PZL SW-4 – (Poland)
- Robinson R66 – (United States)

Related lists

- List of military aircraft of the United States
