= Kopter AW09 =

Swiss light helicopter

Leonardo AW09
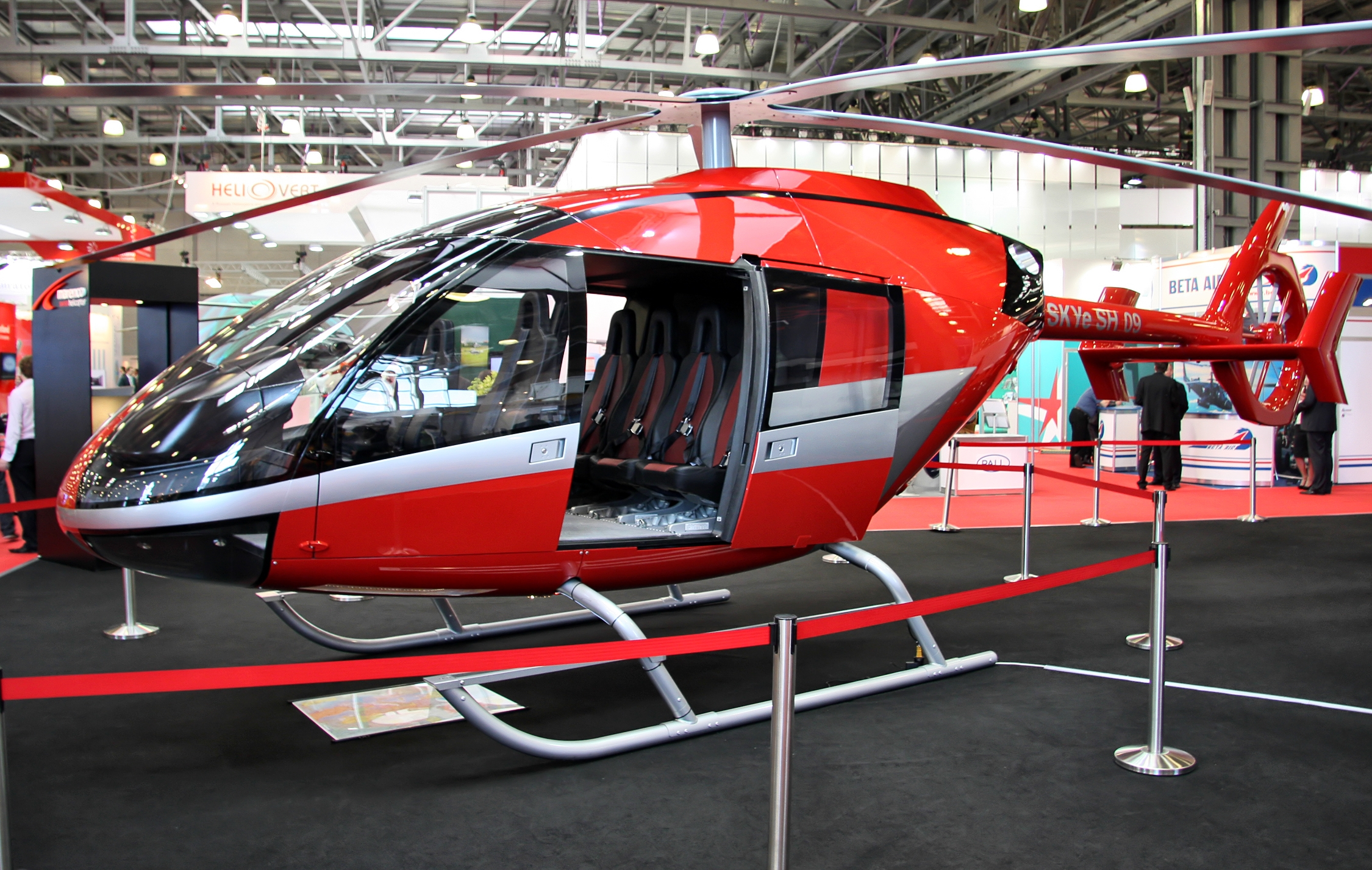

General information
- Type: Helicopter
- National origin: Switzerland
- Manufacturer: Kopter
- Designer: Martin Stucki
- Status: Under development
- Number built: 3

History
- First flight: 2 October 2014

The Kopter AW09, rebranded in Leonardo AW09, (formerly the Marenco Swisshelicopter SKYe SH09 and Kopter SH09) is the Leonardo small civil helicopter division's five-to-eight seat, single-engine multirole helicopter which is currently under development at Kopter’s facilities. It is marketed as a clean-sheet design amongst a market sector dominated by decades-old airframe designs.

The first prototype P1 first flew on 2 October 2014. P2 in February 2016, P3 during November 2018. There have been ongoing delays in first flight of prototypes and TC/commercial deliveries deadlines.

On 8 April 2020, Italian manufacturer Leonardo announced the closing of the acquisition of Kopter Group AG (Kopter) from Lynwood (Schweiz). The purchase price consists of $185 million, plus earn out. At the time Kopter employed 320 people.

On 21 April 2021 Leonardo rebranded the SH09 single-engine helicopter as the AW09.

== Development ==
=== History ===
In 2002, Martin Stucki, a mechanical engineer and commercial helicopter pilot, initiated design work on a design that led to the SH09. Frustrated by legacy designs and typically unsuited cockpits, Stucki had observed that the light single-engine helicopter market had not seen any all-new designs in decades, and he conducted market research that indicated a viable demand for a new rotorcraft in the 2.5-tonne class. In 2007 he formed Marenco Swisshelicopter (Marenco - from Martin Engineering and Consulting) to develop the rotorcraft.

The SH09 adopted several modern features. Its airframe is entirely composed of carbon composite materials; it employs a shrouded fenestron tail rotor and a high-visibility cockpit. The carbon composite construction allowed a relatively low empty weight. According to Mathias Senes, Marenco's chief commercial officer: "There’s no other material today that brings the benefits of rigidity, strength, and light weight". Stucki approached his design from a pilot's perspective, attempting to improve ergonomics, comfort, and operator requirements. It possesses excellent hot and high performance, lengthy flight endurance, a low noise signature, and has relatively smooth handling.

By 2009, sufficient financing had been secured from investors, which allowed for the SH09 to be formally launched that year; accordingly, the helicopter was given the designation SKYe SH09 in reference to the year that development on the project officially commenced. A small number of staff worked on the project, initially being a team of nine; an emphasis was made on recruiting very high quality engineers, including from other rotorcraft manufacturers such as Airbus Helicopters; the company had over 100 employees in 2016. Company operations in Switzerland have been split between the towns of Pfäffikon, where design work is centered, and Mollis, where assembly and flight testing operations are conducted; a third facility in Germany handles compliance verification.

A pre-production prototype of the SH09 was displayed at Heli-Expo 2011 in Orlando, Florida, marking its public introduction. At that time, Marenco stated that it planned to make first deliveries in 2015, and that it would produce as many as 15 SH09s within the first year as well as potentially rising to 30 rotorcraft in the following year. It was also stated that, while the Honeywell HTS900 turboshaft engine had been selected as the initial powerplant for the SH09, it was hoped that customers would soon be offered a choice in engines.

In May 2016 a company representative indicated that Marenco was pursuing the development of a twin-engine version of the design. In late 2016, Stucki stated that some flexibility to allow for the future adaption of the SH09 to become a twin-engine helicopter had already been incorporated into the base design, and indicated that a twin-engine variant was a straightforward progression.

In January 2018 the company was rebranded as Kopter, with the helicopter name changed to SH09 (dropping the SKY-e).

In February 2018, Kopter was seeking to raise CHF 150 million to carry it through certification to production in the second half of 2019, adding to the CHF 270 million already spent since 2007 by the Russian Mamut foundation.

=== Prototypes ===
The flight test program will use three prototypes (P1, P2 & P3) and two Pre-Series Aircraft 4 and 5 (PS4 & PS5). PS4 & PS5 will jointly serve for the certification flights. P1 was used to complete the first phase of the flight test program, proving the handling and attitude of the aircraft, and expanding the flight envelope, including autorotation tests and being flown to 97 per cent of its maximum internal load takeoff weight. P2 and P3 are the main vehicles for airworthiness certification testing; they are more representative of production aircraft, their design incorporating several refinements. The company plans to first certify SH09 with EASA, then rapidly seek certification in the United States.

==== P1 ====
In March 2011, Marenco planned P1's first flight for early 2012, During December 2013, the completed P1 was revealed to the public. but it actually first flew on 2 October 2014. The first flight lasted 20 minutes and was flown by chief test pilot Dwayne Williams. At that time the company projected receiving EASA certification within 12-16 months. In summer 2015, Marenco halted flight tests after 100 flight hours to focus on producing the second prototype, which incorporated a modified bearingless rotor head and new rotor blades to reduce vibrations. By September 2015, it was recognised that the original development timeline had been optimistic. The completion of P1 was reportedly delayed by as much as six months due to the late delivery of its engine by Honeywell.

==== P2 ====
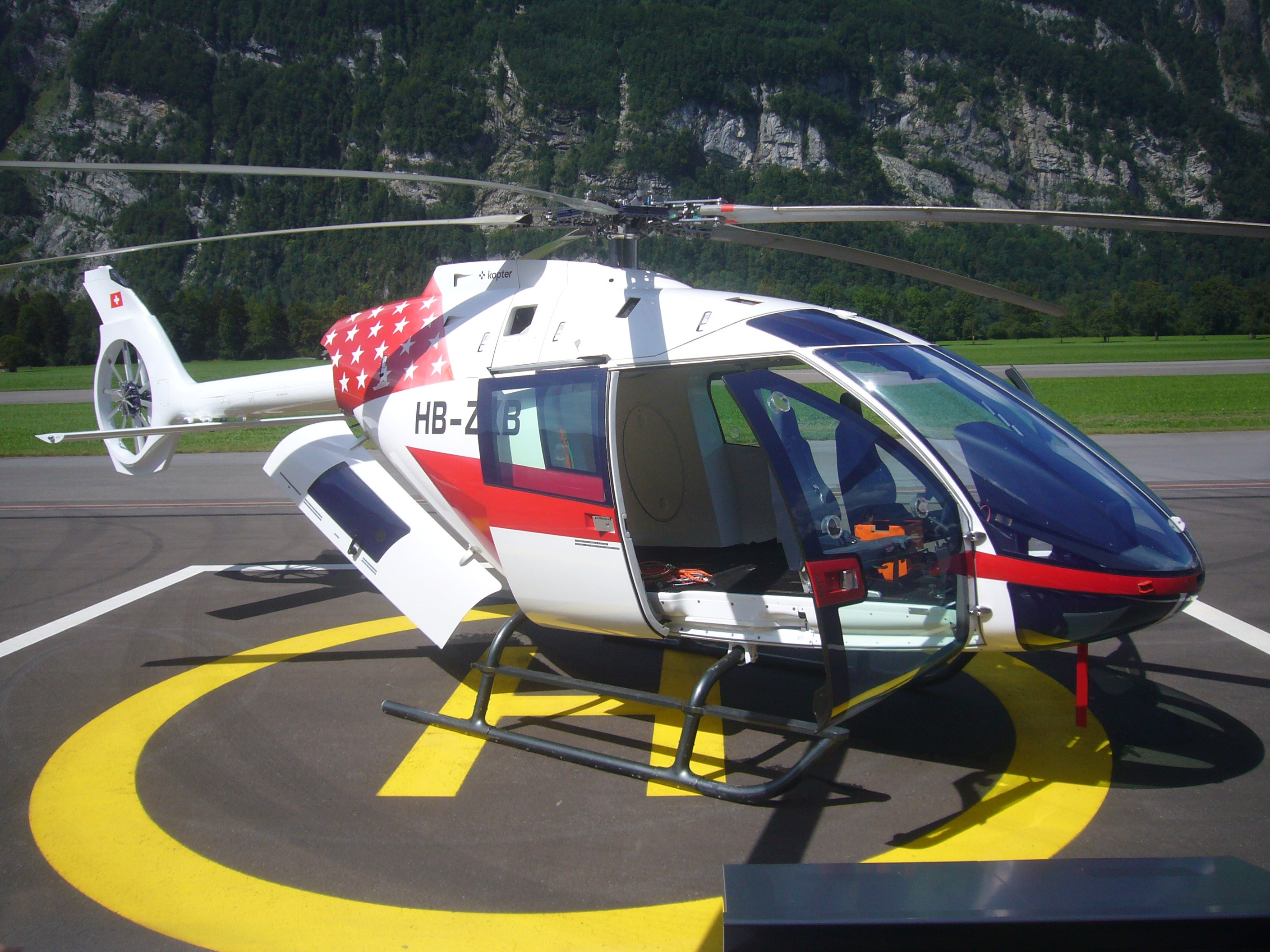
HB-ZXB then Marenco Swisshelicopter

On 26 February 2016, P2 performed its first flight, piloted by new chief test pilot Richard Trueman. At this point, certification was expected to be achieved near to the end of 2016 or during early 2017.

==== P3 ====
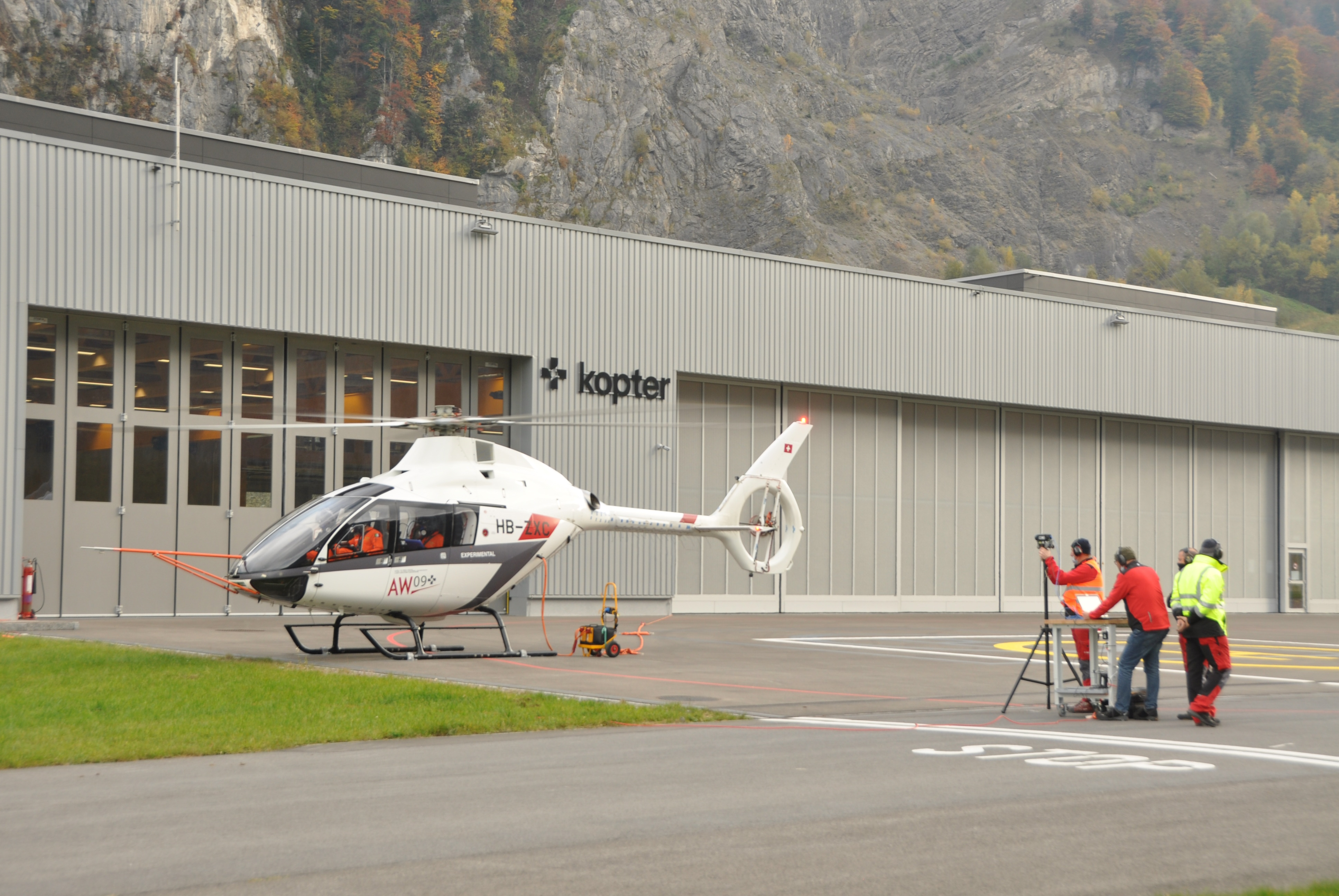
Kopter HB-ZXC in 2021 during a tethered test run

In May 2016, it was reported that Marenco were increasing the pace of the flight test program, that P3 was to be completed within that year, and that type certification should occur during 2017. Marenco had 70 Letters of intent in autumn 2015 and 90 in spring 2016, half from North America. In September 2015 the company stated its expectation to produce 40-100 aircraft per year.

In October 2016, Stucki stated that P3 would be completed in early 2017, and that certification would likely occur within 2018. Development was delayed by having to design and manufacture not only the helicopter itself, but also supporting tools such as test equipment. P3's first flight finally occurred in November 2018.

==== PS4 & PS5 ====
In January 2019 Kopter stated that PS4's first flight would be in 2019, but in March 2021, Kopter stated that first flight of PS4 would be in third quarter of 2021 and PS5 some months later. In January 2023, Kopter stated that the first flight of PS4 would be in the first quarter of 2023 and PS5 to follow later in 2023.

==== Type certification & commercial deliveries ====
In March 2011, Marenco planned its first deliveries in 2015. In May 2016, it was reported that Marenco that type certification should occur during 2017. In October 2016, Stucki stated that certification would likely to occur within 2018. In January 2018 the company stated its hope that the rotorcraft would enter service in 2019. During the 2018 Heli-Expo, Kopter announced 23 firm orders and 11 options worth $119 million from Norwegian Helitrans (12+6), Elling Halvorson for Rainier Heli Lift, Hawaiian Paradise Helicopters and South African Safomar Aviation.

== Design ==
The SH09 is a light-medium helicopter, initially intended to be powered by a single Honeywell HTS900 turboshaft engine. It uses a shrouded fenestron tail rotor and the main rotor features a five-bladed bearingless hub; the shrouded tail rotor has a wider diameter and a thinner chord in order to increase airflow, while design aspects such as a narrow tail boom, swept-back tips on the main rotor blades, and the shrouded tail rotor offer reduced noise. The HTS900 is rated at 1,020-shaft-horsepower, and was intended to provide improved performance in hot and high conditions.

The monocoque fuselage is made from composite materials and is equipped with sliding side doors on either side along with a rear clamshell door; it incorporates a series of floor-mounted windows between the pilots' seats for additional vertical visibility. Some of the composite materials used have been produced using out of autoclave composite manufacturing from suppliers such as TenCate and Gurit. According to Marenco, inspiration for the fuselage's design was drawn from the automotive industry. It has been stated that the firm has sought to introduce the cabin volume of medium-sized twin-engine helicopters to the single-engine market.

The SH09 is offered with various different layout configurations. The standard option provides two pilot seats forward and four passenger seats aft, all adjustable fore/aft and up/down. In a high density configuration, five seats are installed in the rear position along with two more passenger seats inline with the pilot's own, which loses the option of the floor window. The use of Kevlar-threaded crashworthy fuel tanks, which are built into the wall and floor of the cargo hold, freed up space to allow for fully adjustable passenger seats in the cabin. The cargo hold is sized to accommodate 10 items of baggage, while the fuel tanks are sized to provide for an endurance of nearly five hours. The rear clamshell door and high-mounted tail boom were designed for air ambulance applications.

The SKH09 cockpit layout provides a generous field of view. A Sagem-built ICDS-8A glass cockpit suite is an integrated part of the SH09's standard avionics and instrumentation package. The rotorcraft has been designed with a condition-based maintenance policy, specifying that there should be no time between overhaul (TBO) limits on its various components and systems, including the engine; instead, maintenance is performed based upon condition, which is continuously monitored at all times by an onboard health and usage monitoring system (HUMS). Ease of maintenance and access to systems was an active consideration during the design phase, aiming to deliver lower overall maintenance costs.

In January 2023 Leonardo announced that the helicopter would be powered by the Safran Arriel 2K engine in place of the originally planned Honeywell powerplant.

== Variants ==
=== Base variant ===
The base variant is optimised for a multi-mission system. Among the roles it is designed to fulfil are:

- Passenger transport
- Utility
- EMS (emergency medical service)
- Security / police missions

=== Derivatives ===
==== Proteus UAS ====
In 2025, Leonardo unveiled a UAS that takes most part of the design of the AW09 Kopter. This is a military drone.

The first flight is planned for mid-2025. The contract for the design was signed in June 2022.

== Operational history ==
It was announced at Heli-Expo 2016 that Swiss operator Air Zermatt would serve as the SH09's launch customer.

== Specifications (SH09) ==
Data from Leonardo helicopters

General characteristics

- Crew: 1 (potentially 2)
- Capacity: Up to 8
- Length: 13.13 m (43 ft 1 in)
- Height: 3.74 m (12 ft 3 in)
- Volume: 6.5 m^{3} (230 cu ft)
- Empty weight: 1,300 kg (2,866 lb)
- Max takeoff weight: 2,850 kg (6,283 lb) with internal load, 3,000 kg (6,614 lb) with external load
- Fuel capacity: 750 liters (198 US gallons), 600 kg (1,323 lb)
- Rotor systems: 5 blades on bearingless main rotor, shrouded 120 cm tail rotor
- Powerplant: 1 × Safran Arriel 2K dual FADEC turbine engine , 750 kW (1,006 hp)
- Main rotor diameter: 10.96 m (35 ft 11 in)

Performance

- Cruise speed: 260 km/h (160 mph, 140 kn)
- Never exceed speed: 280 km/h (174 mph, 151 kn)
- Range: 800 km (500 mi, 430 nmi)
- Endurance: 5 hours
- Service ceiling: 6,100 m (20,000 ft) available with EASA RFM Revision 2 from mid-2025
- Take-off and landing max. altitude: 4,900 m (16,000 ft) available with EASA RFM Revision 2 from mid-2025
- Sling-load: 1,500 kg (3,307 lb)
- Temperature range: -40°C to +55°C (-40°F to +131°F)

Avionics

- Garmin G3000H integrated flight deck (modular glass cockpit)

== See also ==
Aircraft of comparable role, configuration, and era

- AgustaWestland AW119 Koala
- Bell 407
- Eurocopter EC130
