= Bell 407 =

Civil 7-seat utility helicopter

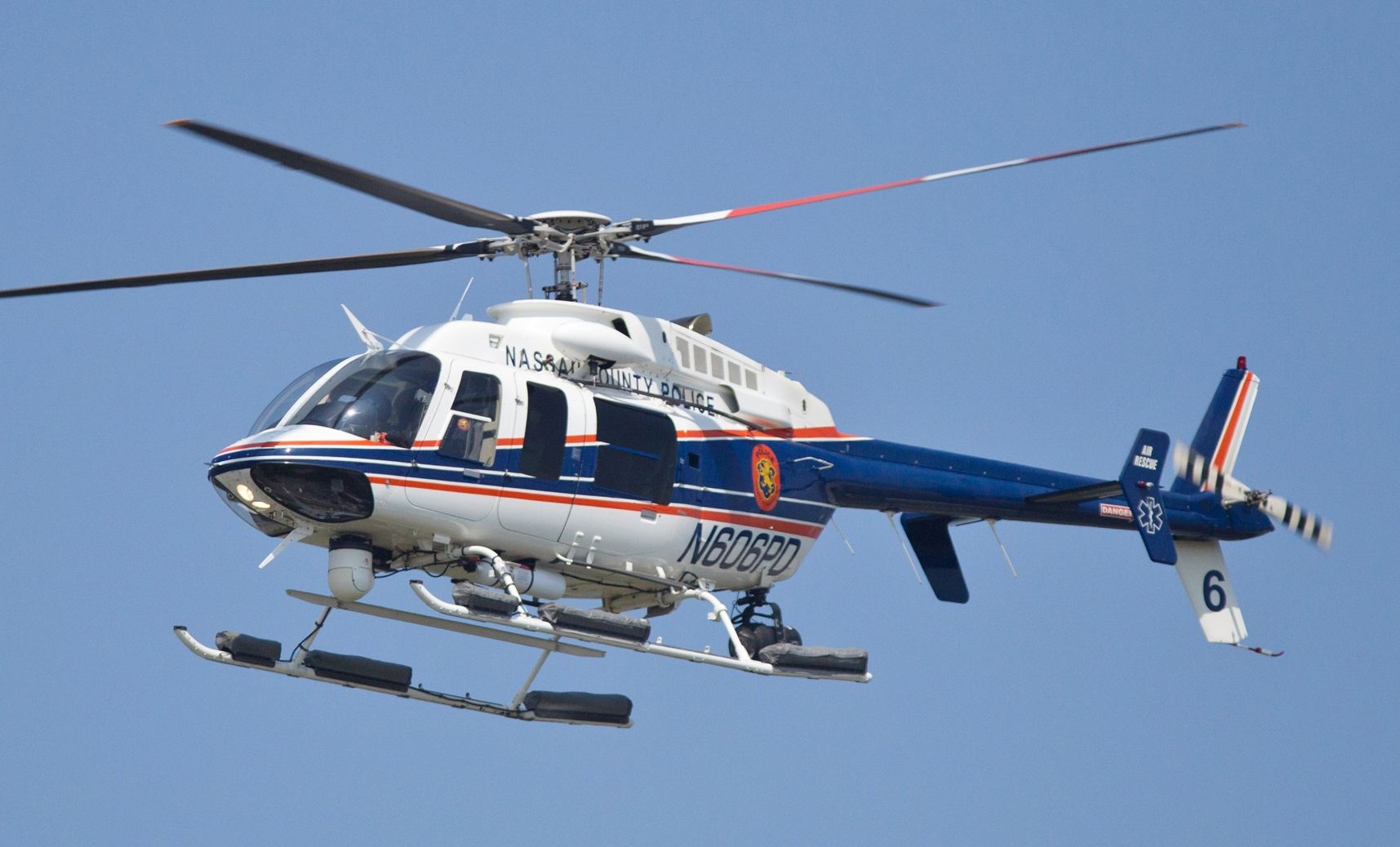
- A Bell 407 with the Nassau County Police Department in 2012

General information
- Type: Multipurpose utility helicopter
- National origin: United States/Canada
- Manufacturer: Bell Helicopter
- Status: In service
- Number built: 1600+ (Feb 2023)

History
- Manufactured: 1995–present
- Introduction date: 1996
- First flight: 29 June 1995
- Developed from: Bell 206L LongRanger
- Variant: Bell ARH-70 Arapaho
- Developed into: Bell 427; Northrop Grumman MQ-8C Fire Scout

The Bell 407 is a four-blade, single-engine, civil utility helicopter. A derivative of the Bell 206L-4 LongRanger, the 407 uses the four-blade, soft-in-plane design rotor with composite hub developed for the United States Army's OH-58D Kiowa Warrior instead of the two-blade, semi-rigid, teetering rotor of the 206L-4.

== Design and development ==
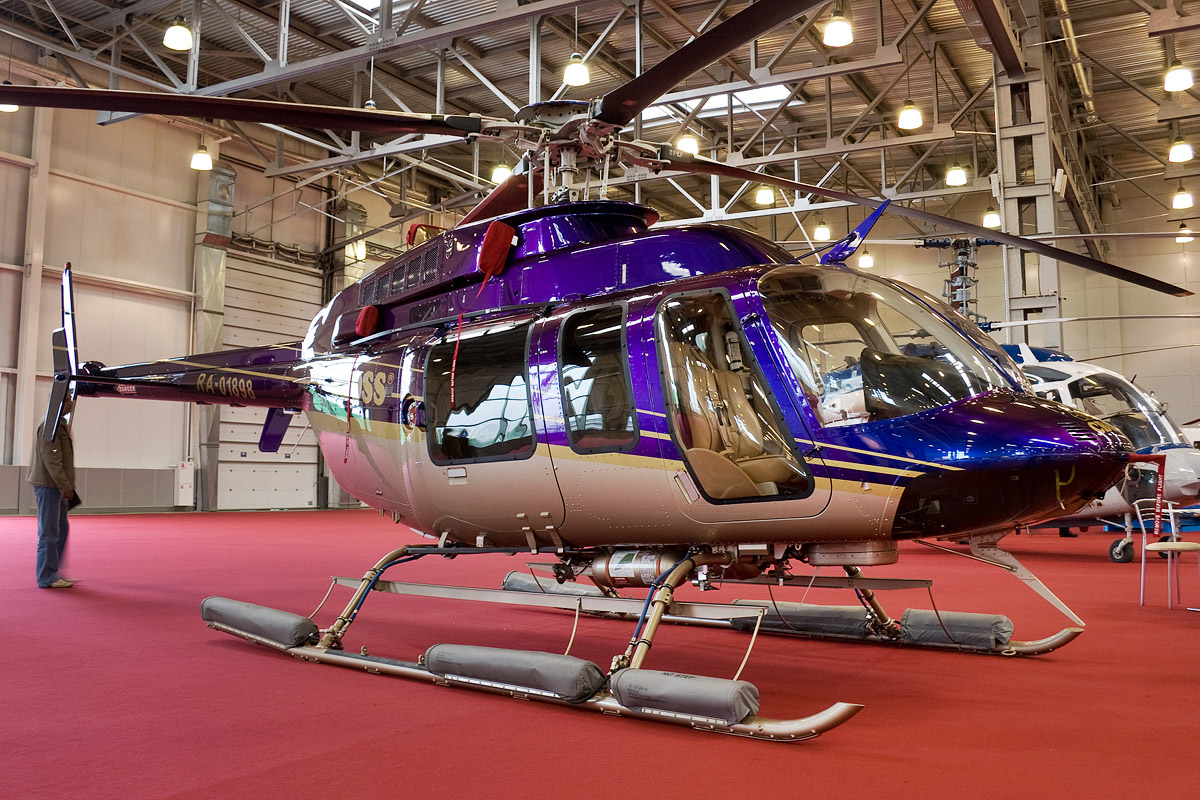
Bell 407 at HeliRussia 2008

In 1993, Bell began the development of the New Light Aircraft as a replacement for its Model 206 series. The program resulted in the 407, a development of Bell's LongRanger. A 206L-3 LongRanger was modified to serve as the 407 demonstrator. The demonstrator used hardware for the 407 and added molded fairings to represent the 407's wider fuselage then under development.

The demonstrator was first flown in 1994, and the 407 program was publicly announced at the Heli-Expo in Las Vegas, Nevada, in January 1995. The first 407 prototype (C-GFOS) made its maiden flight on June 29, 1995, and the second prototype (C-FORS) followed on July 13, 1995. After a short development program, the first production 407 (C-FWQY/N407BT) flew on November 10, 1995.

The Bell 407 features a four-blade main rotor derived from the OH-58D (Model 406). The blades and hub are of composite construction with unlimited service life, offering improved performance and a smoother ride. The fuselage is 8 inches (20 cm) wider, increasing internal cabin space, and includes main cabin windows that are 35% larger. The more powerful Rolls-Royce/Allison 250-C47 turboshaft allows an increased Maximum Takeoff Weight, improving performance at hotter temperatures and/or higher altitudes. The helicopter has standard seating for two crew and five passengers.

The 407 was certified by Transport Canada on February 9, 1996, with the FAA following shortly after on February 23. Full production began in 1996 at Bell's Mirabel, Quebec, Canada plant and produced 140 airframes in 1997, to fill the initial orders.

In 1995, Bell tested a shrouded tail rotor on the 407, but did not proceed. For a time, Bell studied a Model 407T twin-engine variant, but instead chose to develop the essentially all-new twin-PW206D powered Bell 427.

Bell began deliveries of the 407 in 1996. The 1,000th helicopter was delivered on June 15, 2010. 1,400+ by Dec 2017, and over 1600 were produced by early 2023.

=== ARH-70 and Bell 417 ===
The ARH-70 armed reconnaissance helicopter, developed for the U.S. Army was based on the 407, but canceled on October 16, 2008.

The Bell 417 was intended as a variant of the Bell 407, in essence a civil version of the Bell ARH-70. The 417 made its first flight on June 8, 2006. The 417 was to be powered by a Honeywell HTS900 turboshaft engine, producing 970 shp (720 kW) and includes full FADEC controls. The cabin sat five passengers in club-seating configuration, in addition to the crew of two. The civilian 417 was canceled at Heli-Expo 2007 in Orlando.

=== Bell 407GX and 407GT ===
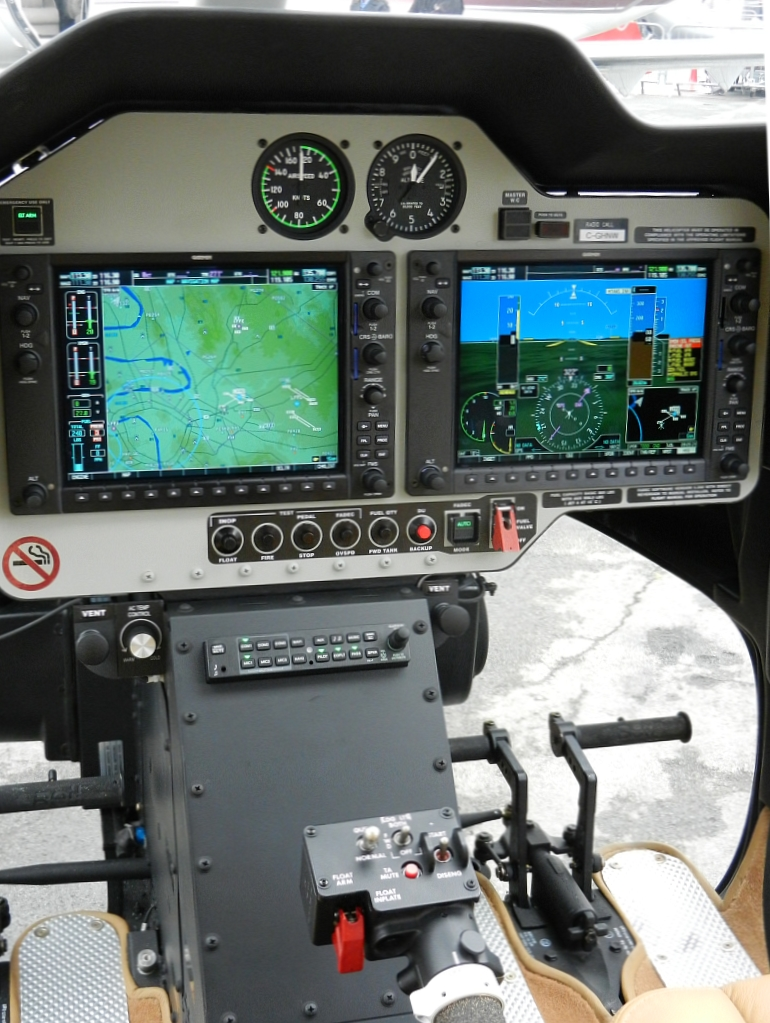
Bell 407 GX cockpit

On March 4, 2013, Bell unveiled a new armed version of the Bell 407GX, named the 407GT. It incorporates the Garmin G1000HTM flight deck to easily provide flight information. It can include infrared cameras, various armaments, and equipment to perform missions such as armed transport, search-and-rescue, reconnaissance, and medical evacuation. The GT version uses the Universal Weapons Pylon, derived from the Bell OH-58 Kiowa, to carry weapons such as machine guns, rockets, and anti-armor missiles.

=== Indian manufacturing line ===
As of October 7, 2025, Bell Textron is collaborating with Mumbai-based Max AeroSpace and Aviation to site an assembly plant in Nagpur, given it receives the reconnaissance and surveillance helicopters (RSH) from the Indian Ministry of Defence. The agreement is a result of Bell's memorandum of understanding (MoU) with the Government of Maharashtra to advance the state's helicopter manufacturing programme.

The Bell 407 will be offered for the reconnaissance and surveillance helicopters (RSH) tender of 200 helicopters for the Indian Army and Air Force against AW109 TrekkerM, HAL Light Utility Helicopter, and Airbus H125.

== Operational history ==
Bell made delivery of the first production 407 at Heli-Expo, in Dallas, Texas in February 1996. Launch customers for the aircraft were Petroleum Helicopters International (PHI), Niagara Helicopters, and Greenland Air.

On 23 May 2007, Colin Bodill and Jennifer Murray completed a record pole-to-pole around the world flight using a standard Bell 407. The flight originated from Bell's facility at the Fort Worth Alliance Airport on December 5, 2006. The team flew about 36,000 miles (58,000 km) over 189 days and 300 flight hours, through 34 countries. The project, named Polar First, was performed in partnership with the Royal Geographical Society to provide educational outreach to 28 international schools, which were visited during the trip. The project also served as a fundraiser for the SOS Children's Villages.

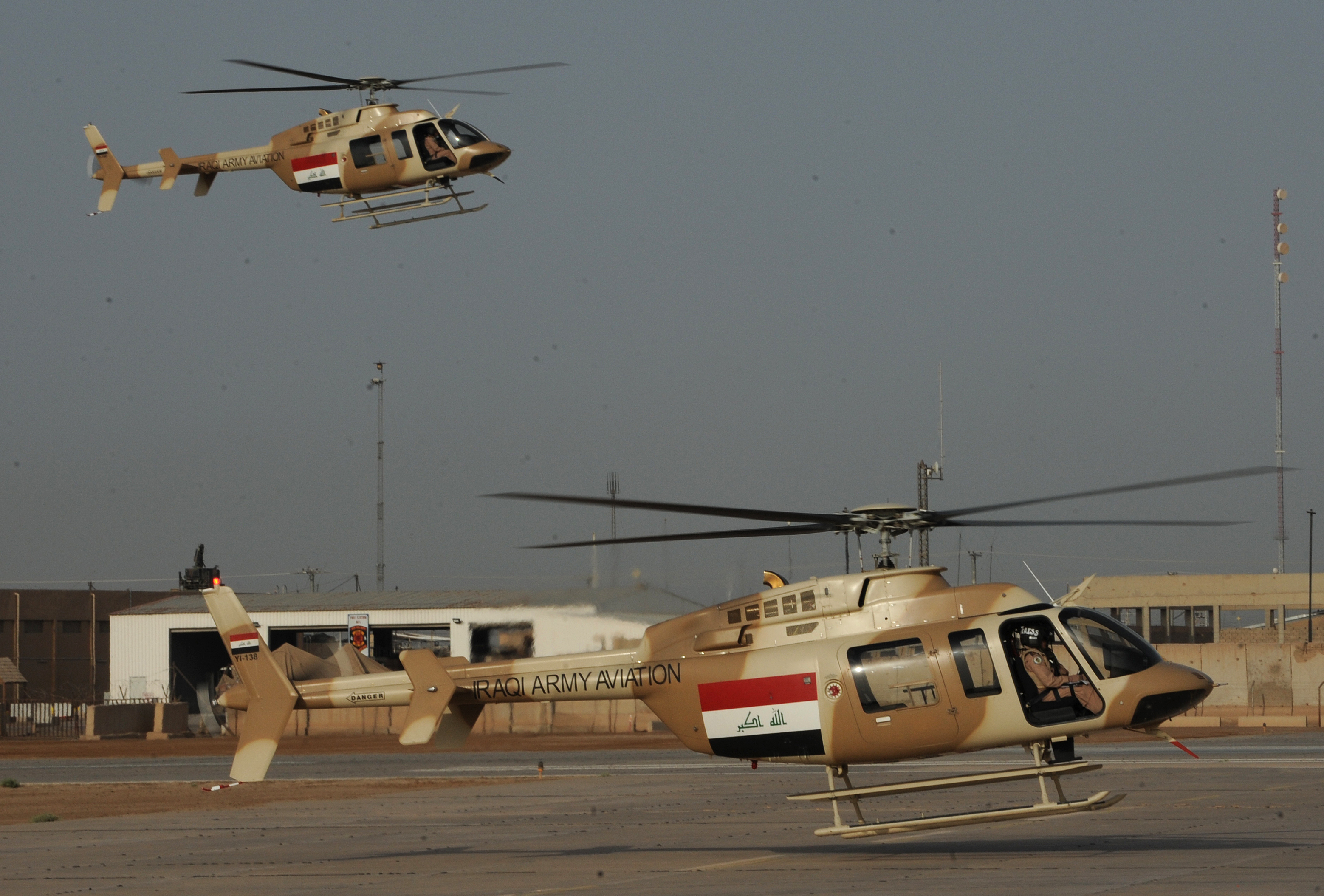
Iraqi Army Aviation Command Bell T-407s in 2011

In 2009 the Iraqi Air Force ordered three Bell 407 armed scout helicopters (similar to the canceled ARH-70). A contract for 24 additional Bell 407s with an option for 26 more was awarded in April of that same year. The U.S. Army is managing modifications and installation of military equipment on the helicopters. Three training T-407s were delivered to the Iraqi Army in 2010. Armed IA-407s were delivered in eight batches of three aircraft from August 2012 to April 2013. The final Bell 407 for Iraq was delivered on 3 April 2013. There are 30 in service; 24 armed scouts, three gunships, and three trainers.

Iraq is using the IA-407 in operations against Islamic State militants. On October 8, 2014, militants shot down an IA-407 using a shoulder-fired ground-to-air missile, killing the pilot and co-pilot.

In December 2017, more than 1,400 were operating.

== Variants ==
Kansas Highway Patrol Bell 407

Bell 407
A civil utility helicopter, a derivative of the Bell 206L-4.

ARH-70
An upgraded 407 version to serve as an armed reconnaissance helicopter.

Bell 417
Planned civil version of the ARH-70, was canceled.

Bell 407 Light Observation Helicopter
A military reconnaissance version.

Eagle 407 HP
Version from Eagle Copter (Alberta, Canada) with a more powerful Honeywell HTS900 engine, rated at 1,021 shp (760 kW).

Northrop Grumman MQ-8C Fire Scout
An unmanned aerial vehicle (UAV) version being developed by Northrop Grumman and Bell Helicopter as a cargo resupply demonstrator. The test aircraft flew on 10 December 2010 at the Yuma Proving Ground. In February 2011, the US Navy's budget request for 2012 included funds to buy 12 Fire-X helicopters under the designation MQ-8C.

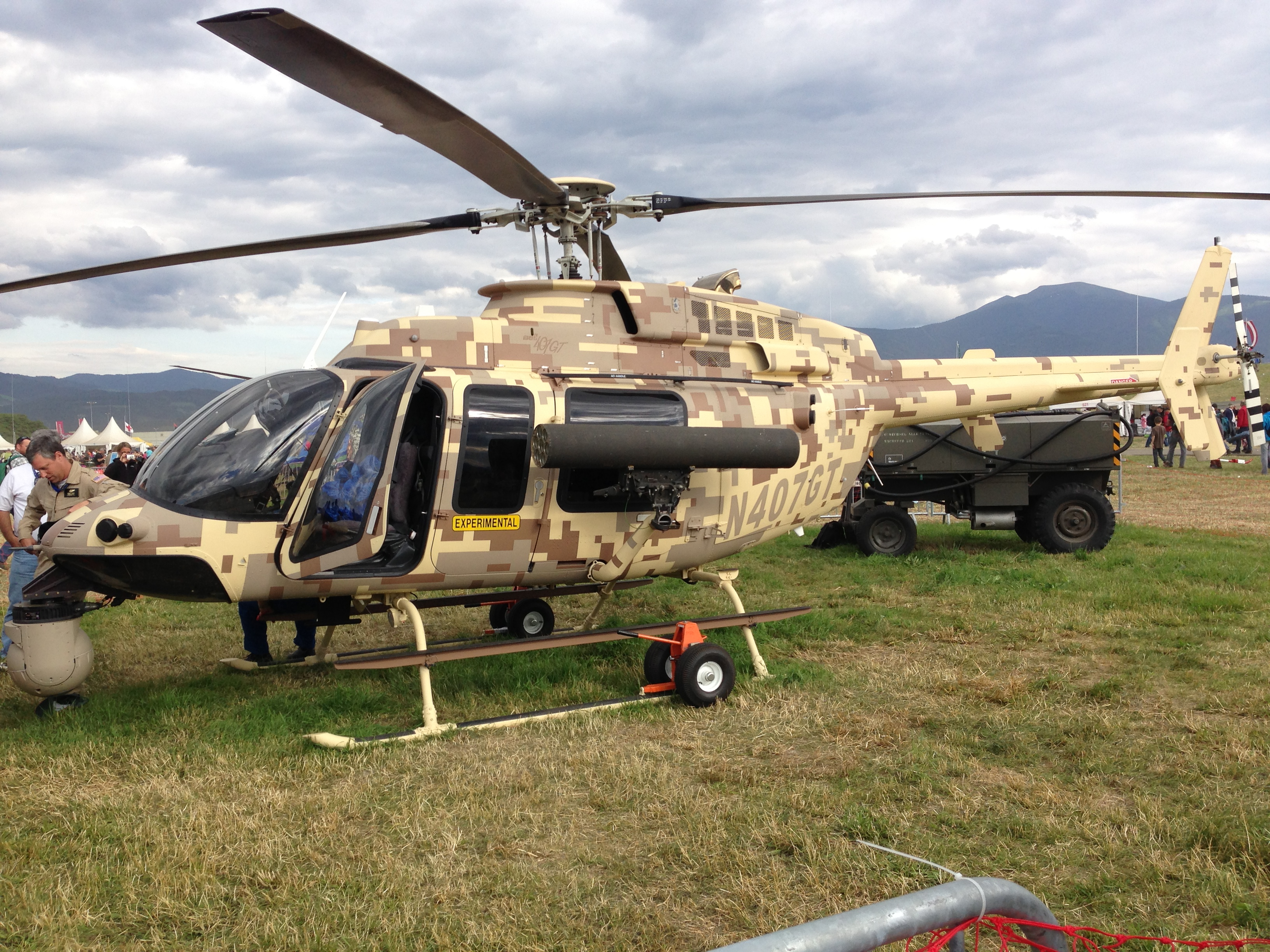
Bell 407 GT Experimental helicopter at Airpower 2013 in Zeltweg, Austria

Bell 407AH
An armed civil-certified version for use with government and security forces.

Bell 407GX
Version of the 407 that features the new Garmin G1000 H-model glass cockpit along with improved avionics and improved flight controls.

Bell 407GT
Armed version of the 407GX.

Bell 407GXP
Marketing designation for the 407 with Rolls-Royce 250-C47B/8 engine and Garmin G1000H avionics.

Bell 407GXi
Marketing designation for the 407 with Rolls-Royce 250-C47E/4 engine and Garmin G1000H NXi avionics.

== Operators ==
The Bell 407 is in civil service around the world with airlines, corporations, hospitals, government operators, and private individuals. It is also in service with several military operators.

=== Military and government ===
Argentina

- Argentine Air Force
- Argentine Army

Bangladesh

- Rapid Action Battalion

Guatemala

- Guatemalan Air Force

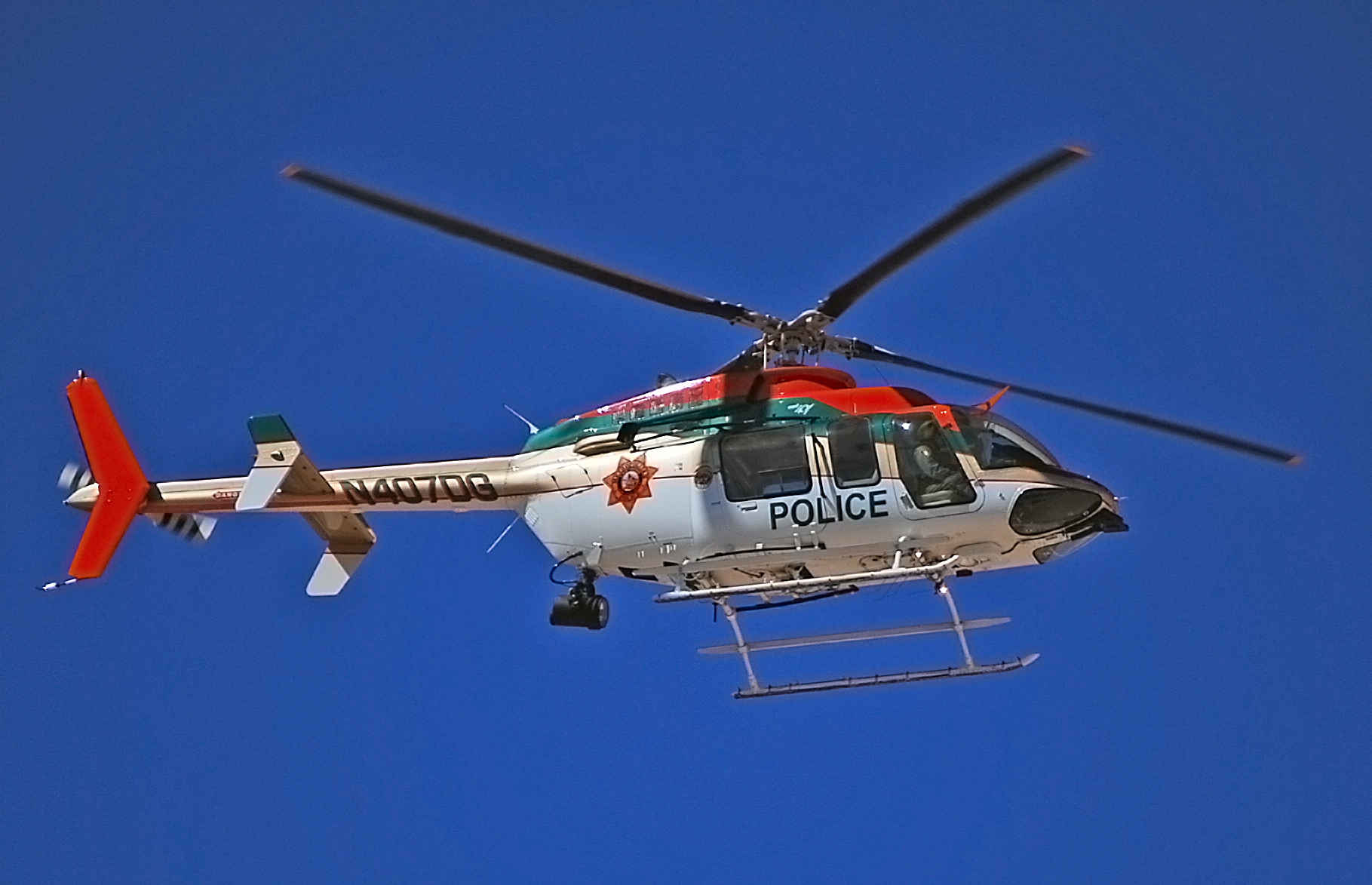
A Bell 407 with the Las Vegas Metropolitan Police

Iraq

- Iraqi Army Aviation Command

Jamaica

- Jamaica Defence Force

Mexico

- Mexican Air Force

Nepal

- Nepalese Army Air Service

Panama

- National Aeronaval Service

United Arab Emirates

- United Arab Emirates Air Force

United States

- Tennessee Valley Authority - 3 Units
- United States Army: 5 units

== Accidents ==
On June 4, 2022, Bell 407 GXP, N98ZA, was substantially damaged in an accident near Fairfield, New Jersey. The commercial pilot was seriously injured. Investigation by the US National Transportation Safety Board (NTSB) found that the tail rotor crosshead drive plate was not bolted to the tail rotor crosshead. The tail rotor had been installed the day before; it was suspected that the bolts were not properly torqued.

On June 8, 2022 a Bell 407 had an inflight separation of its tail boom while in cruise flight near Kalea, Hawaii. The pilot and two passengers sustained serious injuries, while three other passengers had minor injuries. The helicopter was substantially damaged during the crash. The US NTSB determined that the upper-left tail boom attachment hardware was not installed, leaving only three of four attachment points connected. Wreckage markings indicated that the bolt had been present at one point but had fallen out, resulting in progressive fatigue cracking. The NTSB requested immediate action from the US FAA and Transport Canada in the form of an urgent airworthiness directive.

On June 15, 2025, an Aryan Aviation Bell 407 VT-BKA crashed in Uttarakhand, India. The intended destination was Guptkashi. The helicopter was carrying Hindu pilgrims, seven people died, including the pilot and his two-year-old son. The Aircraft Accident Investigation Bureau were brought to the fore of the investigation.

== Specifications (Bell 407) ==
Bell 407 3-view drawing

Data from Bell 407

General characteristics

- Crew: one pilot
- Capacity: Typical seating configuration for seven comprising pilot and passengers, with five passengers in main cabin / 2,347 lb (1,065 kg) internal payload / Max hook capacity 1,200 kg (2,646 lb).
- Length: 41 ft 8 in (12.70 m)
- Height: 11 ft 8 in (3.56 m)
- Max takeoff weight: 6,000 lb (2,722 kg)
- Powerplant: 1 × Allison 250-C47B turboshaft engine, 813 shp (606 kW)
- Main rotor diameter: 35 ft 0 in (10.67 m)
- Main rotor area: 962 sq ft (89.4 m^{2})
- Blade section: - root: Boeing VR-7; tip: Narramore 8%

Performance

- Maximum speed: 140 kn (160 mph, 260 km/h)
- Cruise speed: 133 kn (153 mph, 246 km/h)
- Range: 324 nmi (373 mi, 600 km)
- Service ceiling: 18,690 ft (5,700 m)

== See also ==
Related development

- Bell 206
- Bell 400A
- Bell 427
- Bell ARH-70 Arapaho
- Northrop Grumman MQ-8C Fire Scout

Aircraft of comparable role, configuration, and era

- AgustaWestland AW119 Koala
- Eurocopter AS350 Écureuil
- Eurocopter Fennec
- Eurocopter EC120 Colibri
- Eurocopter EC130
- Eurocopter EC135
- Kopter AW09
- MD Helicopters MD 600
- Kazan Ansat

Related lists

- List of most produced rotorcraft
