= List of Pilatus PC-12 operators =

As of October 2019, 1,700 Pilatus PC-12s have been delivered. Most are used in the civil market.

== Civilian ==
=== Airline operators ===
Bhutan

- Tashi Air

Brazil

- Azul Brazilian Airlines

Canada

- Air Bravo Corp
- Chrono Aviation
- Nakina Air Service
- North Star Air
- Pascan Aviation
- Wasaya Airways
- Tantalus Air
- Harbour Air

Chile

- Aerocardal

China

- Jiangxi Express Airlines

Czech Republic

- Alpha Aviation (12x PC-12)

Denmark

- Air Alsie

Finland

- Hendell Aviation

France

- St Barth Executive (4x PC-12)

Kenya

- Amref Health Africa

Luxembourg

- JetFly

Netherlands

- Silver Flight

Russia

- Dexter Air Taxi

Switzerland

- Fly7 (23x PC-12)

United Kingdom

- Oriens Flight Operations

United States

- Advanced Air
- Alaska Seaplanes
- Aviation Charters, Inc
- Boutique Air
- Labcorp
- PlaneSense
- Quest Diagnostics
- SeaPort Airlines
- Surf Air
- Tradewind Aviation

Tanzania

- Coastal Aviation

=== Other notable civil operators ===
Australia

- Royal Flying Doctor Service - operates 31 PC-12s for EMS/medical transport duties.

South Africa

- Comair Flight Services (Charter) - operates 11 PC-12s
- South African Red Cross Air Mercy Service (Medevac) - operates 5 PC-12s
- Fireblade Aviation (Charter) - operates 2 PC-12s
- Execujet (Charter) - operates 8 PC-12s
- Absolute Aviation (Charter) - operates 1 PC-12 (1 known PC-12)

United States

- PlaneSense (Fractional/Charter) - operates 35 PC-12s
- AirSmart (Fractional/Charter) - operates 7 PC-12s

=== Government ===
Argentina

- Argentine National Gendarmerie - operates two PC-12s

Australia

- Western Australia Police - operates two PC-12s for staff transport, search and rescue and disaster relief.
- Northern Territory Police
- South Australia Police

Canada

- Ontario Provincial Police - PC-12/45 with a camera mounted under the fuselage
- Ornge - operates 10 PC-12 NG for aeromedical transport
- Nishnawbe-Aski Police Service
- Royal Canadian Mounted Police

Switzerland

- 1 PC-12 NG Federal Office of Civil Aviation

United States

- Bureau of Land Management - 1997 PC-12 N190PE - utility and fire logistics support. Use split between Alaska Fire Service and Boise NAO.
- Colorado Department of Public Safety Division of Fire Prevention and Control - 2 PC-12 Spectre for wildland fire and SAR missions.
- Customs & Border Protection - Office of Air & Marine (U.S. Department of Homeland Security)
- NASA Glenn Research Center - 2008 PC-12 N990AG in support of NASA's Advanced Air Mobility mission
- Phoenix Police Department (Arizona) - Two PC-12M Spectre N620FB and N630FB - for surveillance and light transport duties.
- Texas Department of Public Safety - 2 PC-12 Spectres, to provide air patrol, criminal surveillance and rescue. N219TX is named for the late Texas Highway Patrol Trooper Ernesto Alanis and based in Edinburg, Texas, and N243TX is named for the late Texas Ranger Bobby Paul Doherty and based in San Antonio
- State Of Wisconsin - 3 PC-12s operated by Wisconsin Air Services to provide air transportation services for State and University of Wisconsin officials
- The Commonwealth of Pennsylvania - PC-12/47E operated by the Pennsylvania State Police Aviation Patrol Unit 3 based in Harrisburg, Pennsylvania.

== Military ==
Bulgaria

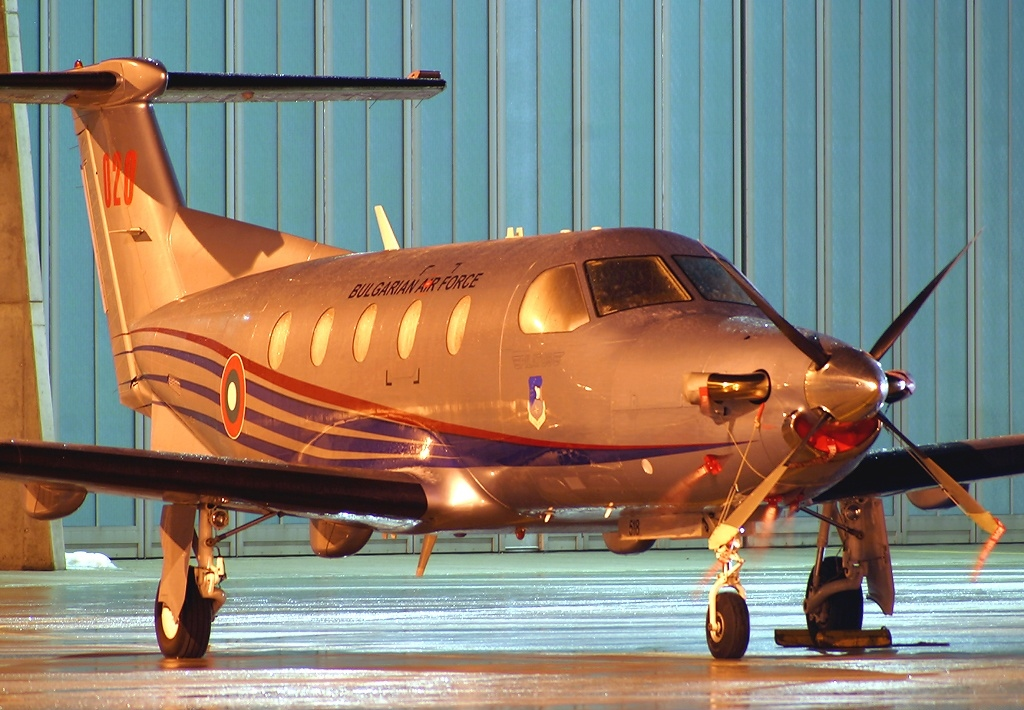
Bulgarian Air Force PC-12

- Bulgarian Air Force - operates one PC-12 for VIP and cargo transport.

Chad

- Chadian Air Force - operated one aircraft modified with a FLIR turret, damaged in the July 2017 N'Djamena storm.

Finland

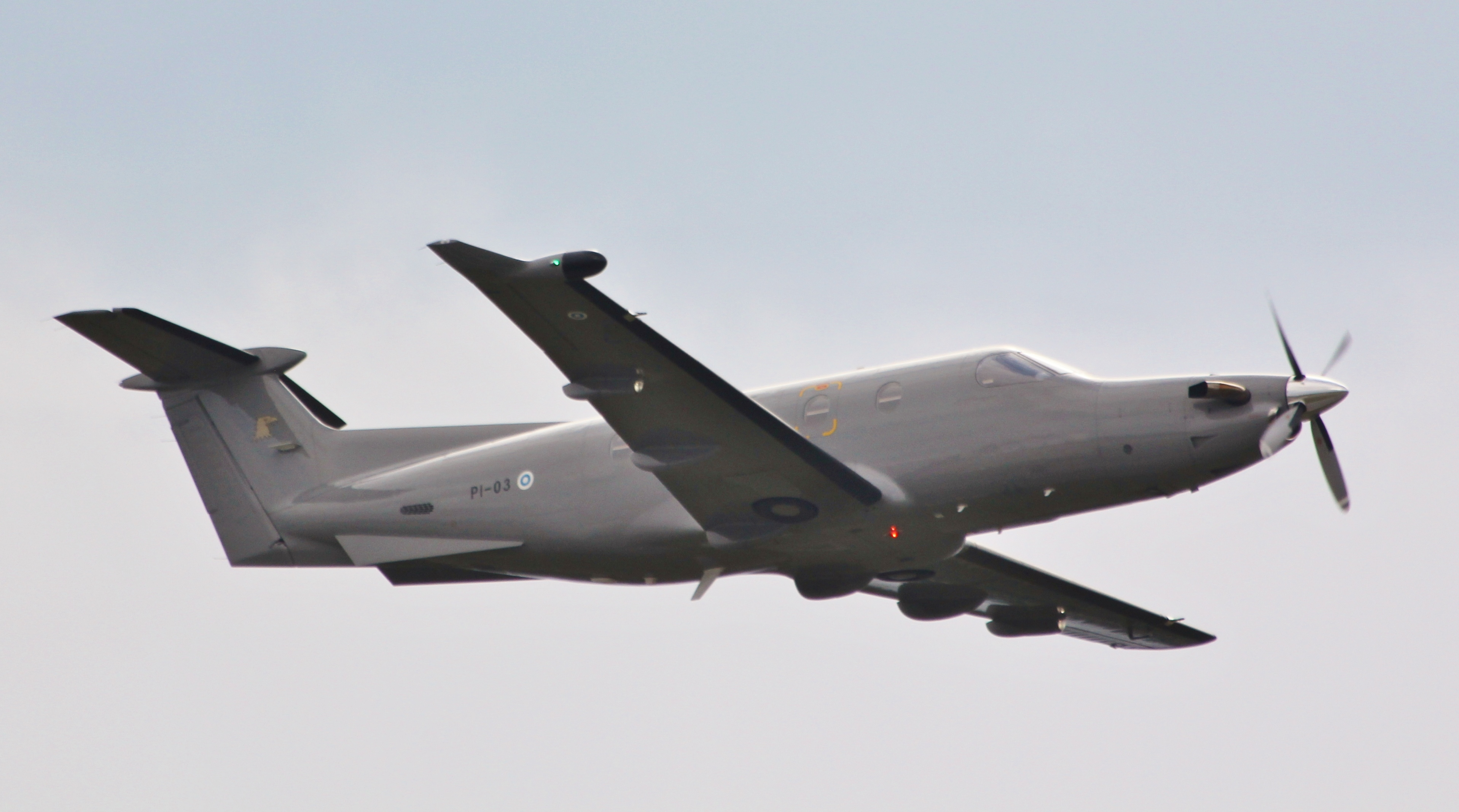
A Finnish PC-12NG in flight

- Finnish Air Force - operates six PC-12NG aircraft as liaison aircraft.

Germany

- Bundeswehr - Used by the Technical and Airworthiness Center for Aircraft and Aeronautical Equipment of the German Armed Forces.

Ireland

- Irish Air Corps - operates four aircraft, one PC-12NG aircraft in a utility transport role, and three PC-12M SPECTRE aircraft were delivered in September 2020 for reconnaissance and transport purposes.

South Africa

- South African Air Force - operates one PC-12 with 41 Squadron for VIP transport.

Switzerland

- Swiss Air Force - operates one PC-12 for research flights and VIP transport.

United States

- United States Air Force - operates 35 PC-12, designated U-28A Draco, for special operations (Air Force Special Operations Command).
  - 1st Special Operations Wing
    - 319th Special Operations Squadron
  - 27th Special Operations Group
    - 318th Special Operations Squadron
  - 492d Special Operations Wing
    - 6th Special Operations Squadron
    - 19th Special Operations Squadron
  - 919th Special Operations Wing
    - 5th Special Operations Squadron
- United States Navy - operates 1 PC-12NG

== Former operators ==
=== Civilian ===
==== Airline operators ====
Canada

- Bearskin Airlines
- NAC Air
- Peace Air

New Zealand

- Sounds Air

=== Military ===
Afghanistan

- Afghan Air Force - operates 18 PC-12NG variants for special operations use. (Similar to USAF U-28A); 13 were delivered in March 2015. In addition Sierra Nevada Corporation has provide five SIGINT aircraft by the end of the year.

United States

- USAF 318th Special Operations Squadron 1st Special Operations Group
