= AgustaWestland AW119 Koala =

Single-engine, eight-seat utility helicopter manufactured by Leonardo

AW119 Koala
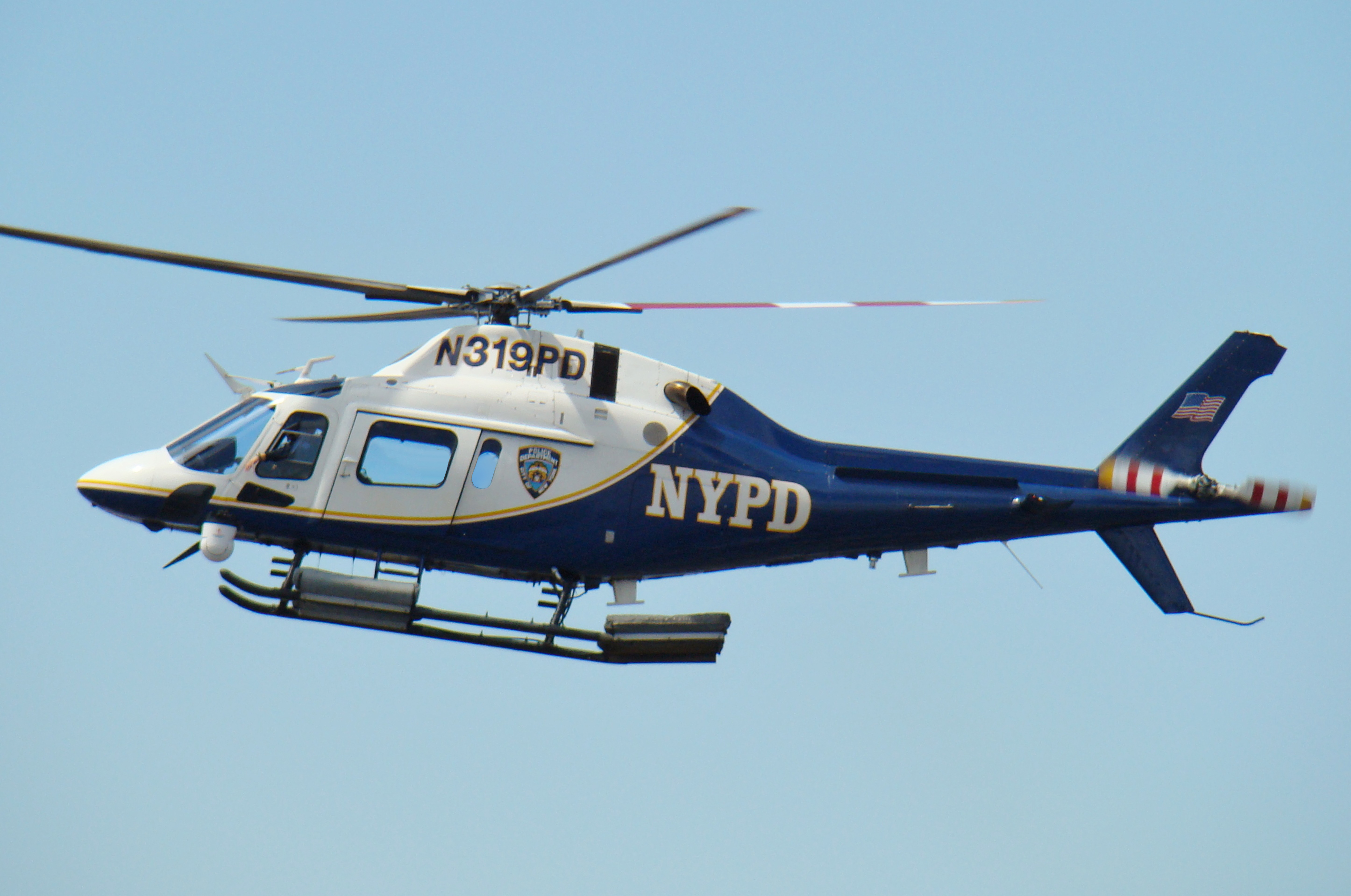
- An AW119 with the New York City Police Department

General information
- Type: Utility helicopter
- Manufacturer: Leonardo, previously Finmeccanica, AgustaWestland, Agusta
- Status: In production
- Primary users: State of Mexico Government Finnish Border Guard; Portuguese Air Force; United States Navy
- Number built: ~300 (2018)

History
- Manufactured: 2000–present
- Introduction date: 2000
- First flight: February 1995
- Developed from: AgustaWestland AW109

The AgustaWestland AW119 Koala, produced by Leonardo since 2016, is an eight-seat utility helicopter powered by a single turboshaft engine produced for the civil market. Introduced as the Agusta A119 Koala prior to the Agusta-Westland merger, it is targeted at operators favoring lower running costs of a single-engine aircraft over the redundancy of a twin.

== Development ==
The A119 designation was first applied to a proposed 11-seat stretched version of the AW109 in the 1970s; however this concept did not emerge and no such rotorcraft actually built. The helicopter that was eventually to enter production as the A119 was conceived in 1994, as Agusta was recovering from a period of financial woes that had nearly put the company out of business. In February 1995, the second of two prototypes conducted its first flight. The first prototype was used for static tests. Civil certification was originally anticipated in 1997, this deadline was missed allegedly due to multiple issues such as personnel problems, the need to concentrate resources on the development of the A109 Power, and further development to increase the aircraft's performance to meet customer expectations.

By way of a solution to the latter concern, the decision was taken to change the A119's powerplant. The prototypes were originally fitted with Turboméca Arriel 2K1 turboshafts, however the Pratt & Whitney Canada PT6B was chosen in its place. In 1998, the prototypes were remanufactured with this engine, and assigned new serial numbers. Certification was now expected by the fourth quarter of that year, but this date slipped to July 1999, and it was eventually December before Italian RAI certification was awarded. US FAA certification was awarded in February the following year. Customer deliveries began soon thereafter, the first commercial example was delivered to Australian logistics company Linfox (serial 14007, registration VH-FOX).

In April 2007, the AW119Ke (Ke standing for Koala Enhanced) was formally unveiled at Heli-Expo; changes included modified rotor blade design and a higher rotor rpm, increasing both payload and hot-and-high performance, cabin flexibility was also improved. The fuselages of the AW119 are manufactured by PZL-Świdnik of Poland, later a subsidiary of AgustaWestland. Final assembly and other manufacturing activity initially took place at Vergiate, Italy; by the time the improved AW119Ke variant began production, the final assembly line had been transferred from Vergiate to AgustaWestland's facility in Philadelphia, United States.

During January 2010, a partnership agreement was signed between Indian conglomerate Tata Sons and AgustaWestland as the foundations for a new joint venture, Indian Rotorcraft. At the time, India was viewed by helicopter manufacturers as one of the biggest potential growth markets. During March 2012, Indian Rotorcraft broke ground on a 40,000m^{2} new facility adjacent to Rajiv Gandhi International Airport, Hyderabad, India; The first helicopters to be manufactured by the joint venture is slated to be the AgustaWestland AW119Ke; other types, such as the AgustaWestland AW101, are likely to follow in the future. During summer 2015, it was reported that further delays to starting assembly in India were likely as the Foreign Investment Promotion Board (FIPB), an Indian government agency, repeatedly deferred a pending decision. During May 2016, another pending ruling by the FIPB was deferred without any stated reason; allegedly, the FIPB is liaising with the Indian Ministry of Defence on the matter. The Indian government's apparent hesitancy on the issue has been alleged to be linked to the 2013 Indian helicopter bribery scandal.

== Design ==
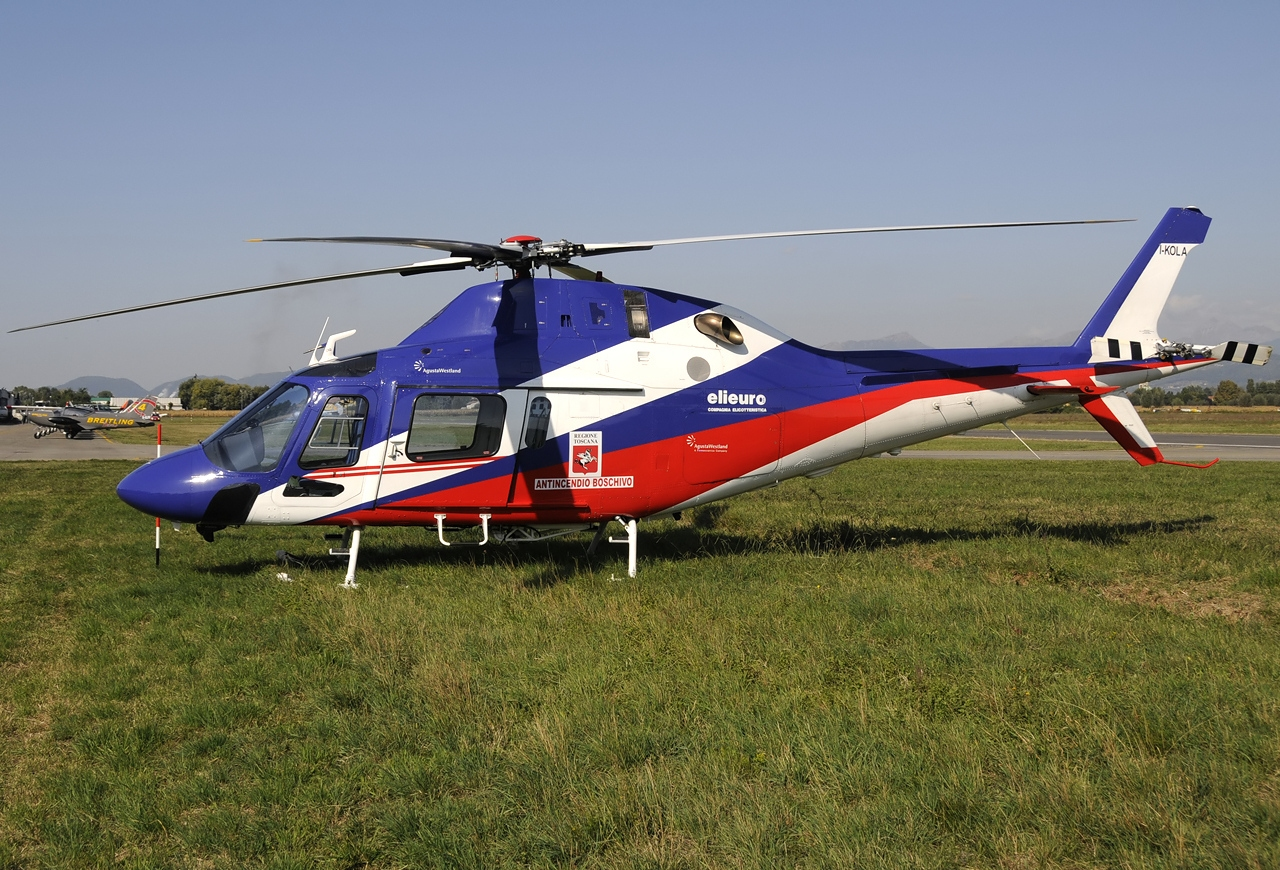
Agusta AW119 Koala, 2008

The AW119 is a single-engine multirole helicopter. AgustaWestland promote the type as possessing excellent flight qualities with high levels of controllability, maneuverability and inherent safety. The design of the rotorcraft is derived from Agusta's earlier and highly successful A109 helicopter, differing primarily by being equipped with a single engine (as the A109 was originally designed), a Pratt & Whitney PT6B-37A turboshaft engine, and using fixed skids in place of the A109's retractable wheeled landing gear arrangement. The AW119 shares the same cockpit and cabin of the AW109, along with commonality with various other systems, while costing roughly half of the latter's price tag. According to Flight International, the AW119 is competitively priced and provides good levels of accessibility, maintainability, comfort, noise levels, and speed.

The AW119 employs a four-bladed fully articulated main rotor; the composite rotor blades are designed to produce maximum lift with minimum noise, and feature tip caps to reduce noise and elastomeric bearings with no lubrication requirements. Aluminium honeycomb structural panels are used throughout the airframe, which absorb both noise and vibration, thus requiring no additional vibration absorption systems to be employed. The PT6B-37A powerplant of the AW119, located in the same area as the AW109's engines, is capable of providing high power margins along with generous speeds and endurance. According to AgustaWestland, the AW119 retains the system redundancy of dual engine helicopters, such as the hydraulics and the dual independent stability augmentation systems. The gearbox has a 30-minute dry run capability.

The AW119 Koala has been used for various roles, including utility, emergency medical services (EMS), offshore, law enforcement, and executive transport. A key selling point of the type is its wide-body fuselage, which allows for up to seven passengers to be seated in a three-abreast configuration in the cabin; for the EMS mission, up to two stretchers along with medical attendants and full emergency medical equipment suite can be accommodated, whereas most similar-sized helicopters can only carry one. The unobstructed cabin area and separate baggage compartment can be rapidly reconfigured to suit a range of different missions and roles. Several different cabin interiors may be adopted to accommodate different missions and operations, such as executive/VIP, EMS, and utility options; the cockpit can also be isolated from the cabin. The AW119 has been promoted as possessing the largest cabin in its class; the reported cabin volume is approximately 30% greater than other rotorcraft in its class.

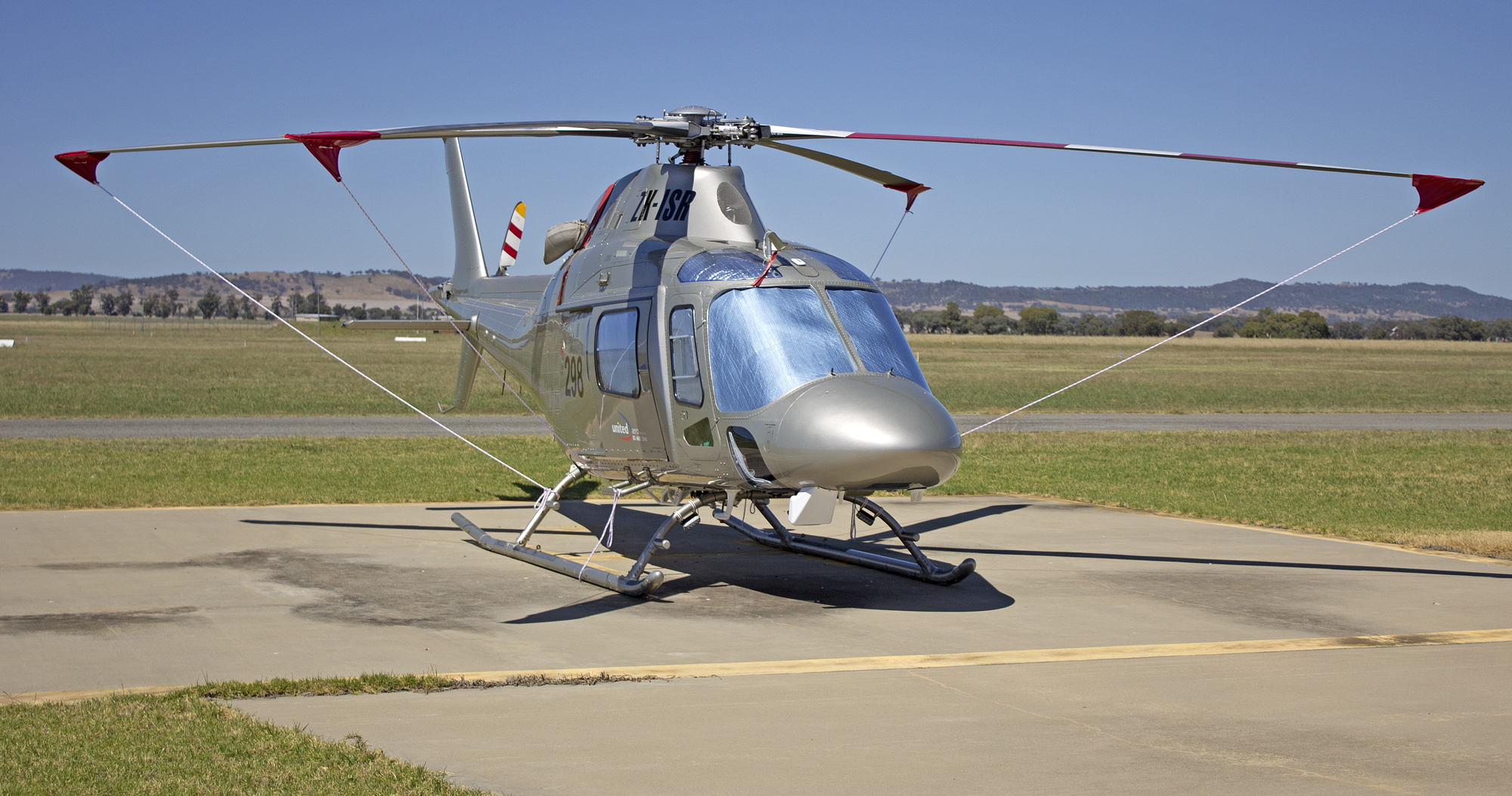
AW119 Koala Ke at Wagga Wagga Airport, 2012

A wide range of avionics have been integrated upon the AW119, which are typically housed within the rotorcraft's nose. Initial production models featured conventional flight instruments; the Garmin G1000 glass cockpit is integrated on the newer AW119Kx variant, which is claimed to improve situational awareness, reduce pilot workload, and increase safety. Primary flight and other key information is displayed to the pilots upon two large 10.4 inch multi-function displays in the cockpit; an independently powered stand-by display is also present in case of system failure. Other avionics used include a 3-axis aircraft flight control system (AFCS), Synthetic Vision System (SVS), Highway In The Sky (HITS) depiction, moving map display, radio altimeter, VOR/ILS/GPS/WAAS navigation, Aural Warning Generator, and embedded Helicopter Terrain Avoidance Warning System (HTAWS).

A variety of equipment can be equipped, dependent on operator choice and role; these include an external hoist, dual cargo hook, dual flight controls, baggage compartment extension, snow skis, windshield wipers, rotor brake, multi-band radios, active noise reduction headsets, soundproofing, oxygen systems, loud speakers, search lights, retractable landing light, emergency floatation equipment, reinforced windshield, wire strike protection system, rappelling kit, fire fighting belly tank, and a forward looking infrared (FLIR) camera. Three fuel tanks, located behind the rear seats in the cabin, are installed as standard; up to two additional optional tanks can be fitted for a total of five, providing a flight endurance of nearly six hours.

== Operational history ==
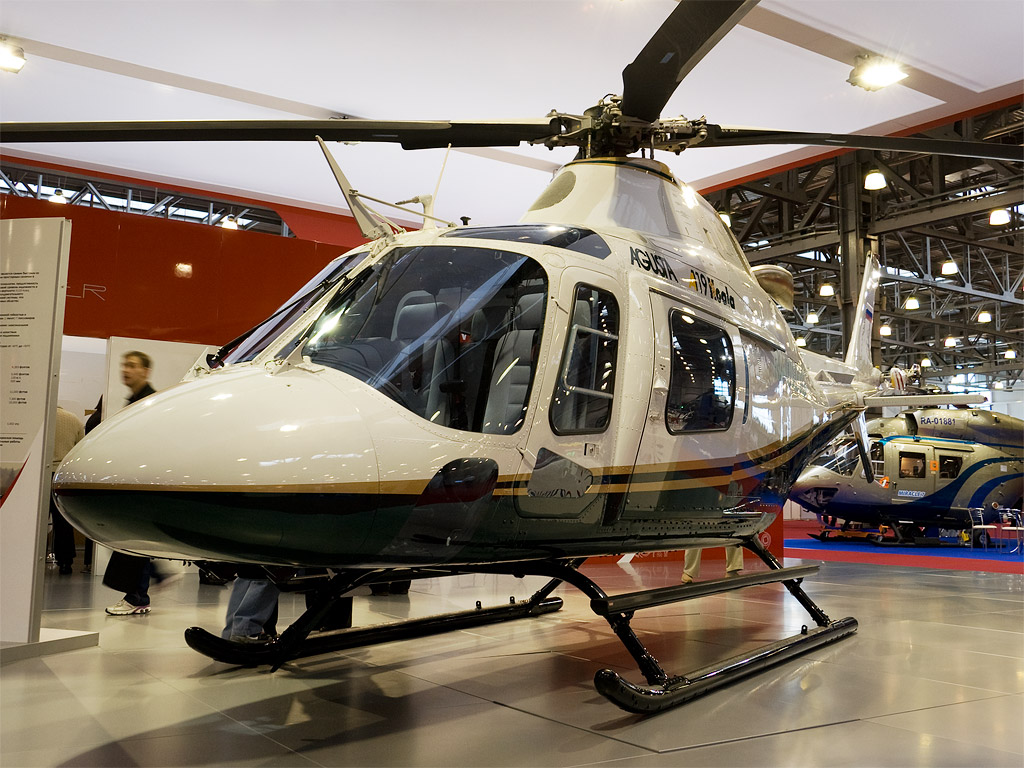
Agusta A119 Koala at HeliRussia 2008

Since 2009, there have been reports that final assembly of the AW119 is to be transferred to India as a part of a measure to increase sales within that market. In February 2010, it was announced that AgustaWestland and Tata Group were to form a joint venture to produce the AW119 in India; the first Indian-manufactured units were originally planned to commence deliveries in 2011. In October 2015, following two years of deliberation, India's Foreign Investment Promotion Board approved a proposal to locally assemble the AW119Kx in Hyderabad, Telangana; the facility is to be operated by Indian Rotorcraft Ltd (IRL), the joint venture between AgustaWestland and Tata.

In September 2014, AgustaWestland issued a legal challenge to a United States Army decision to procure the Eurocopter UH-72 Lakota as a trainer without a competition, stating that both the AW119 and the AW109 had lower acquisition and operating costs; the challenge was dismissed in December 2014.

In early 2015, AgustaWestland and Bristow Helicopters jointly offered an upgraded variant of the AW119 as a replacement for US Navy's existing fleet of 117 Bell TH-57 (based on the Bell 206) trainer helicopters under a fee-for-service contract; the companies claimed that over a four-year period the AW119 fleet could be introduced at an equal or lesser cost than that of continuing to operate the aging TH-57s. Marketed by Leonardo as TH-119, it features a Genesys Aerosystems glass cockpit. It first flew on 20 December 2018.

The TH-119 was selected as the successor of the TH-57 in January 2020, receiving the US military designation TH-73A. The US Navy expects up to 130 units to be acquired, with 32 ordered in January and an additional 36 in November 2020. In August 2021, the TH-73 was named "Thrasher" for the brown thrasher, a bird common in the southeast US; the first example of the type was delivered on August 6.

== Variants ==
- A119 - designation for the original production version; maximum take-off weight: 2,720 kg (5,997 lb).
  - AW119 - designation for the A119 following the merger of Agusta and Westland Helicopters.
- AW119 MkII - improved version, featuring redesigned rotors, greater payload, and better fuel efficiency; maximum take-off weight: 2,850 kg (6,283 lb).
  - AW119 Ke - marketing designation for the AW119 MkII (Koala Enhanced).
  - AW119 Kx - successor to the Ke model with Garmin G1000H avionic suite, produced in Philadelphia, USA and Hyderabad, India.
  - TH-73A Thrasher - military training variant for the US Navy

== Operators ==
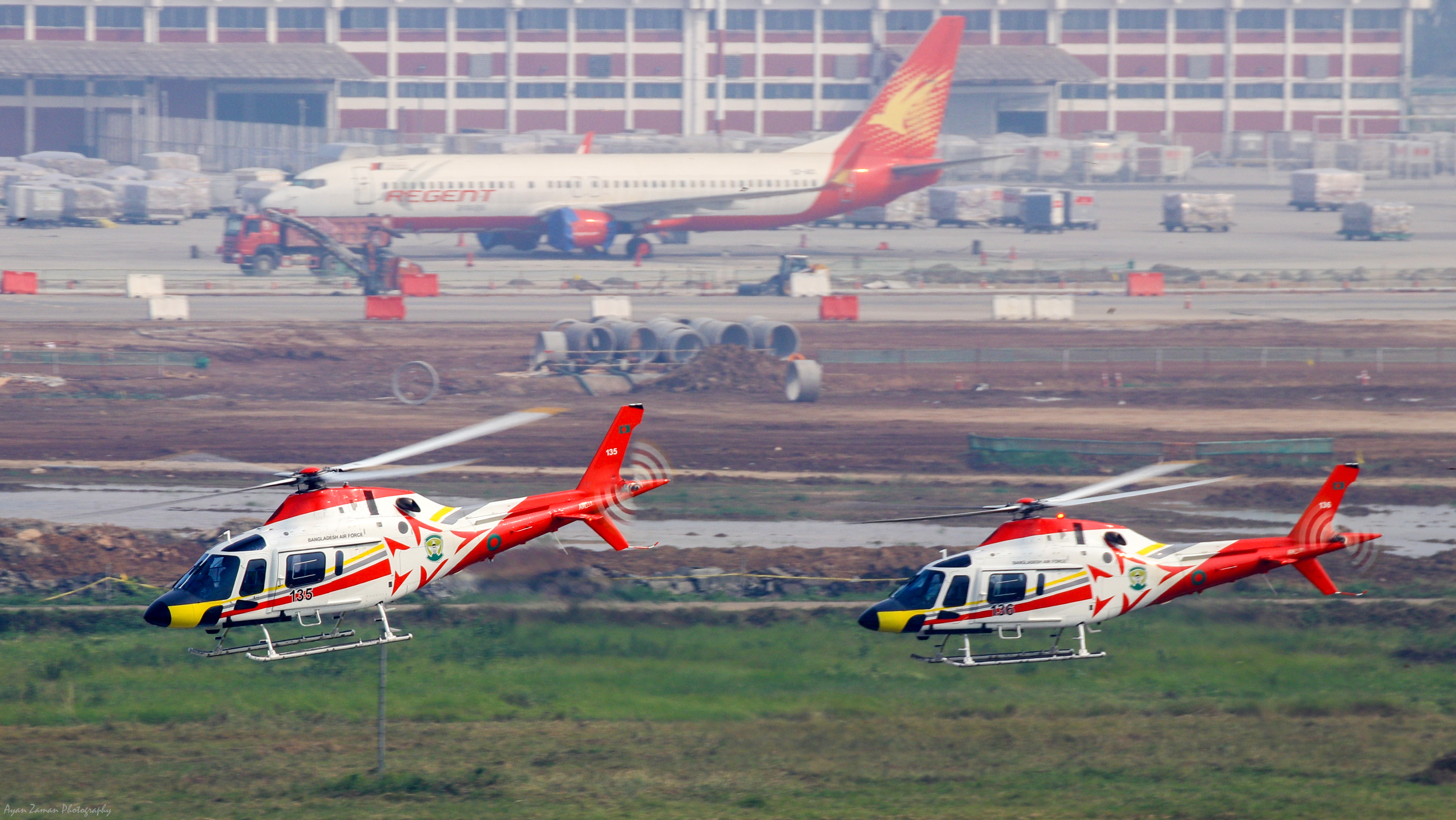
Bangladesh Air Force AW119Kx's heading to Victory Day Formation Flying

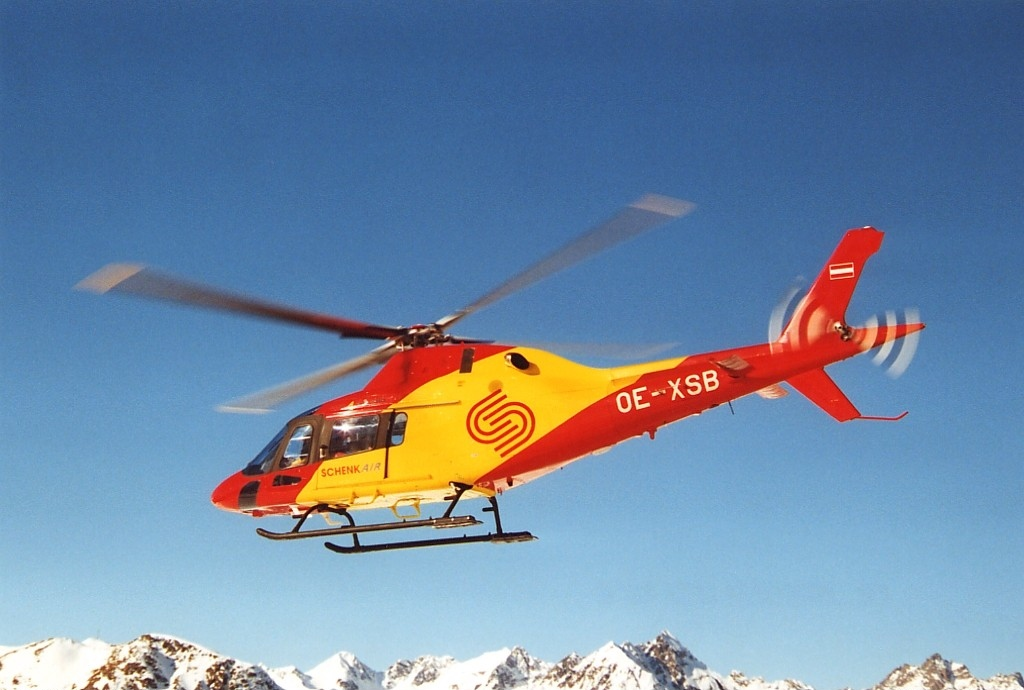
An AW119 of Schenk Air

A119 of the Phoenix Police Department

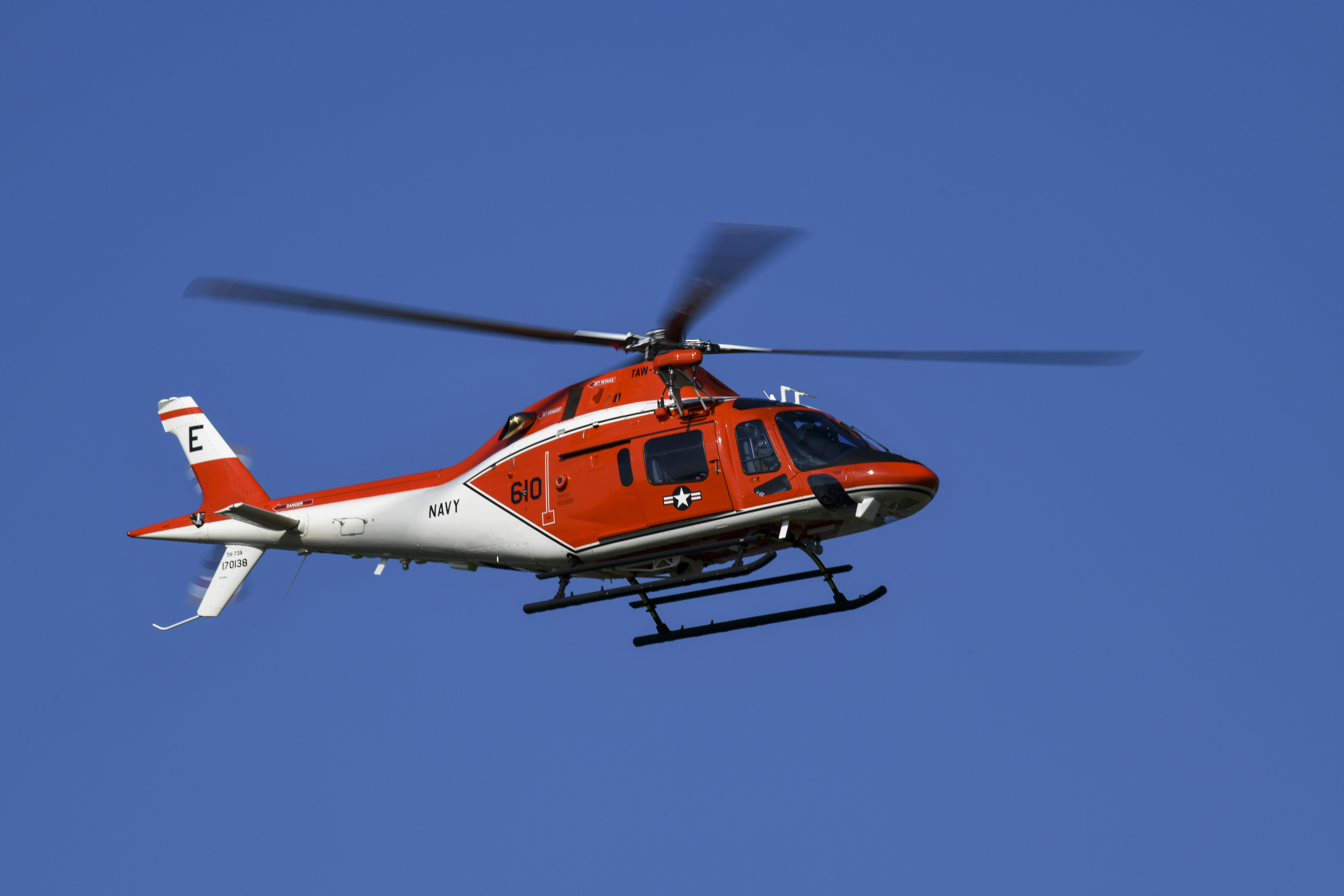
U.S. Navy TH-73A Thrasher

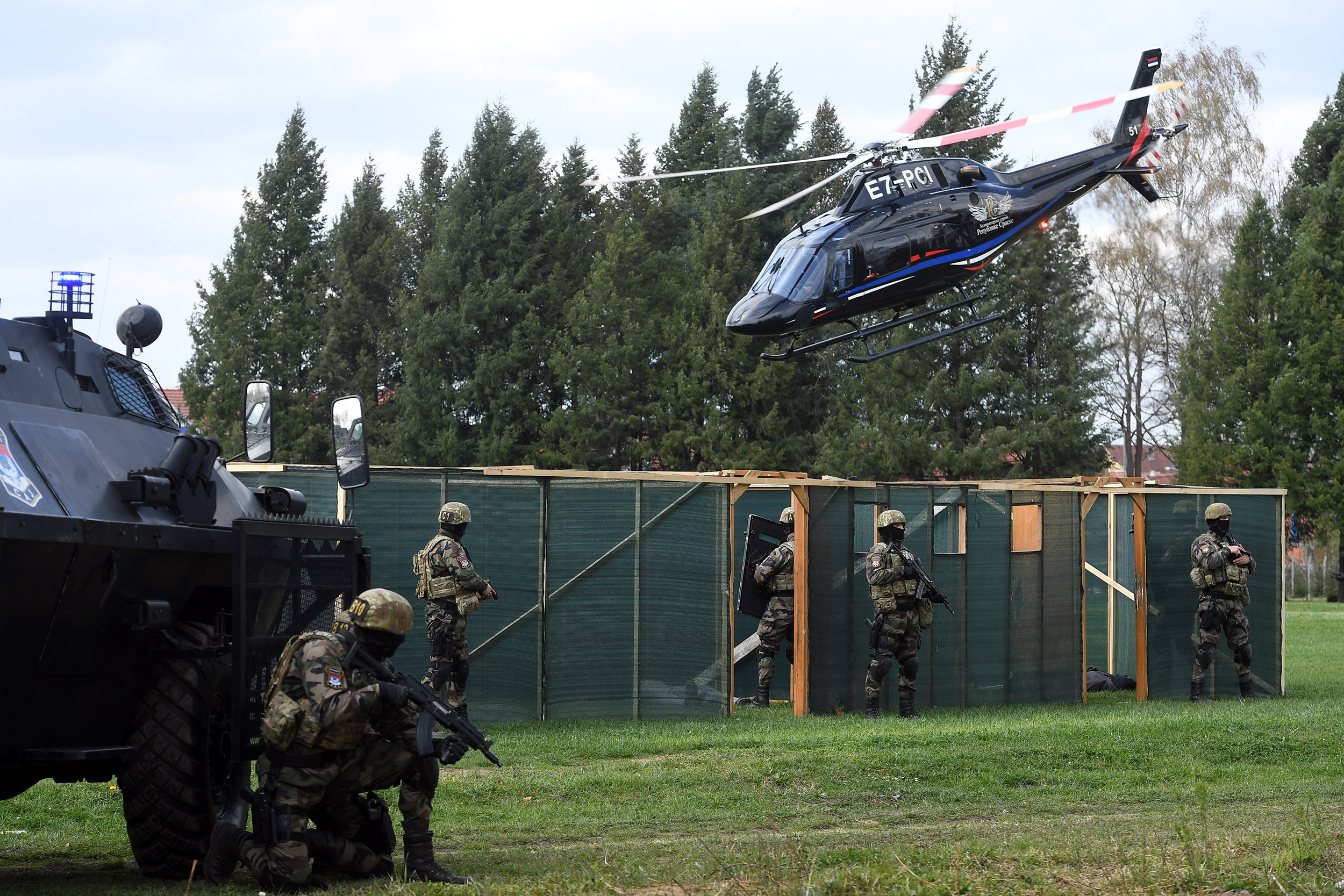
AW119 of Republika Srpska Helicopter Service participating in Special Anti-Terrorist Unit exercise

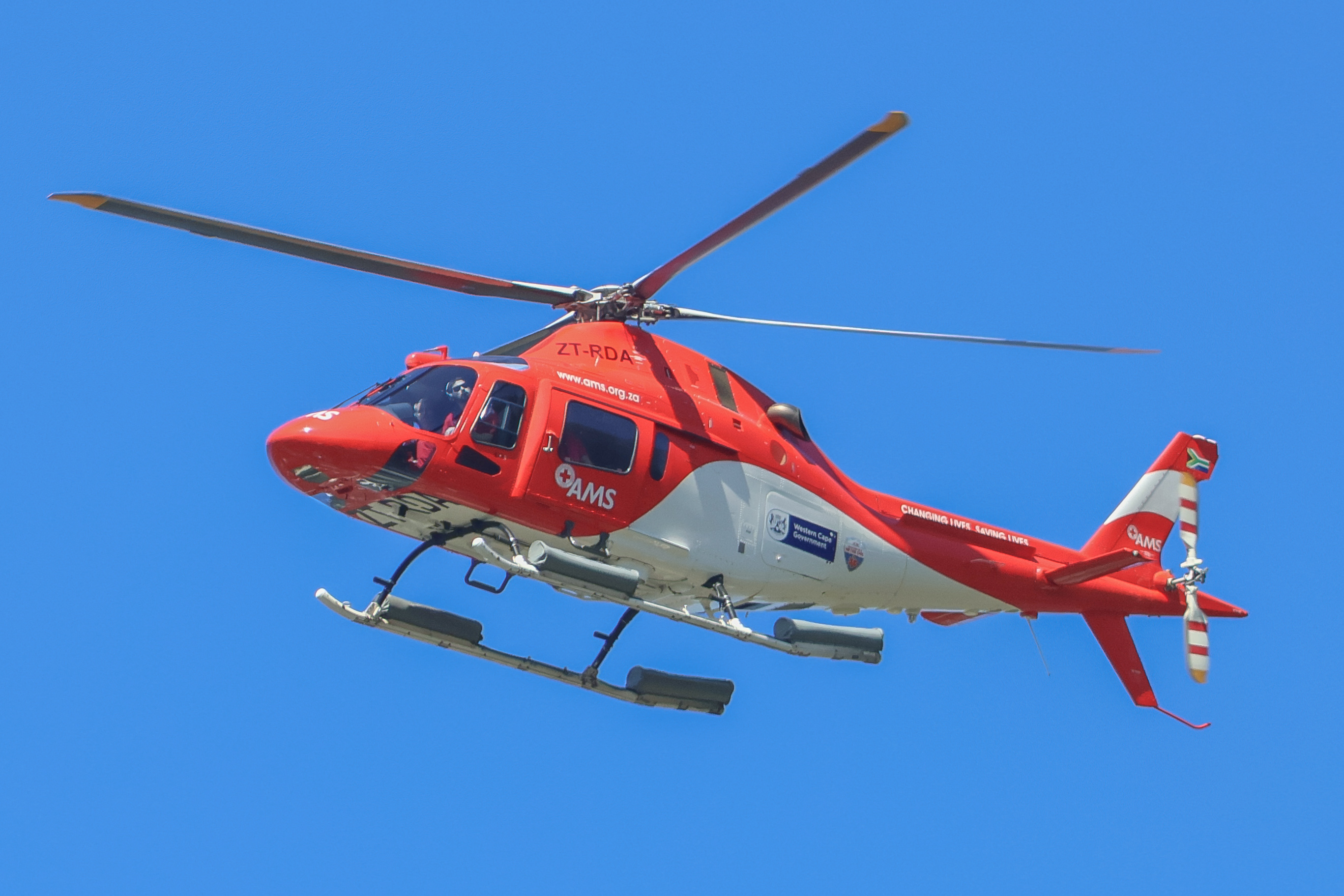
An AW119Ke of Air Mercy Services

Algeria

- Algerian Air Force

Argentina

- Argentine National Gendarmerie

Australia

- Westpac Rescue Helicopter Service

Bangladesh

- Bangladesh Air Force - 2 in service as of 2019, operated by the 18th Squadron Rotary Training wing .

Bosnia and Herzegovina

- Bosnia & Herzegovina Air Force - (6 on order)
- Helicopter Service of Republika Srpska

Brazil

- Federal Highway Police (6 on order)
- Brazilian Institute for the Environment and Renewable Natural Resources (7 delivered)
- State of Goiás
- State of Santa Catarina
- State of Rio Grande do Sul

Ecuador

- Ecuadorian Air Force - 3 delivered, 1 more on order as of April 2019.

Finland

- Finnish Border Guard - 4 in operation.

Israel

- Israeli Air Force (12 on order)

Italy

- Carabinieri (20 on order)

Latvia

- State Border Guard - 2 in operation

Malaysia

- Weststar General Aviation

Mexico

- Mexico State Government

Portugal

- Portuguese Air Force - 7 delivered

South Africa

- South African Red Cross Air Mercy Services

South Korea

- National Police Agency

Turkey

- Turkish Land Forces - 2 in service.(13 on order)

United States

- New York City Police Department (Replaced by Bell 429)
- Phoenix Police Department (Replaced by Airbus Helicopters H125)
- United States Navy - 68 on order; up to 130 planned
- University of New Mexico Hospital Lifeguard air ambulance
- Florida Forest Service - 5

== Specifications (AW119Kx) ==
External videos
- Pellissier Helicopter AW119Kx operations

Data from AgustaWestland AW119Kx brochure

General characteristics

- Crew: 1-2
- Capacity: 6-7 passengers or 1,400 kg (3,086 lb) sling load
- Length: 12.92 m (42 ft 5 in)
- Height: 3.60 m (11 ft 10 in)
- Empty weight: 1,483 kg (3,269 lb)
- Max takeoff weight: 2,850 kg (6,283 lb)
- Fuel capacity:
  3-cell fuel system 605 L (160 US gal)
  4-cell fuel system 711 L (188 US gal)
  5-cell fuel system 870 L (230 US gal)
- Powerplant: 1 × Pratt & Whitney Canada PT6B-37A turboshaft engine, 747 kW (1,002 hp) 917shp
- Main rotor diameter: 10.83 m (35 ft 6 in)
- Main rotor area: 92.1 m^{2} (991 sq ft)

Performance

- Cruise speed: 244 km/h (152 mph, 132 kn)
- Never exceed speed: 282 km/h (175 mph, 152 kn)
- Range: 954 km (593 mi, 515 nmi)
- Endurance: 5 h 20 min
- Service ceiling: 4,572 m (15,000 ft)
- Rate of climb: 9.1 m/s (1,790 ft/min)

== See also ==
Related development

- AgustaWestland AW109

Aircraft of comparable role, configuration, and era

- Bell 407
- Eurocopter AS350 Écureuil
- MD Helicopters MD 600

Related lists

- List of rotorcraft
