= Indian Rotorcraft =

India helicopters manufacture

- Industry: Aviation
- Founded: 2010
- Headquarters: Hyderabad, India
- Area served: Worldwide
- Products: helicopters, components
- Owner: Tata Sons, Leonardo S.p.A.

Indian Rotorcraft Limited (IRL) is a company specialising in the manufacture of helicopters within India for the global market. Established in 2010, it is operated as a joint venture between Indian conglomerate Tata Sons and Anglo-Italian defense company Leonardo S.p.A. Ground was broken on a dedicated facility at Rajiv Gandhi International Airport, Hyderabad in March 2012; its completion has been delayed reportedly due to protracted rulings from overseeing Indian government agencies.

== History ==
Indian Rotorcraft was founded upon a partnership agreement signed between Tata Sons and Anglo-Italian helicopter manufacturer AgustaWestland (a company which has since been integrated into Leonardo S.p.A. in 2016) during January 2010. At the time, India was viewed by helicopter manufacturers as one of the biggest potential growth markets. Speaking of the venture in 2012, Ratan Tata, chairman of Tata Sons, stated: "The project is integral to our plans in the aerospace sector and we look forward to an enduring and successful partnership with AgustaWestland."

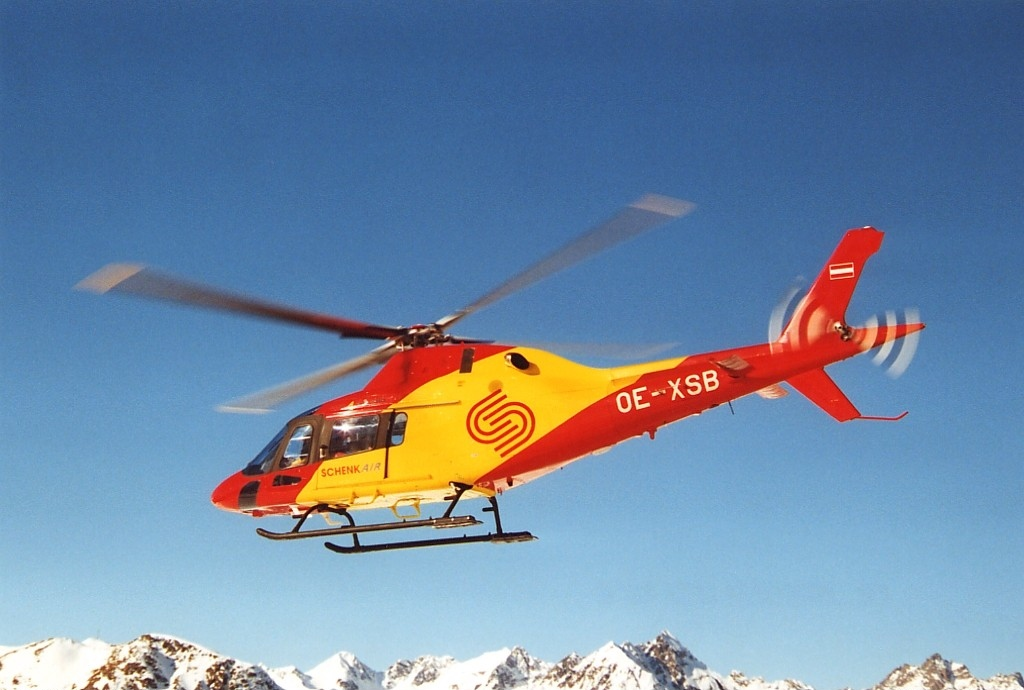
An AW119 helicopter

During March 2012, Indian Rotorcraft broke ground on a 40,000m2 new facility adjacent to Rajiv Gandhi International Airport, Hyderabad, India; once complete, this site, which includes a main assembly facility, flight hangar, offices and several helicopter landing pads, will accommodate the assembly, customisation and flight-testing of helicopters for the global market. The first helicopters to be manufactured by the joint venture is slated to be the AgustaWestland AW119Ke; other types, such as the AgustaWestland AW101, are likely to follow in the future. Tata have mooted plan to manufacture up to 80 per cent of the Sikorsky S-92 at the facility as well. In addition to whole rotorcraft, the joint venture shall also engage in the manufacture of components for various other military and commercial aircraft.

Assembly activity, which is to reportedly have the initial capacity to complete a maximum of 30 helicopters per year, was at one point slated to commence during April 2014. During summer 2015, it was reported that further delays to starting assembly were likely as the Foreign Investment Promotion Board (FIPB), an Indian government agency, repeatedly deferred a pending decision on the proposal. During September 2015, after two years of deferment, the proposal was at last cleared by the FIPB, allowing work to proceed; at the time, an Indian Rotorcraft spokesperson was unwilling to commit to a final timeframe for production rollout. However, during May 2016, another pending ruling by the FIPB was deferred without any stated reason; allegedly, the FIPB is liaising with the Indian Ministry of Defence on the matter. The Indian government's apparent hesitancy on the issue has been alleged to be linked to the 2013 Indian helicopter bribery scandal.
