= Bell ARH-70 Arapaho =

Armed reconnaissance helicopter prototype

ARH-70 Arapaho
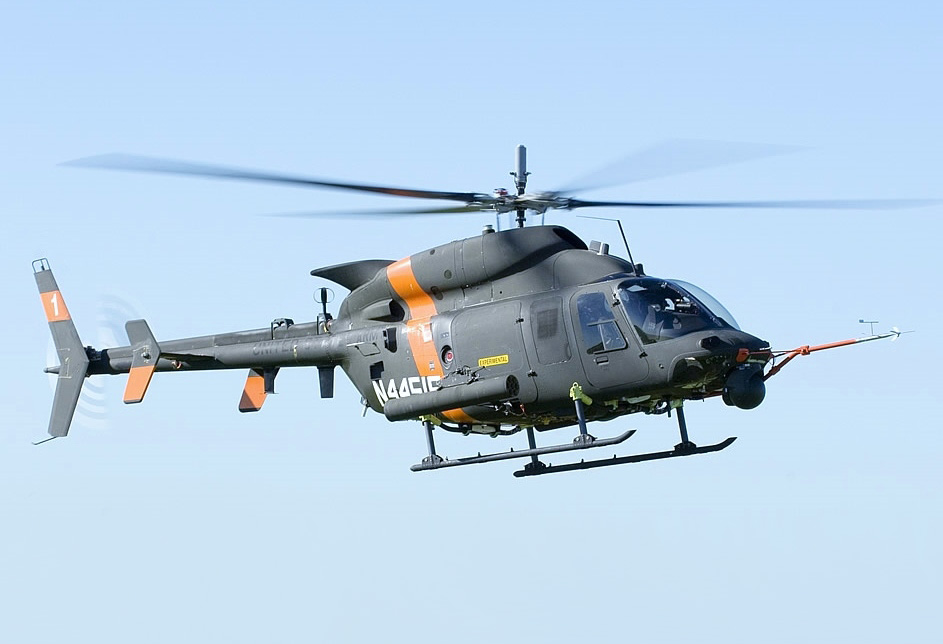
- An ARH-70 Arapaho

General information
- Type: Reconnaissance armed helicopter
- Manufacturer: Bell Helicopter
- Status: Canceled
- Number built: Four (prototypes)

History
- First flight: 20 July 2006
- Developed from: Bell 407

The Bell ARH-70 Arapaho was an American four-bladed, single-engine, light military helicopter designed for the United States Army's Armed Reconnaissance Helicopter (ARH) program. With a crew of two and optimized for urban combat, the ARH-70 was slated to replace the Army's aging OH-58D Kiowa Warrior.

Excessive delays and growth in program costs forced its cancellation on 16 October 2008, when the Department of Defense failed to certify the program to Congress. The ARH-70 was touted as having been built with off-the-shelf technology, the airframe being based on the Bell 407 (and as such was related to the OH-58).

== Development ==
=== Background and Armed Reconnaissance Helicopter competition ===
The Boeing–Sikorsky RAH-66 Comanche helicopter program was canceled by the U.S. Army on 23 February 2004. The cancellation was a result of a six-month study which recommended canceling the program before the Comanche reached production, after 20 years and development costs of over US$6.9 billion. The study estimated that the Army would save US$14 billion with the cancellation, which could then be used to update and replace the aging airframes of the Army's helicopter fleet. The study targeted the OH-58D Kiowa Warrior for replacement based on the age of the airframes, recent losses, and a lack of replacement airframes.

Army officials issued a request for proposals (RFP) for the replacement aircraft as the Armed Reconnaissance Helicopter (ARH) on 9 December 2004. The Army's concept would use commercial off-the-shelf (COTS) technology, with the goal of an operational unit of 30 helicopters and eight trainers ready by September 2008. Two companies submitted bids:

- Boeing proposed the upgraded version of the MH-6 Little Bird, the MH-6M Mission Enhanced Little Bird (MELB). Because the aircraft was already in service with the 160th Special Operations Aviation Regiment, it became the predictive favorite despite doubts that MD Helicopters Inc. (MDHI) could ramp up production to meet the contract's demands. To alleviate this concern, Boeing purchased the production rights for the design and served as the prime contractor.

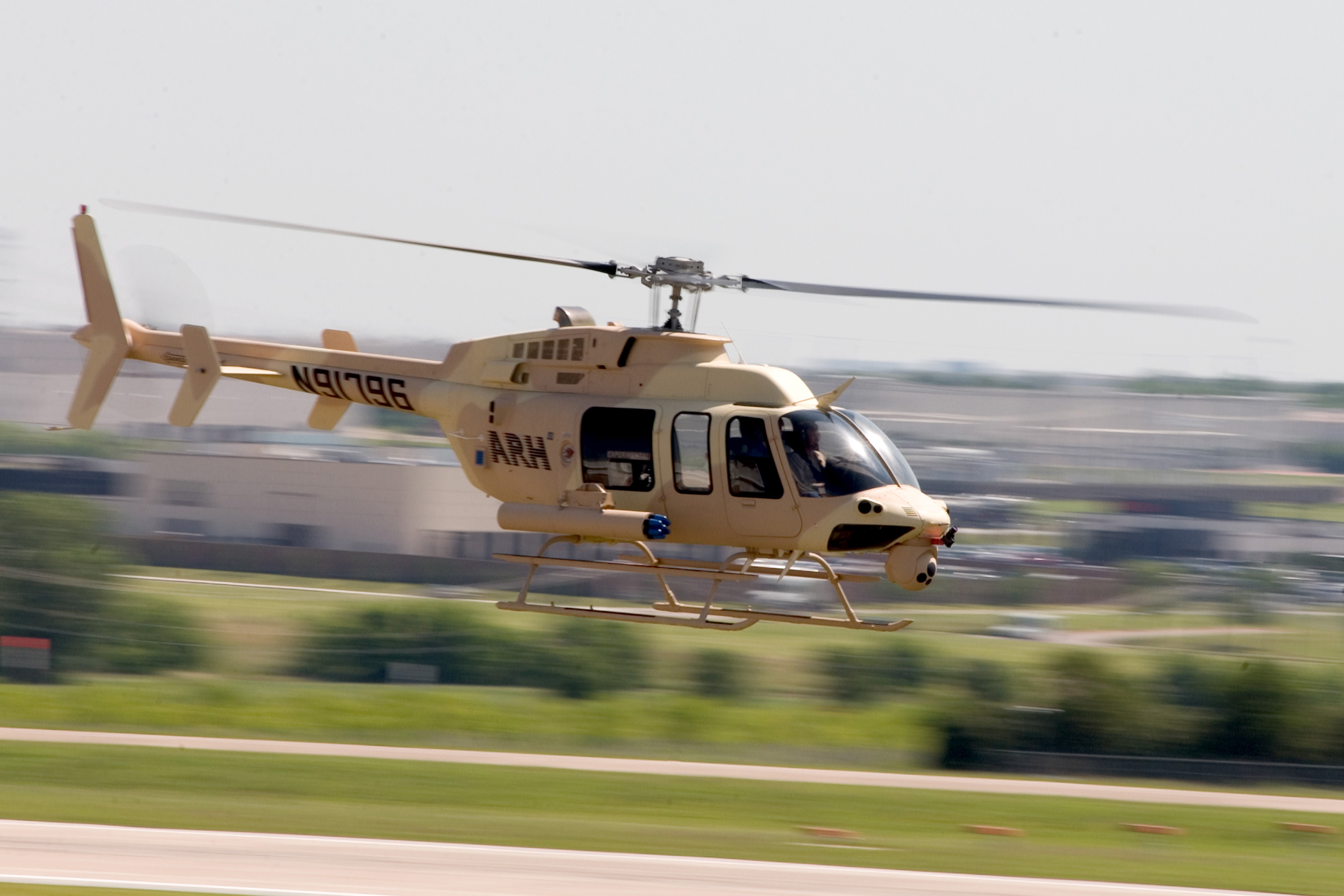
A Bell 407 being used for early development of the ARH-70

- Bell Helicopter proposed an update of the OH-58D concept in a militarized version of the Bell 407, using a more powerful Honeywell HTS900 turboshaft engine, an all-composite main rotor based on the Bell 430's rotor, and the Bell 427 tail assembly.

The Army announced Bell as the winner of a contract for 368 helicopters on 29 July 2005. There was some confusion as Bell figures placed the contract value at US$2.2 billion while Army estimates were over US$3 billion, compared to its earlier estimate of US$2.36 billion. The contract called for the development of prototypes and the delivery of preproduction aircraft to the Army for the Limited User Test (LUT), with the first unit equipped by the end of September 2008.

=== Flight testing ===
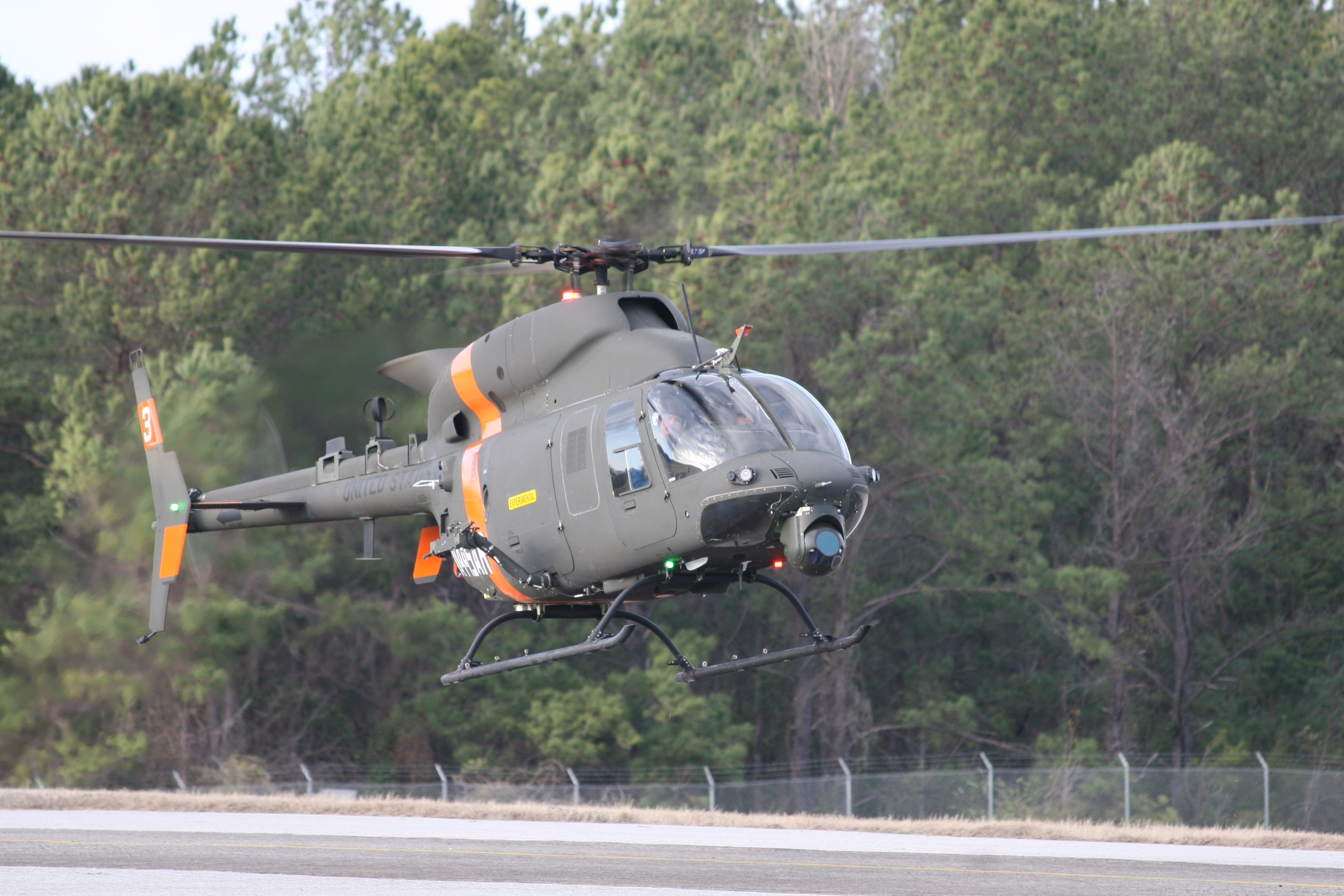
Unarmed training prototype, January 2008

Bell's ARH demonstrator, a modified Bell 407 (s/n 53343/N91796), first flew on 3 June 2005. In February 2006, the ARH demonstrator flew with a limited avionics and Mission Equipment Package (MEP), and in April Bell fitted and mounted the Honeywell HTS900-2 engine to the demonstrator airframe, followed by a series of ground runs. The first flight was delayed, first in March and then in May, to allow Bell to configure the prototypes as preproduction aircraft. Bell and the Army both eventually agreed that this delay would be essential for maintaining the compressed timeline for development. The ARH-70's maiden flight occurred on 20 July 2006, at Bell's XworX facility in Arlington, Texas.

On 21 February 2007, during its first flight, prototype #4 (s/n 53906/N445HR) suffered a loss of engine power, due to fuel starvation, and made an autorotational landing at a nearby golf course. The aircraft was damaged beyond repair when it rolled over during the landing; the test pilots survived and were uninjured.

=== Program cost increases and cancellation ===
A month later, on 22 March 2007, the Army issued a "Stop Work" notice, giving Bell 30 days to present a plan to get the ARH program back on track. Previous estimates for the System Development Demonstration portion of the program had grown from $210 million to over $300 million. Textron, Bell's parent company, notified investors that they could lose $2–4 million on each aircraft under the contract. Bell appealed and received permission to continue development using company funds until the notice was resolved. On 18 May 2007, the Army approved continuation of the ARH program.

The House Appropriations Committee's Defense panel drafted a bill for the 2008 Defense Budget which zeroed out funding for ARH-70 production, citing Bell's inability to enter production, but continued funding for research and development. However, government officials began working on export policy to allow international sales of the ARH-70. Including the U.S. Army's expected total of 512 helicopters, orders were anticipated to total over 1,000. The Army filed a Nunn-McCurdy cost and schedule breach on 9 July 2008, when new cost estimates showed a 40% cost increase above initial estimates. In August 2008, the Army requested that Bell cease recruitment for the ARH-70 program pending the outcome of the review.

On 16 October 2008, the Army's Acquisition Executive Office for Aviation directed that the ARH contract be terminated completely for the convenience of the government. The cancellation was the result of the United States Department of Defense (DOD) not certifying the US$6.2 billion ARH-70 program to Congress. John Young, the Undersecretary of Defense for Acquisition, Technology and Logistics, cited the reason as excessive costs of the program which had increased over 70 percent with an estimated per-unit cost of US$14.5 million, up from US$8.5 million.

Although the ARH-70 was not procured by the US, the Iraqi Air Force bought Bell 407 armed scouts in a similar configuration as the ARH starting in 2009. There are 30 in service; 24 armed scouts, three gunships, and three trainers as of 2013.

== Specifications (ARH-70) ==
Data from Bell ARH-70, Bell 407'

General characteristics

- Crew: two pilots
- Capacity: six passengers and 1,868 lb (847 kg) useful load
- Length: 34 ft 8 in (10.57 m)
- Height: 11 ft 8 in (3.56 m)
- Empty weight: 2,598 lb (1,178 kg)
- Gross weight: 5,000 lb (2,268 kg)
- Max takeoff weight: 5,000 lb (2,268 kg)
- Powerplant: 1 × Honeywell HTS900-2 turboshaft, 970 shp (723 kW)
- Main rotor diameter: 35 ft 0 in (10.67 m)
- Main rotor area: 962 sq ft (89 m^{2})

Performance

- Maximum speed: 140 kn (161 mph, 259 km/h)
- Cruise speed: 113 kn (130 mph, 209 km/h)
- Range: 162 nmi (186 mi, 300 km)
- Service ceiling: 20,000 ft (6,096 m)

Armament

- Guns: 1× GAU-19 .50 in (12.7 mm) Gatling gun
- Rockets: Hydra 70 2.75 in (70 mm) rockets

== See also ==
- U.S. helicopter armament subsystems
- United States Army Aviation and Missile Command

Related development

- Bell OH-58 Kiowa
- Bell 407

Aircraft of comparable role, configuration, and era

- Boeing MH-6M MELB
