= Honeywell HTS900 =

Turboshaft engine

HTS900
- Type: Turboshaft
- National origin: United States
- Manufacturer: Honeywell Aerospace
- Major applications: Bell ARH-70 Arapaho; Kopter AW09
- Developed from: Lycoming LTS101

The Honeywell HTS900 is an American turboshaft engine produced by Honeywell Aerospace. A growth version of the LTS101 which it is designed to replace, the HTS900 is in the 1,000 shp (745 kW) class.

At the October 2018 NBAA convention, it was shown with two 200 kW (270 hp) electric generators for hybrid electric aircraft, and it can be developed up to 1 MW (1,300 hp), targeting a conversion efficiency of 98%.

== Applications ==
- Bell ARH-70 Arapaho
- Kopter AW09
- XTI TriFan 600

== Specifications (HTS900) ==
Data from FAA TCDS

==== General characteristics ====
- Type: Free turbine turboshaft
- Length: 36.3 in (920 mm)
- Diameter: 25.5 in (650 mm)
- Dry weight: 338 lb (153 kg)

==== Components ====
- Compressor: two-stage centrifugal
- Combustors: reverse-flow annular
- Turbine: single-stage gas producer + single-stage power

==== Performance ====
- Maximum power output: 820 hp (610 kW) (Takeoff, 6,317 rpm output, 47,870 rpm gas producer)
- Power-to-weight ratio: 2.43 hp/lb (3.99 kW/kg)
- Control system: FADEC: dual channel ECU + electromechanical backup

== See also ==
Related development

- Lycoming LTS101

Related lists

- List of aircraft engines
