= South African Red Cross Air Mercy Service =

Ambulance service in South Africa

IATA	ICAO	Call sign
—	AMD	MERCYWINGS
- Founded: 1966
- Headquarters: Cape Town International Airport, Cape Town, Western Cape, South Africa
- Website: ams.org.za

South African Red Cross Air Mercy Service also known as AMS is an air ambulance service headquartered at Cape Town International Airport with various bases in South Africa.

== Bases ==
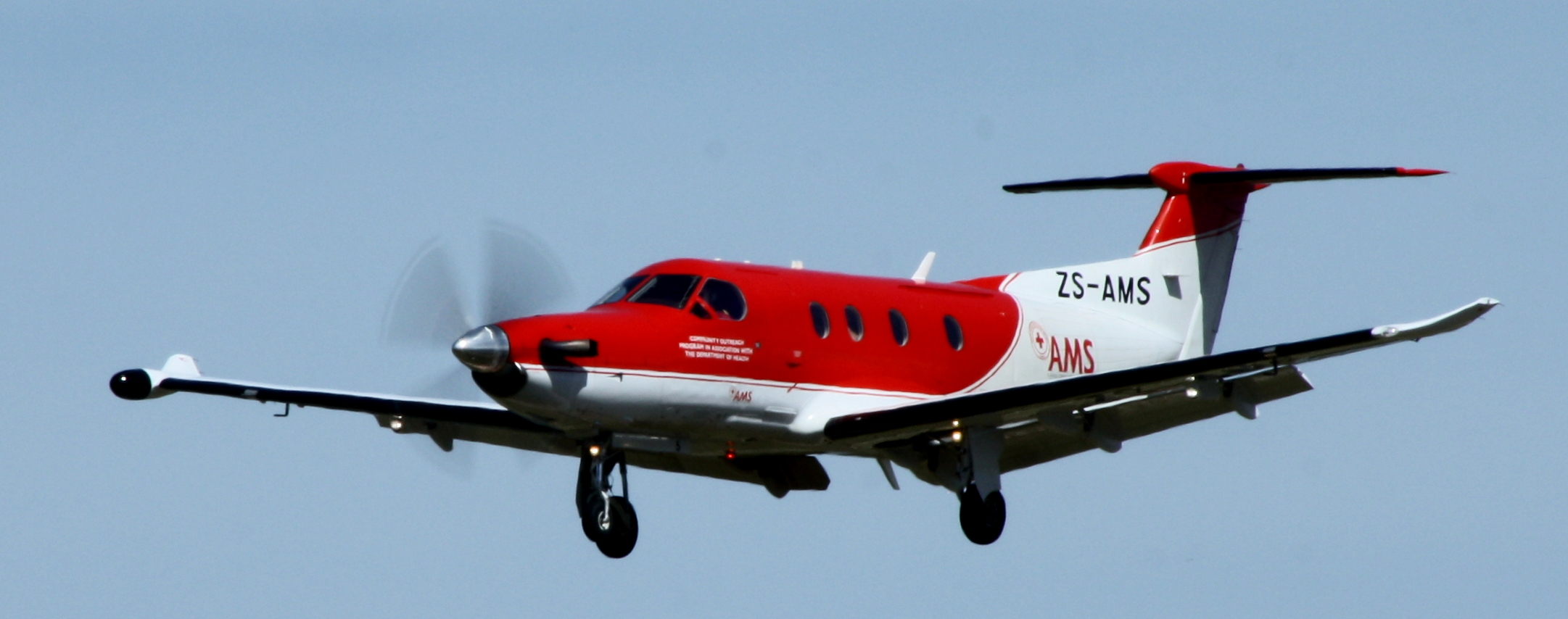
AMS Pilatus PC-12 at George Airport (2013)

The SA Red Cross Air Mercy Service has bases at the following locations:

- Cape Town - Cape Town International Airport
- Oudtshoorn - Oudtshoorn Airport
- Durban - King Shaka International Airport
- Richards Bay - Richards Bay Airport
- Polokwane - Polokwane International Airport

== History ==
The SA Red Cross Air Ambulance Service was started in 1966 with a single Cessna 205 aircraft to provide a service for the transportation of critically ill and injured persons from the remote areas of South Africa.

In 1971 the service acquired an additional aircraft, a Piper Aztec, nicknamed the "Spirit of Rotary I". The funding or this aircraft was achieved through the assistance of the Rotary Club. In November 1982 the "Spirit of Rotary II", a Piper Chieftain took off from the then called DF Malan Airport in Cape Town. 1988 the service acquired its first jet aircraft, a Cessna Citation II.

In 1994 a trust was formed and the organization changed its name to the present South African Red Cross Air Mercy Service Trust.

== Fleet ==
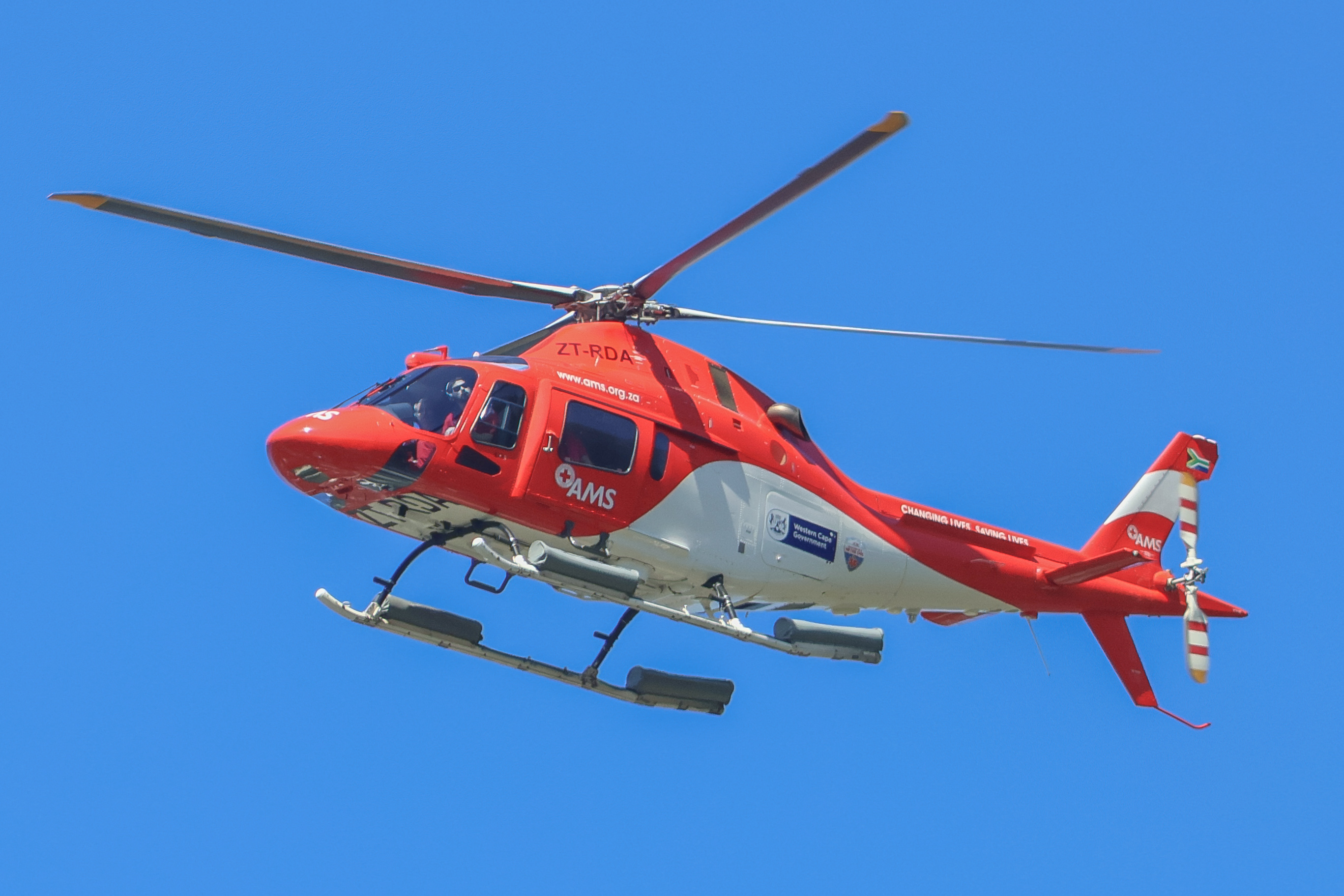
AMS Agusta Westland AW119 Koala during training near Newlands Forest.

The South African Red Cross Air Mercy Service fleet comprises the following fixed and rotorwing aircraft:

SA Red Cross AMS Fleet
Aircraft	In Fleet
AgustaWestland AW109	1
AgustaWestland AW119 Koala	4
Eurocopter EC130	3
Pilatus PC-12	7
Total	15
