= HeliRussia =

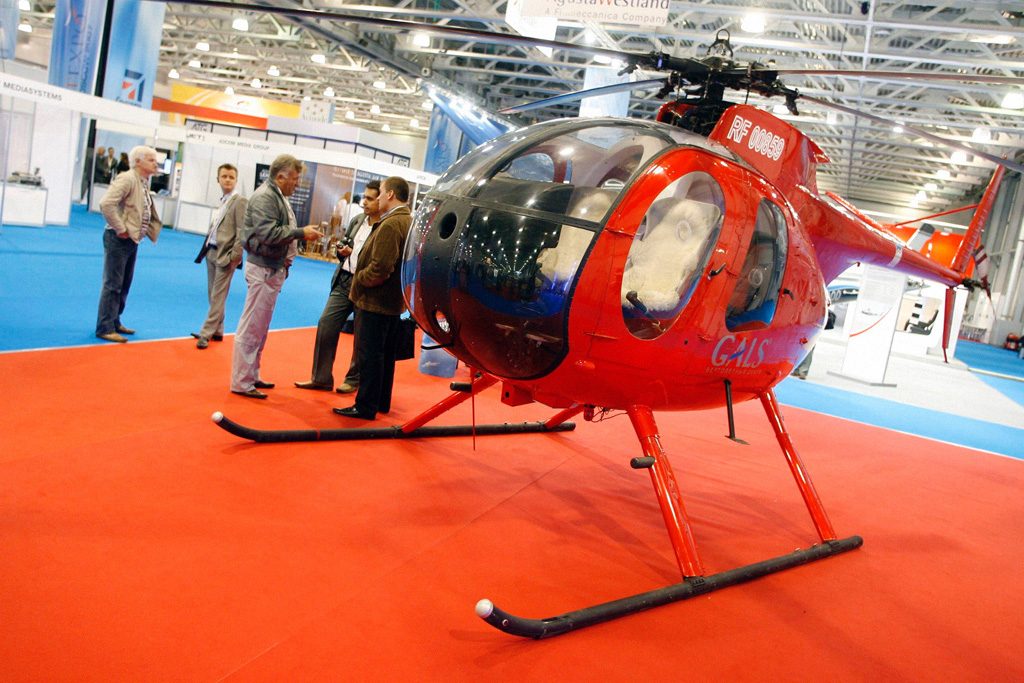
- A helicopter MD 500 at the 2nd International Business Aviation Exhibition Jet Expo 2007, Crocus-Expo
- Status: Active
- Genre: Exhibition
- Begins: May 19, 2022
- Ends: May 21, 2022
- Frequency: Annually
- Venue: Crocus Expo International Exhibition Center
- Locations: Krasnogorsk, Moscow, Russia
- Coordinates: 55.822686°N 37.388425°E
- Inaugurated: May 15, 2008; 18 years ago
- Participants: 212
- Attendance: 10,000+
- Area: Worldwide
- Organiser: Ministry of Industry and Trade of the Russian Federation
- Website: www.helirussia.ru/en/

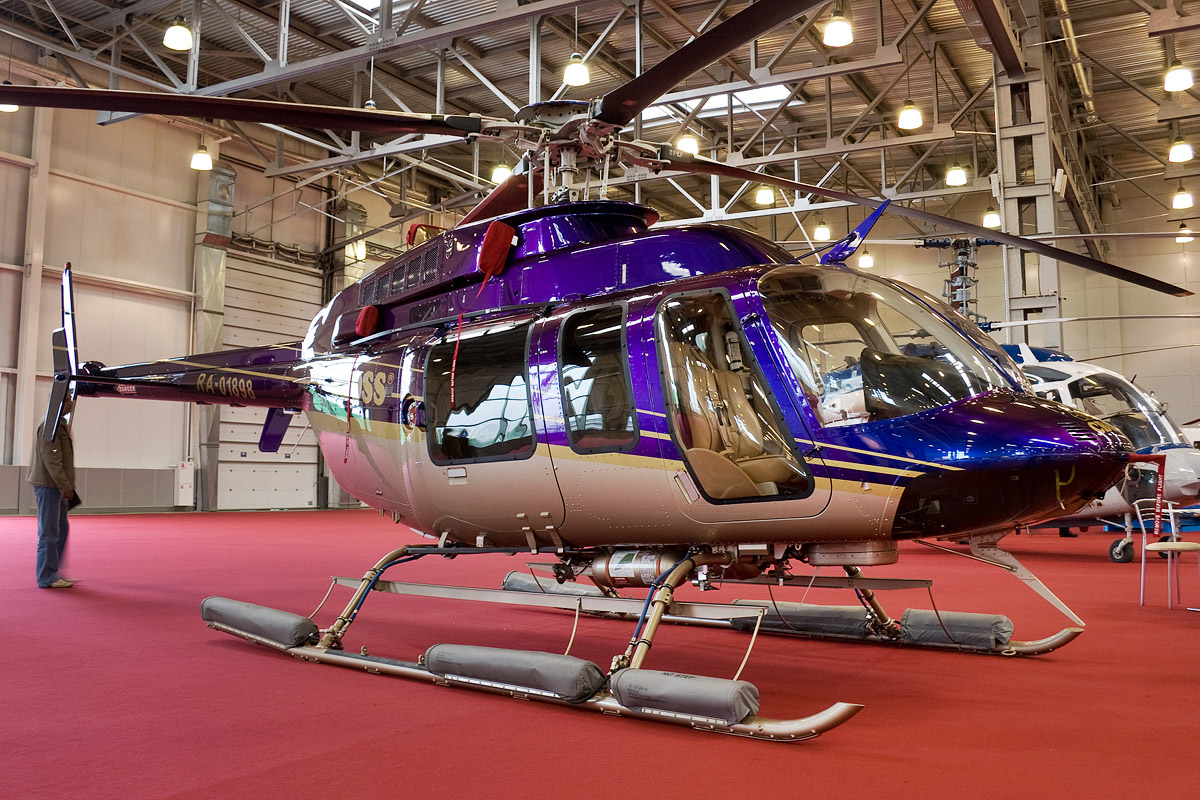
Bell 407, HeliRussia 2009

HeliRussia is Russia's first International exhibition of Helicopter Industry held in Moscow, Russia at Crocus Expo exhibition center. The first show, HeliRussia 2008, was held on May 15–17, 2008.
