= Wire strike protection system =

Equipment for protecting helicopters from wire strikes

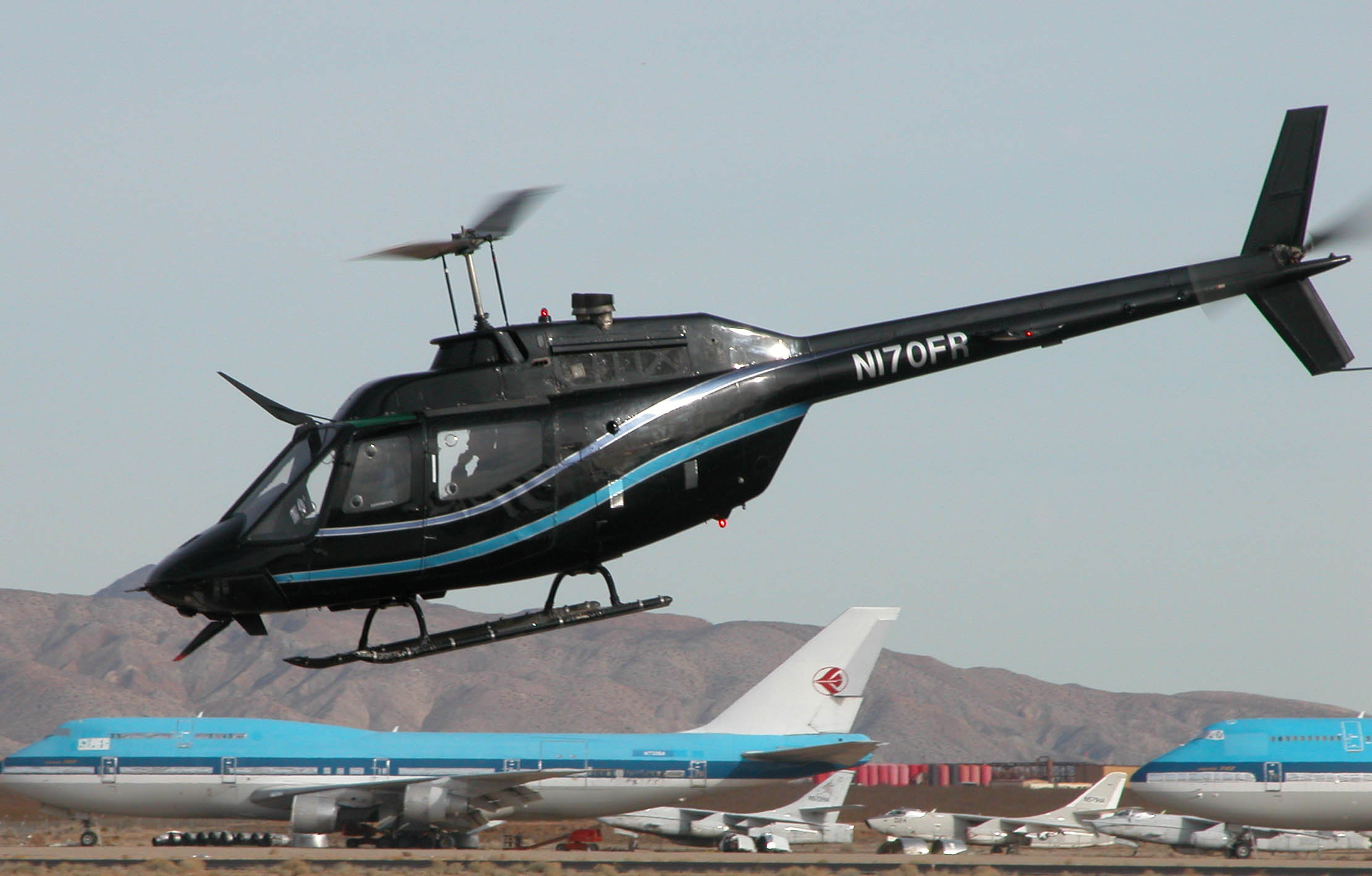
A Bell 206 shows cutters above and below cockpit section of WSPS.

The wire strike protection system (WSPS) consists of guides and a passive mechanical wire cutter designed to mitigate the risk of wire strikes while flying helicopters at low level.

== History ==
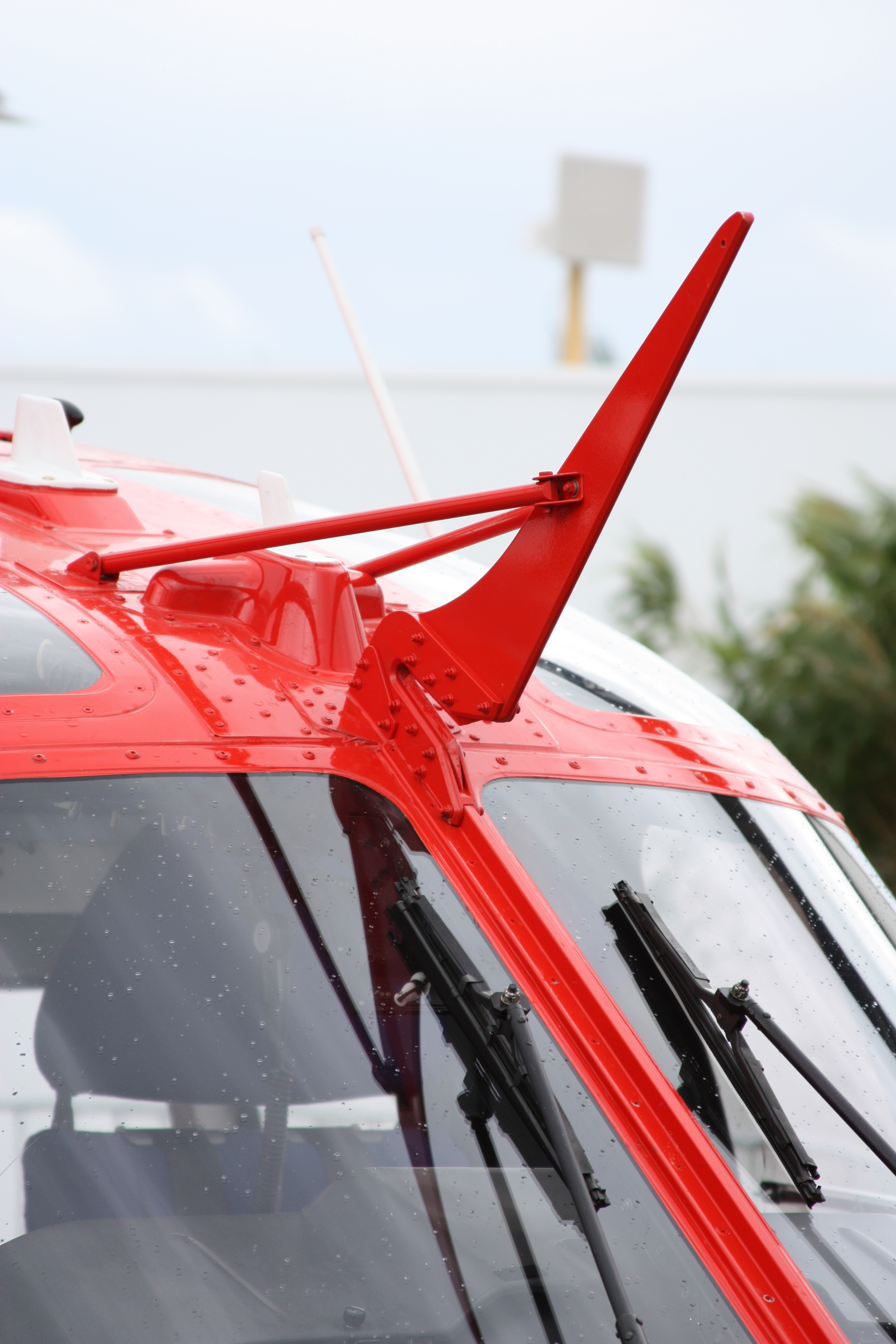
Upper WSPS cutter

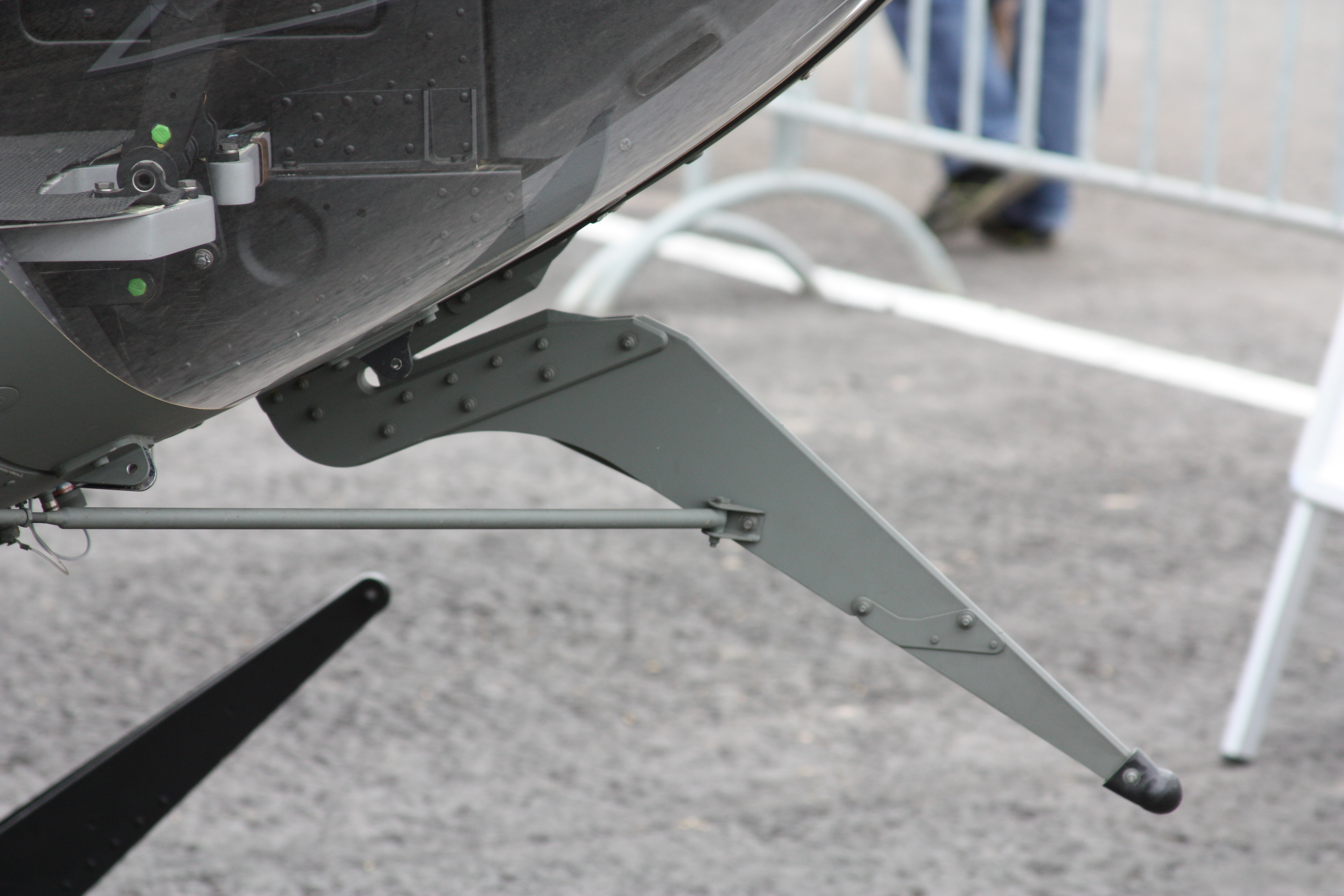
Lower WSPS cutter

The wedge shape and reinforced windshield strip direct the wire to the sharpened cutter blades.

Between 1974 and 1979 wire strike accidents accounted for 8% of United States Army Aviation aircraft damage, 6% of aircraft-related injuries, and 16% of aircraft-related fatalities. For the ten years from 1970, 208 civil helicopters were also involved in wire strike accidents; 88 were destroyed (42%) and 37 (11%) of the 331 people involved were killed. The commonest cause of civil helicopter aerial accidents between 1975 and 1977 was striking wires and poles. Bristol Aerospace developed a WSPS qualified for the Bell OH-58 Kiowa under contract to the Canadian Armed Forces in May 1979. Nelson Chan invented WSPS, and was granted patents in 1980. Bristol staged a series of 52 tests of the WSPS by mounting it on the fuselage of a wrecked Kiowa; the fuselage was loaded onto a flatbed truck and driven into wires at speeds ranging from 15 to 60 mph (13 to 52 kn; 24 to 97 km/h), yaw angles ranging from 0 to 45°, and a variety of cables that were typically used in overhead power and telecommunication transmission lines, including a 3/8 in (9.5 mm) 7-strand steel cable with a tensile strength exceeding 10,000 lb (4,500 kg).

Because the Bristol testing did not determine the effectiveness of the lower fuselage-mounted cutter, and was a ground-based test that did not evaluate how a wire strike with the cutter would affect aircraft attitude during flight, the United States Army Research Laboratory conducted supplemental pendulum swing tests at the Impact Dynamics Research Facility located at Langley Research Center with a Kiowa in October 1979. An additional deflector to protect the skids, landing gear, and tail boom (including the rotor and vertical stabilizer) was also tested, but was found to be ineffective.

During the Langley tests, an OH-58 was attached to the end of a 196-foot (60 m) long cable, pulled back, and released to swing through wires mounted horizontally at a height of approximately 22 feet (6.7 m). Similar pendulum tests were subsequently performed at Langley for Bell UH-1H and AH-1S helicopters in 1981 and 1982.

All small to medium (Note: OH-58, UH-1, OH-6, AH-1, UH-60 and AH-64) United States Army helicopters were fitted with WSPS in a retrofit programme that was completed in 1992; between 1996 and 2002 the US Army had no fatal wire strike accidents. In civil helicopter operations, wire cutters were thought to be most effective for agricultural flights. Of the 208 wire strike accidents in the 1970s, almost half could have been avoided with wire cutters and other recommended mechanical upgrades.

== Description ==
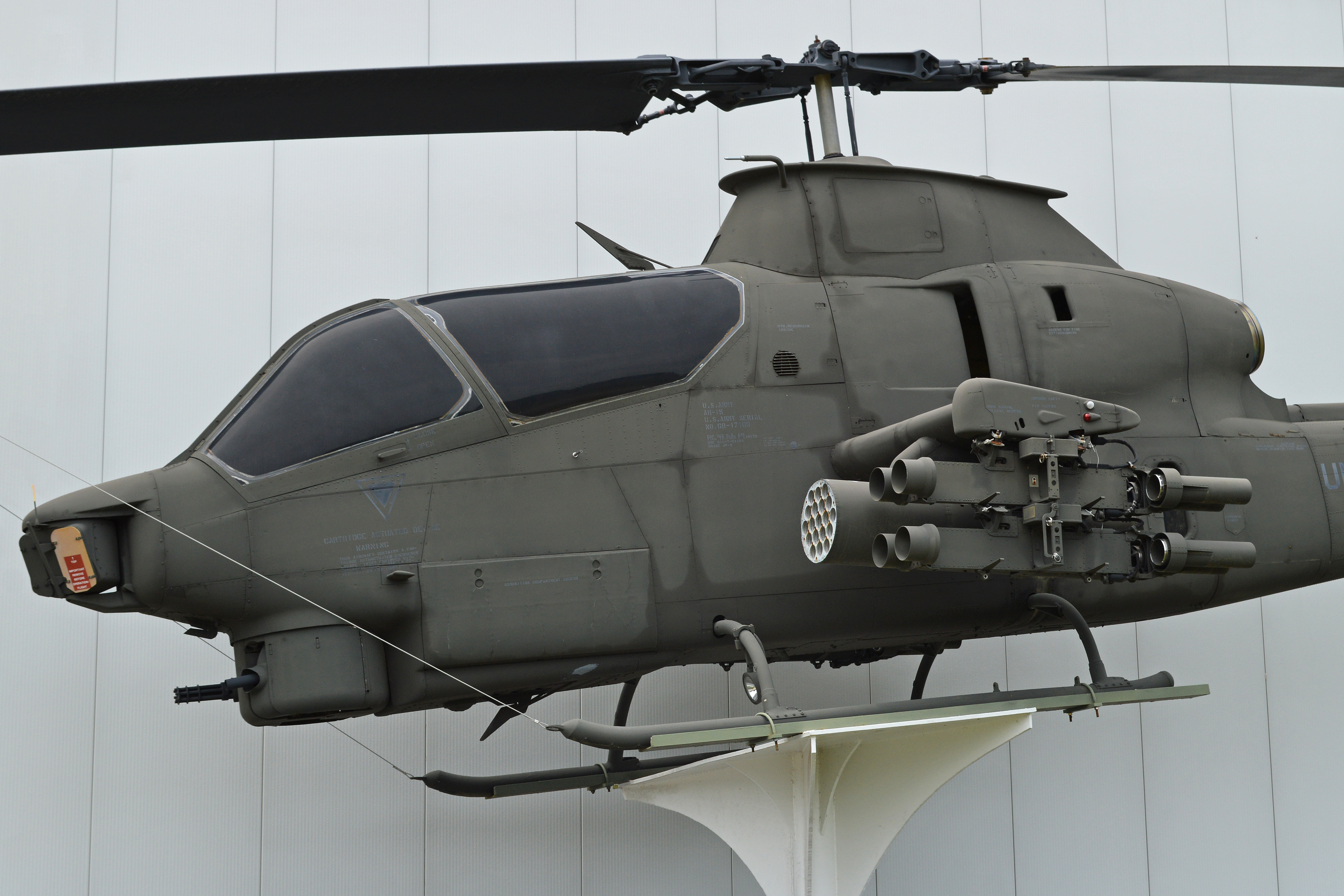
An AH-1S showing the cutters above and behind the cockpit and below the fuselage. It also has an additional cutter between the nose radar and front gun turret.

The system is typically mounted around the front of American military helicopters, rescue helicopters and of civilian helicopters involved in agricultural work. It is effective when the helicopter strikes the wires at angle of less than 90 degrees and at speeds more than 30 knots (35 mph; 56 km/h). The system is designed to cut a 3/8-inch (9.5 mm) steel cable with a breaking strength of 12,000 lb (5,400 kg).

The WSPS developed by Bristol, which is typical of most cable cutters, consists of a roof-mounted cutter, a lower cutter fitted to the fuselage, (Note: multiple fuselage cutters can be used) and a deflector fitted to the middle of the windshield to guide the cable into the cutters. Sometimes a windshield wiper protector frame is used to stop the cables from catching on wiper motor shafts. As installed, the OH-58 WSPS developed by Bristol weighs 16.3 lb (7.4 kg) and requires 40 man-hours to install.

Wire Strike Protection System is a registered trademark of Magellan Aerospace, the parent company of Bristol via acquisition. Dart Aerospace markets an equivalent apparatus under the name Cable Cutter System. Cable cutting systems to protect helicopters have been developed by other manufacturers, including MD Helicopters (1981), Custom Air (1987), Airbus Helicopters (2008 and 2011), and Bell Helicopter (2014). Another invention aims to protect the rotor by equipping the control rods with cutting edges.

== See also ==
- Wire catcher (used on jeeps)
