= Wire catcher =

Protective device for personnel in military vehicles

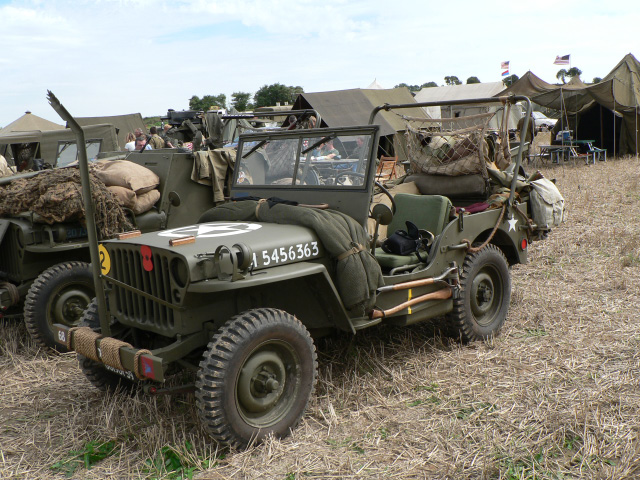
1945 Willys Jeep with wire catcher

A wire catcher (also known as Wire Cutter or Wire Anti-Decapitation Device) is a device used to protect military personnel in open vehicles against taut-wire traps.

== Design ==
A wire catcher consists of a strip of angle iron bolted upright to the forward bumper of a Jeep. "It extends above the heads of those riding in the jeep, and is notched a few inches from the top so that any wire extending across the road will be caught and snipped."

== History ==
The first land vehicle wire cutter to be demonstrated was attached to a Killen-Strait tractor for the British in 1915. Two scissor-like Royal Navy torpedo net cutters were fitted to the front of the tractor at the end of two protruding shaped metal rods. The tractor was driven into a field of tensioned barbed wire that had been strung up at precisely the cutter's height. It was not effective with wire at different heights and was not put into service. Heavy tanks were used simply to crush barbed wire obstacles instead.

During World War II, the Germans employed taut-wire traps strung across roadways designed to harm enemy soldiers riding in open vehicles such as jeeps and motorcycles. Wire catchers were installed on jeeps as field modifications.

Wire catchers were used up through the Vietnam War.

== Gallery ==
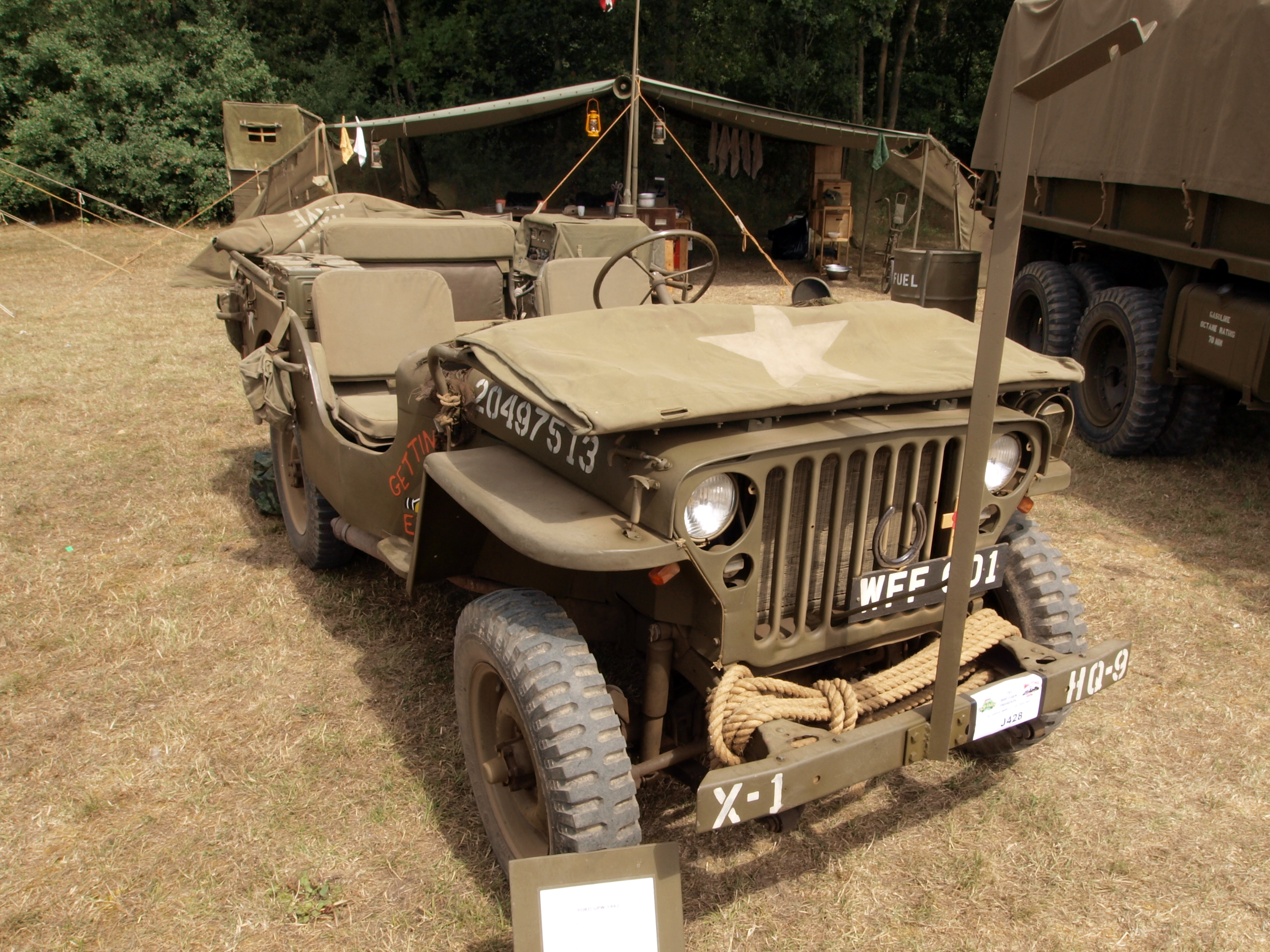
1942 Ford GPW Jeep with wire catcher

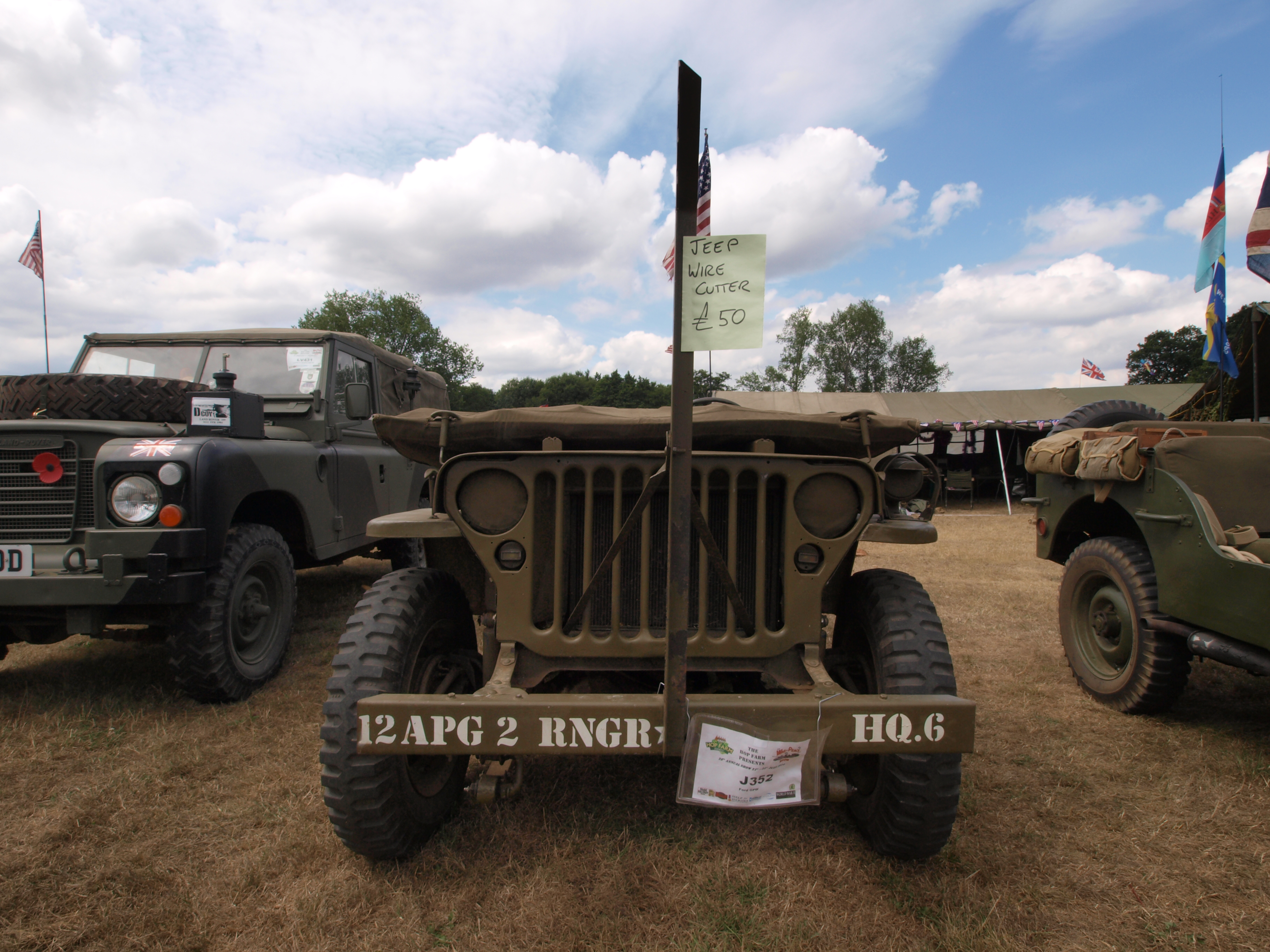
1944 Ford GPW Jeep with wire catcher

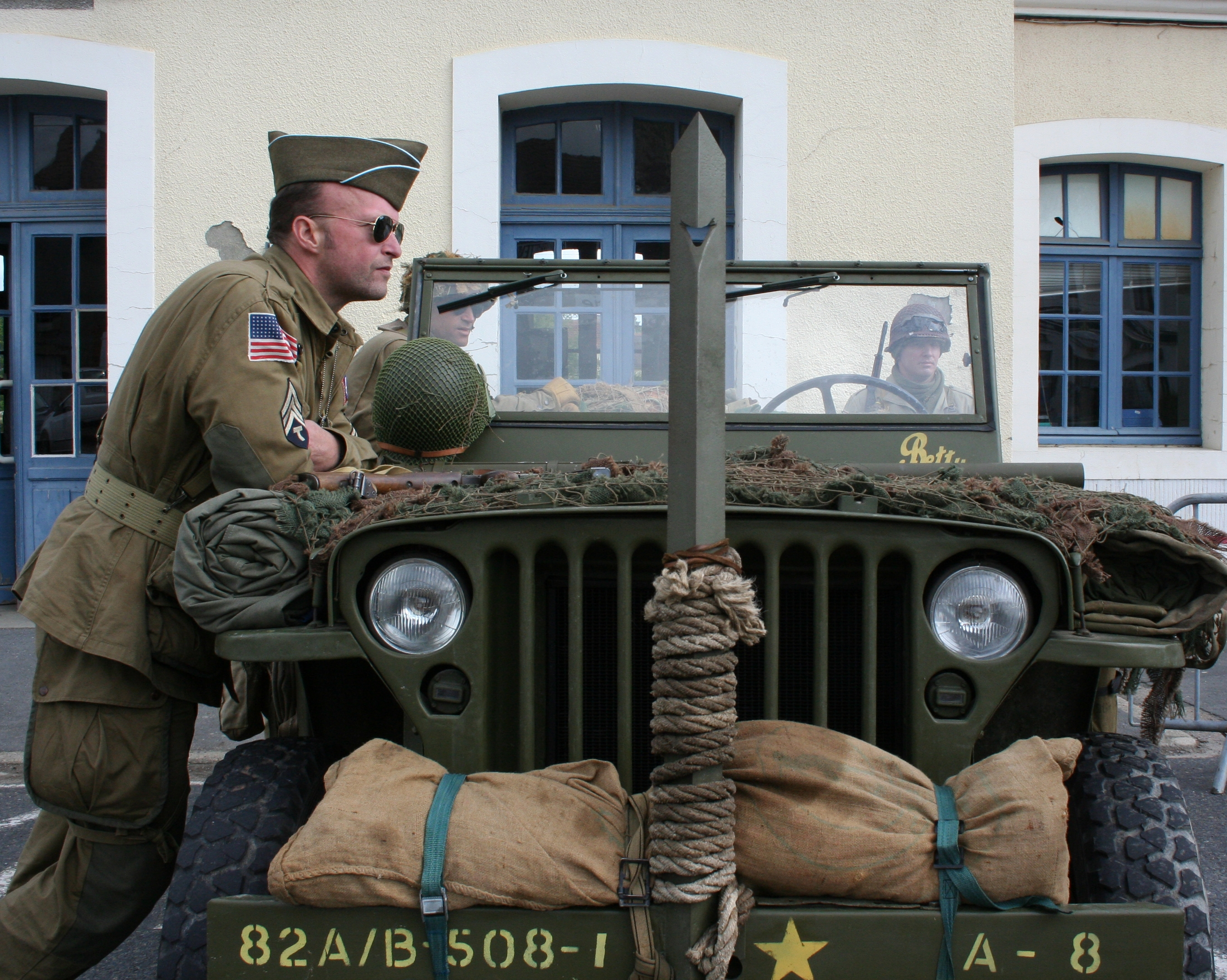
Willys MB Jeep with wire catcher

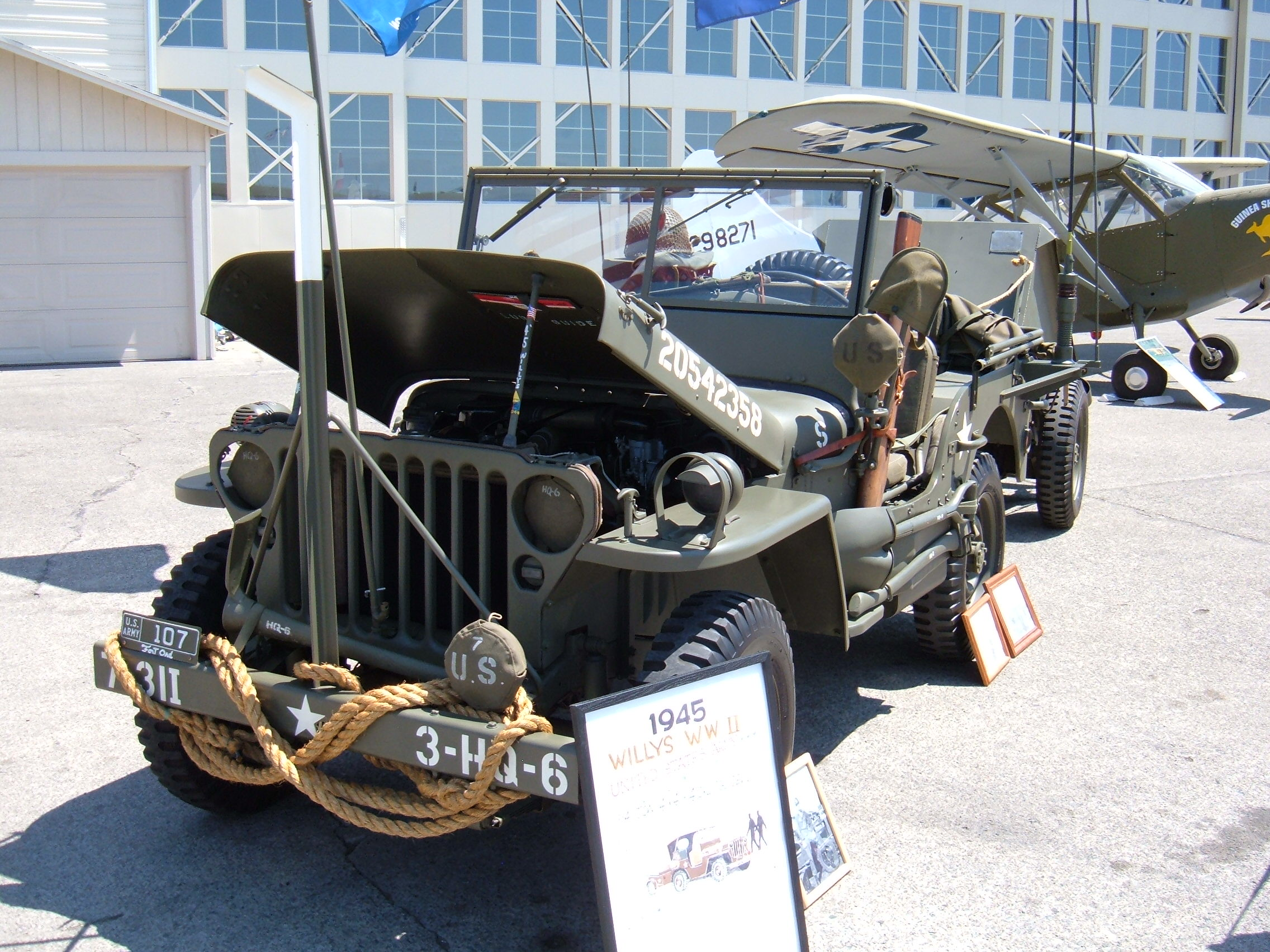
1945 Willys MB Jeep with wire catcher

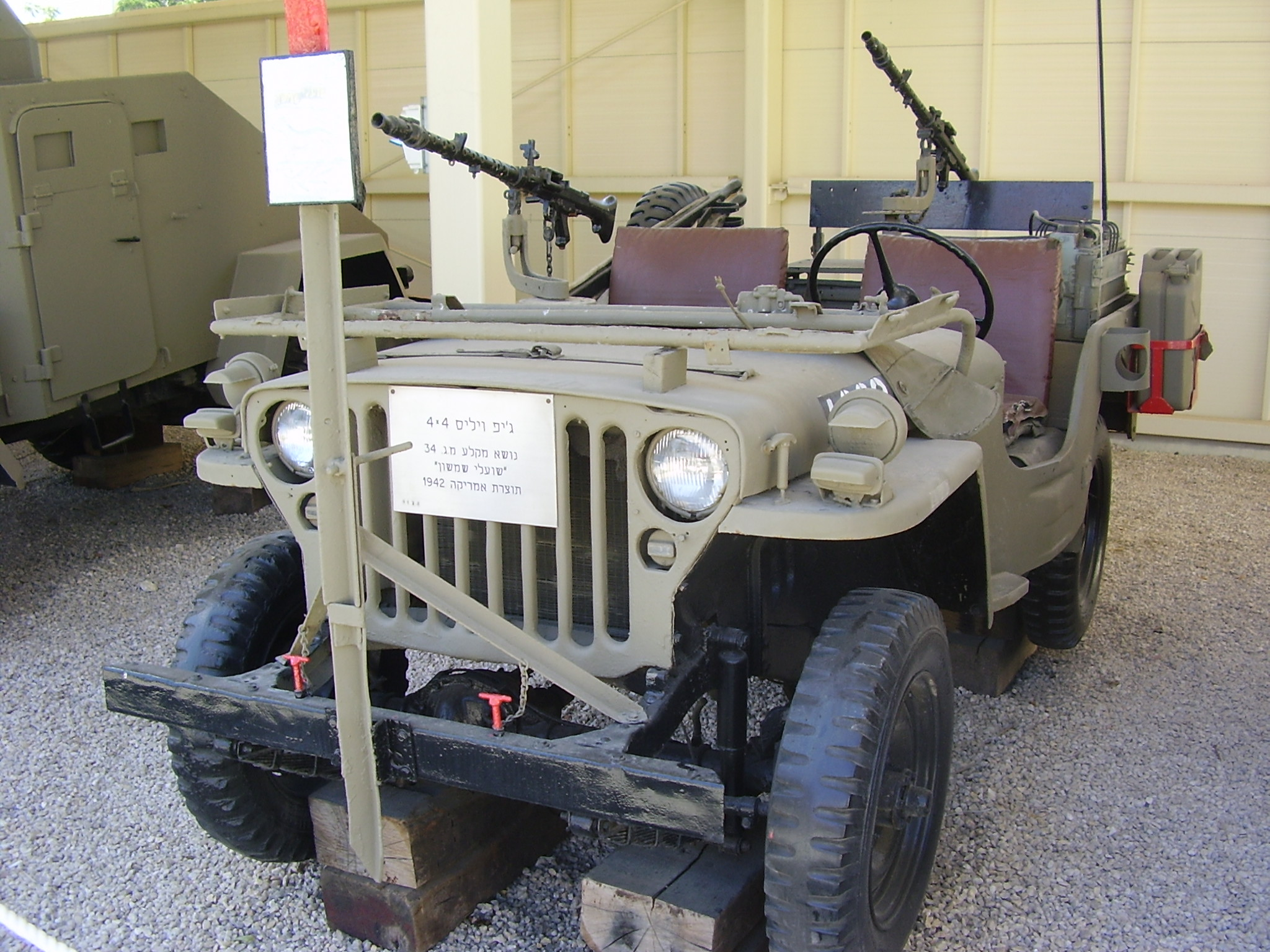
Willys MB Jeep with wire catcher used by the Samson's Foxes during the 1948 Arab–Israeli War

== See also ==
- Rhino tank (with Culin hedgerow cutter)
- Wire strike protection system
