= Bell OH-58 Kiowa =

1967 scout helicopter series by Bell Helicopter

OH-58 Kiowa
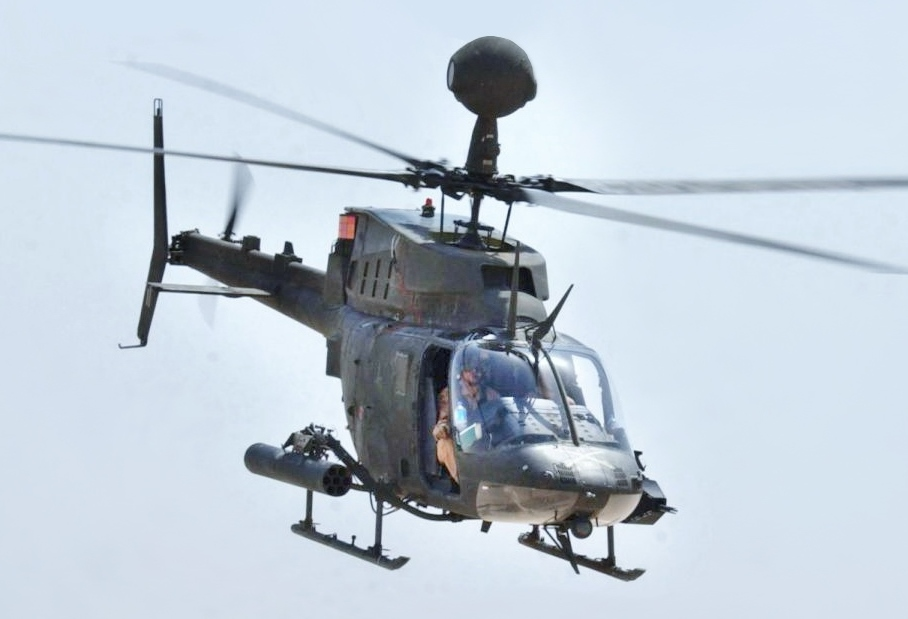
- An OH-58D Kiowa Warrior taking off from Forward Operation Base MacKenzie during the Iraq War in 2004

General information
- Type: Observation and reconnaissance helicopter
- National origin: United States
- Manufacturer: Bell Helicopter
- Status: In service
- Primary users: United States Army (historical) Republic of China Army; Royal Saudi Land Forces; Hellenic Army
- Number built: 2,325 plus 58 206B-1

History
- Manufactured: 1966–1989 (Note: The last new build aircraft were delivered to the U.S. Army in 1989. The subsequent arming of the AHIP and the System Safety Enhancement Program (SSEP) caused aircraft to be steadily refitted until 1999.)
- Introduction date: May 1969
- First flight: Bell 206A: 10 January 1966; OH-58D: 6 October 1983; OH-58F: 26 April 2013
- Retired: 2020 (U.S. Army)
- Developed from: Bell 206

The Bell OH-58 Kiowa is a family of single-engine single-rotor military helicopters used for observation, utility, and direct fire support. It was produced by the American manufacturer Bell Helicopter and is closely related to the Model 206A JetRanger civilian helicopter.

The OH-58 was originally developed in the early 1960s as the D-250 for the Light Observation Helicopter (LOH). While the rival Hughes OH-6 Cayuse was picked over Bell's submission in May 1965, the company refined its design to create the Model 206A, a variant of which it successfully submitted to the reopened LOH competition two years later. The initial model, designated by the service as the OH-58A, was introduced in May 1969. Successive models followed, often with uprated engines, enhanced protection systems, and other improvements, culminating in the OH-58F. Additional improvements, such as the OH-58X, were proposed but not pursued.

In the 1970s, the U.S. Army became interested in pursuing an advanced scout helicopter, for which the OH-58 was further developed, evaluated, and ultimately procured as the OH-58D Kiowa Warrior. The OH-58D is equipped to perform armed reconnaissance missions and to provide fire support to friendly ground forces. It is equipped with a distinctive Mast Mounted Sight (MMS) containing various sensors for target acquisition and laser designation. Another visible feature present on most OH-58s are knife-like extensions above and below the cockpit as part of the passive wire strike protection system. The early-build OH-58s were equipped with a two-bladed main rotor, while the OH-58D and newer variants have a four-bladed rotor.

The OH-58 was primarily produced for the U.S. Army, and deployed in the Vietnam War two months after its entry to service. The U.S. Army made extensive use of OH-58 models across numerous war zones over the decades, seeing active combat during the Gulf War, the invasion of Panama, and the War in Afghanistan among others. In 2017, the U.S. Army withdrew its remaining OH-58s, using alternative rotorcraft such as the Boeing AH-64 Apache and unmanned aerial vehicles (UAVs), to fill the role. The OH-58 has been exported to Austria, Canada, Croatia, the Dominican Republic, Taiwan, Saudi Arabia, and Greece. It has also been produced under license in Australia.

== Development ==
=== Light Observation Helicopter (LOH) ===
In October 1960, the United States Navy approached 25 helicopter manufacturers to request on behalf of the U.S. Army the submission of proposals for a Light Observation Helicopter (LOH). Bell Helicopter was one of the manufacturers approached, and entered the competition along with 12 other manufacturers, including Hiller Aircraft and Hughes Tool Co., Aircraft Division. Bell's design was internally referred to as the D-250, and was officially designated as the YHO-4. In May 1961, Bell and Hiller won the design competition.

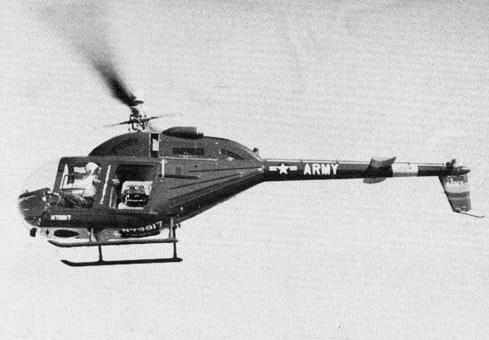
YOH-4A LOH in flight

Bell developed the D-250 design into the Model 206. The HO-4 designation was changed to YOH-4A in 1962, and produced five prototype aircraft for the Army's test and evaluation phase. On 8 December 1962, the first prototype performed its maiden flight. The YOH-4A was also called the Ugly Duckling in comparison to other contending aircraft. After a fly off of the Bell, Hughes and Fairchild-Hiller prototypes, the Hughes OH-6 Cayuse was selected in May 1965.

When the YOH-4A was rejected by the Army, Bell went about solving the problem of marketing the aircraft. In addition to the image problem, the helicopter lacked cargo space and only provided cramped quarters for the planned three passengers in the back. The solution was a fuselage redesigned to be more sleek and aesthetic, adding 16 cubic feet (0.45 cubic metres) of cargo space in the process. The redesigned aircraft was designated as the Model 206A. Bell President Edwin J. Ducayet named it the JetRanger, denoting an evolution from the popular Model 47J Ranger.

In 1967, the Army reopened the LOH competition for bids because Hughes Tool Co. Aircraft Division could not meet the contractual production demands. Bell resubmitted for the program using the Bell 206A. Fairchild-Hiller failed to resubmit their bid with the YOH-5A, which they had successfully marketed as the FH-1100. In the end, Bell underbid Hughes to win the contract, and the Bell 206A was designated as the OH-58A. Following the U.S. Army's naming convention for helicopters, the OH-58A was named Kiowa in honor of the Native American tribe.

=== Advanced Scout Helicopter ===
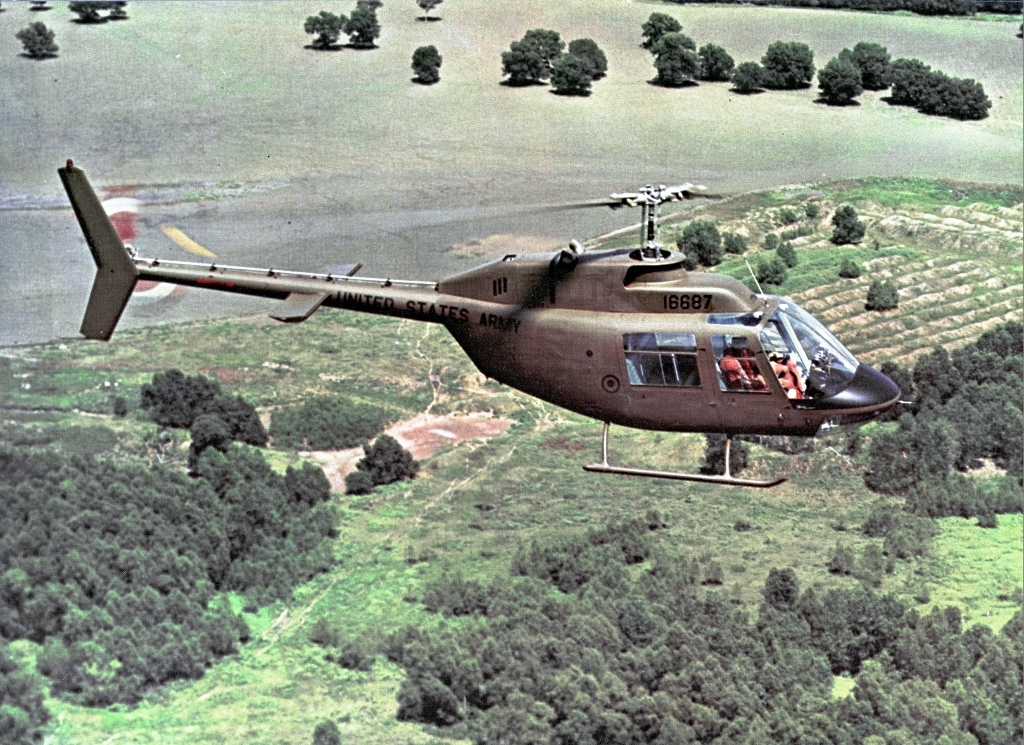
An OH-58 Kiowa

In the 1970s, the U.S. Army began evaluating the need to improve the capabilities of their scout aircraft. Anticipating the AH-64A's replacement of the AH-1, the Army began shopping the idea of an Aerial Scout Program to stimulate the development of advanced technological capabilities for night vision and precision navigation equipment. The stated goals of the program included prototypes that would:

...possess an extended target acquisition range capability by means of a long-range stabilized optical subsystem for the observer, improved position location through use of a computerized navigation system, improved survivability by reducing aural, visual, radar, and infrared signatures, and an improved flight performance capability derived from a larger engine to provide compatibility with attack helicopters.

In March 1974, the Army created a special task force at Fort Knox to develop the system requirements. By 1975, the task force had devised the requirements for an Advanced Scout Helicopter (ASH) program. The requirements were formulated around an rotorcraft capable of performing in day, night, and adverse weather, and compatible with all advanced weapons systems planned for development and fielding into the 1980s. The program was approved by the System Acquisition Review Council and the Army prepared for competitive development to begin the next year. As the Army tried to get the program off the ground, Congress declined to provide funding in the fiscal year 1977 budget. The ASH Project Manager's Office (PM-ASH) was closed in September 1976.

While no development occurred for some years, the program survived as a requirement without funding. In November 1979, the decision was made to defer development of an advanced scout helicopter in favor of modifying existing airframes in inventory as a near term scout helicopter (NTSH) option. The development of a mast-mounted sight was the primary focus to improve the ability to perform reconnaissance, surveillance, and target acquisition missions while remaining hidden behind trees and terrain. Both the UH-1 and the OH-58 were evaluated as NTSH candidates, but the UH-1 was dropped from consideration due to its larger size and ease of detection. The OH-58, demonstrated a dramatic reduction in detectability with a Mast-Mounted Sight (MMS).

In July 1980, the Army decided that the NTSH would be a competitive modification program based on developments in the commercial helicopter sector, particularly Hughes Helicopters' Hughes 500D, which had made major improvements over the OH-6.

=== Army Helicopter Improvement Program (AHIP) ===
The Army's decision to acquire the NTSH resulted in the "Army Helicopter Improvement Program (AHIP)". Both Bell Helicopter and Hughes Helicopters redesigned their scout aircraft to compete for the contract. Bell offered a more robust version of the OH-58 in their Model 406. Hughes offered an upgraded version of the OH-6. In September 1981, Bell Helicopter Textron was awarded a development contract. On 6 October 1983, the first prototype performed its maiden flight, In 1985, the aircraft entered service as the OH-58D.

Initially intended for attack, cavalry, and artillery roles, the Army only approved a low initial production level and confined the OH-58D's role to field artillery observation. The Army also directed that a follow-on test be conducted to further evaluate it due to perceived deficiencies. In April 1986, the Army formed a task force at Fort Rucker, Alabama, to remedy deficiencies in the AHIP. In 1988, the Army had planned to discontinue the OH-58D and focus on the LHX. Congress approved $138 million to expand the program, calling for the AHIP to operate with the Apache as a hunter/killer team. The AHIP would locate targets and the Apache would destroy them in a throwback to the traditional OH-58/AH-1 relationship.

The Secretary of the Army directed instead that the aircraft's armament systems be upgraded, based on experience with Task Force 118's performance operating armed OH-58Ds in the Persian Gulf in support of Operation Prime Chance, and that the type be used primarily for scouting and armed reconnaissance. The armed aircraft was named the OH-58D Kiowa Warrior, denoting its new armed configuration. Beginning with the 202nd aircraft in May 1991, all remaining OH-58Ds were produced in the Kiowa Warrior configuration. In January 1992, Bell received its first retrofit contract to convert all remaining OH-58Ds to the Kiowa Warrior configuration.

=== Production ===
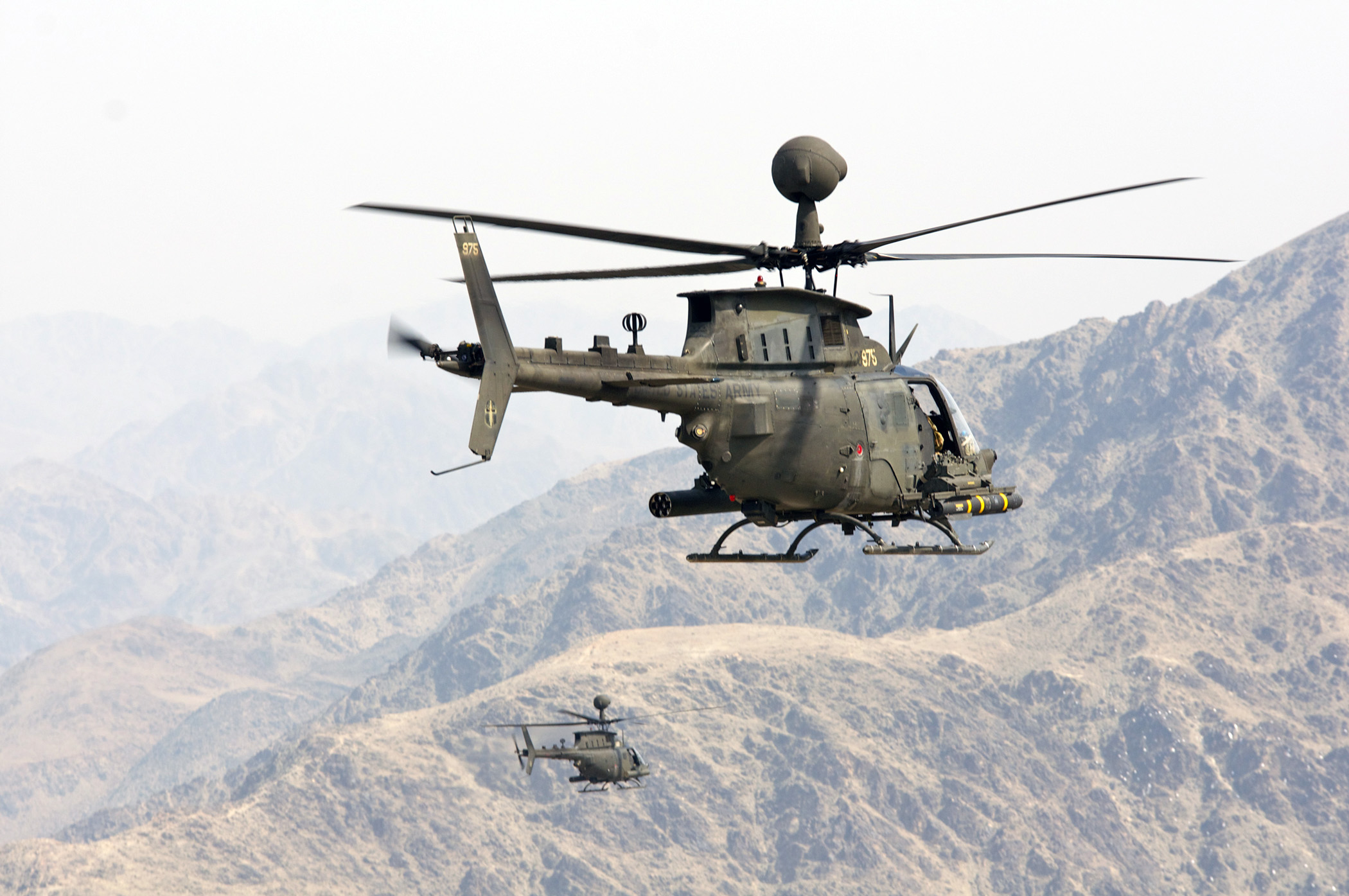
Two OH-58Ds in flight

2,325 OH-58 were produced, with an additional 56 Bell 206B-1 built. Production of new airframes for the A and B models ended in 1977, and the D model in 2000. Conversions of early models to the D standard continued afterward.

== Design ==
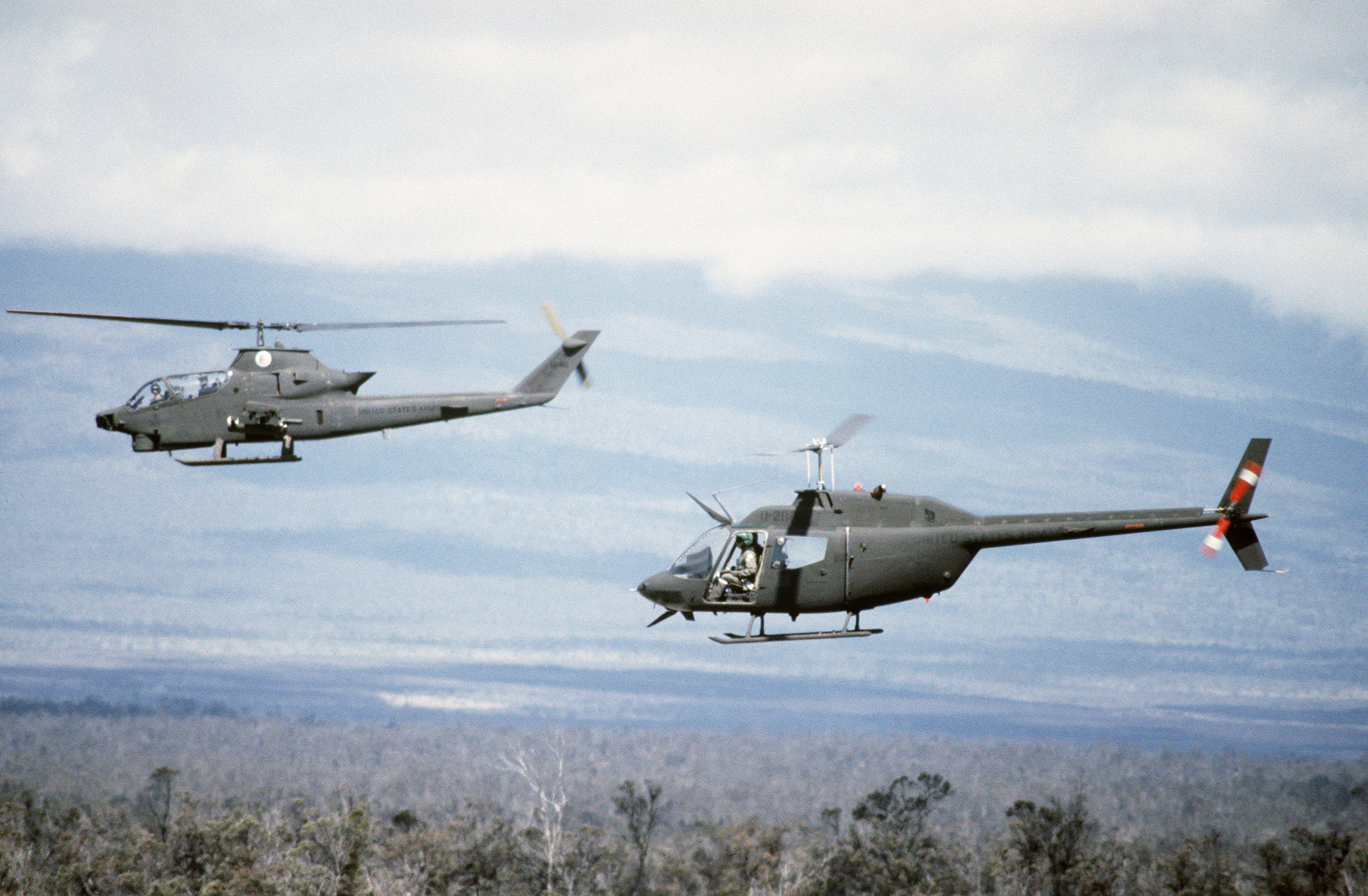
An OH-58 with an AH-1 Cobra in June 1985

The Bell OH-58 Kiowa is a family of single-engine single-rotor military helicopters principally used for observation, utility, and direct fire support. The primary role of the original OH-58A was to identify targets for other platforms, such as the Bell AH-1 Cobra attack helicopter and ground artillery. It lacked any armaments and weighed 1,451 kg (3,200 lb) when fully loaded, being able to carry a small amount of cargo or up to two passengers. While initial examples were reliant on the crew to conduct observations, later models were furnished with sophisticated sensors to precisely determine a target's location. Payload capacity was increased considerably on later-build rotorcraft. The OH-58D Kiowa was designed to carry a maximum load of 2,495 kg, 72% more capacity than the original version.

Early Kiowas were fitted with a flexible twin-bladed main rotor. Starting with the OH-58D, a four-bladed rigid main rotor was used. Entirely composed of composite materials, the OH-58D was the first US Army rotorcraft to incorporate an all-composite main rotor hub. Later models were outfitted as light gunships, equipped with armaments such as Stinger air-to-air missiles, a .50-caliber machine gun, podded 70mm Hydra rockets and AGM-114 Hellfire air to ground missiles.

Other areas of improvement were the avionics and the cockpit. New navigation and communication systems were installed with new and larger flight instrumentation. All light sources were redesigned for compatibility with Night Vision Goggles (NVG). Later versions were outfitted with a glass cockpit, which retained conventional instrumentation as a fallback measure.

An OH-58D firing its .50 caliber machine gun and Hydra 70 rockets

The OH-58D introduced perhaps the most distinctive feature of the Kiowa family — the Mast Mounted Sight (MMS), which resembles a beach ball perched above the rotor system. The MMS by Ball Aerospace & Technologies has a gyro-stabilized platform containing a television system (TVS), a thermal imaging system (TIS), and a laser range finder/designator (LRF/D). These features gave the OH-58D the additional mission capability of target acquisition and laser designation in day or night, limited-visibility and adverse weather. In combination with the 1553 databus, the OH-58D being first US Army helicopter to be fielded with such equipment, target data from the sensors could be directly passed to precision-guided weapons.

The MMS was developed by the McDonnell Douglas Corp. in Huntington Beach, CA. Production took place primarily at facilities in Monrovia, CA. As a result of a merger with Boeing, and a later sale of the business unit, the program is currently owned and managed by DRS Technologies, with engineering support based in Cypress, CA, and production support taking place in Melbourne, FL. On the OH-58F, the MMS was removed, its functions replaced by the AAS-53 Common Sensor Payload, which is mounted on the chin.

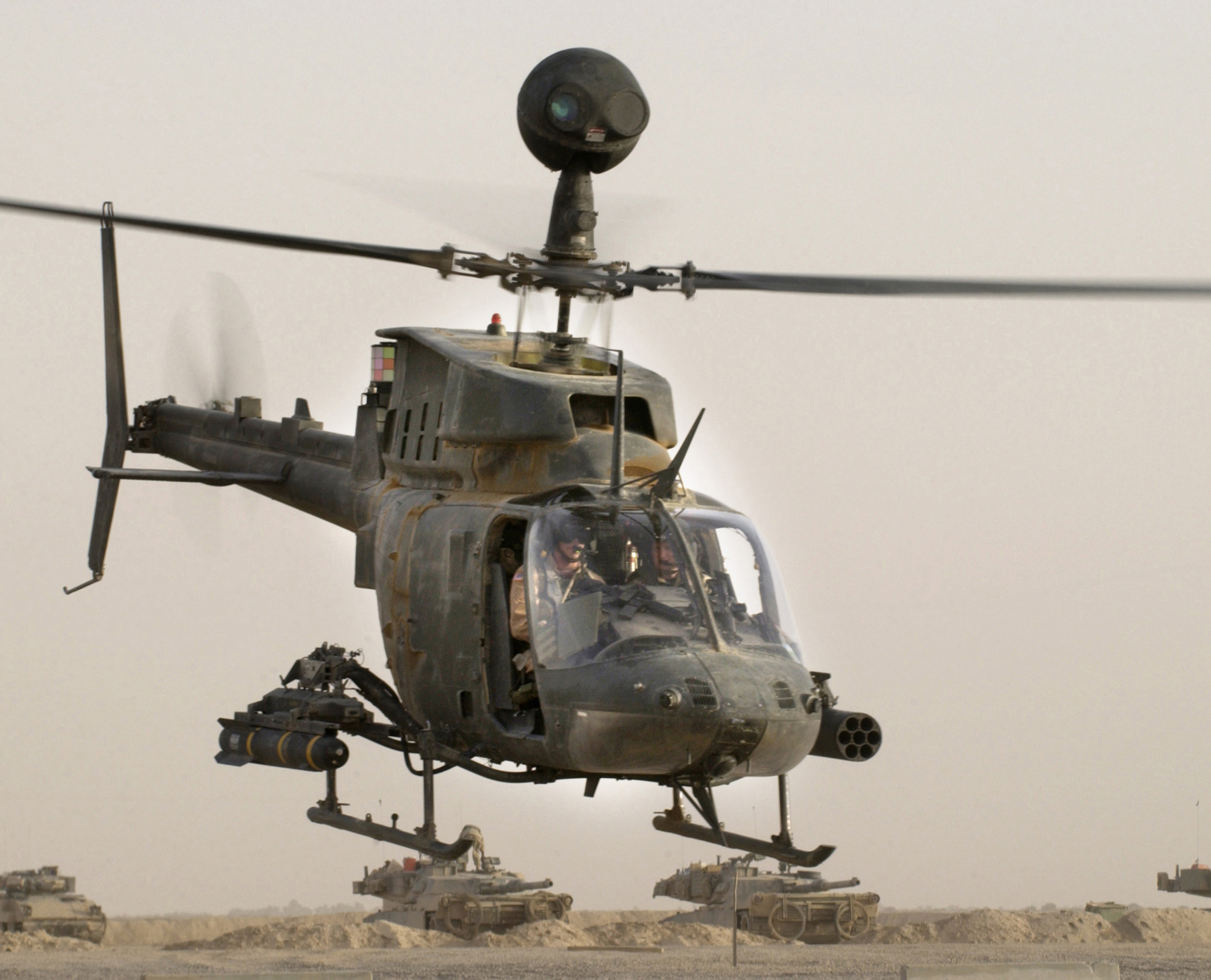
An OH-58D Kiowa Warrior takes off armed with an AGM-114 Hellfire and 7 Hydra 70 rockets.

A distinctive feature of operational OH-58s are the knife-like extensions above and below the cockpit as part of the passive wire strike protection system. It protects 90% of the frontal area of the helicopter from wire strikes at low altitudes, by directing wires to the upper or lower blades before they can entangle the rotor blade or landing skids. The OH-58 was the first helicopter to test this system, after which the system was adopted by the US Army for the OH-58 and most of their other helicopters. Other defensive and survivability measures were incorporated, such as ballistic floor armor, a missile warning system, crashworthy seats, and infrared suppression systems for the engine exhaust.

== Operational history ==
In May 1969, the first OH-58A Kiowa was received at a ceremony held at Bell Helicopter's Fort Worth plant, officiated by Major General John Norton, commanding general of the Army Aviation Materiel Command (AMCOM). In August 1969, production OH-58A helicopters arrived in South Vietnam for the first time, accompanied by a New Equipment Training Team (NETT) with personnel from the US Army and Bell Helicopters. Although the Kiowa production contract had replaced the LOH contract with Hughes, the OH-58A did not automatically replace the OH-6A in operations. The Kiowa and the Cayuse continued operating in the same theater until the end of the conflict.

=== Vietnam War ===
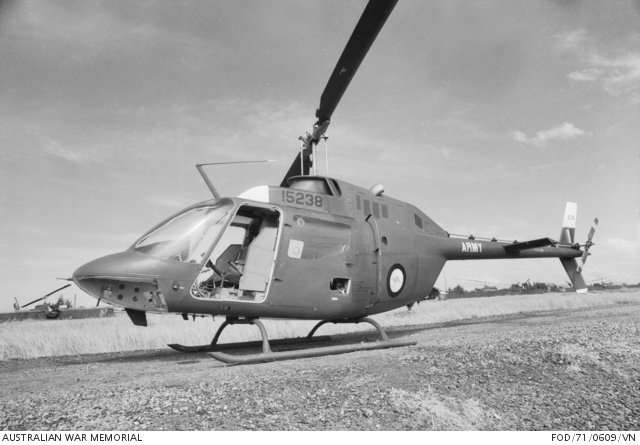
An Australian Army OH-58A in South Vietnam, December 1971

On 27 March 1970, an OH-58A Kiowa (s/n 68-16785) was shot down over South Vietnam, one of the first OH-58A losses of the war. The pilot, Warrant Officer Ralph Quick Jr., was flying Lieutenant Colonel Joseph Benoski Jr. as an artillery spotter. After completing a battle damage assessment for a previous fire mission, the aircraft was damaged by .51 inch (13 mm) machine gun fire and crashed, killing both crew members. Approximately 45 OH-58A helicopters were destroyed during the Vietnam War due to combat losses and accidents.

One of the last combat losses in the theatre was of an OH-58A from A Troop, 3-17th Cavalry, flown by First Lieutenant Thomas Knuckey. On 27 May 1971, Lieutenant Knuckey was also flying a battle damage assessment mission when his aircraft came under machine gun fire and exploded. Knuckey and his observer, Sergeant Philip Taylor, both died in the explosion.

=== Operation Prime Chance ===
In early 1988, armed OH-58D (AHIP) helicopters from the 118th Aviation Task Force were phased in to replace the SEABAT (AH-6/MH-6) teams of Task Force 160th to carry out Operation Prime Chance, the escort of oil tankers during the Iran–Iraq War. On 24 February 1988, two AHIP helicopters reported to the Mobile Sea Base Wimbrown VII, and the helicopter team ("SEABAT" team after their callsign) stationed on the barge returned to the United States.

For the next few months, the AHIP helicopters on the Wimbrown VII shared patrol duties with the SEABAT team on the Hercules. Coordination proved difficult, despite frequent requests from TF-160, the SEABAT team on the Hercules was not replaced by an AHIP detachment until June 1988. The OH-58D helicopter crews involved in the operation received deck landing and underwater survival training from the Navy.

In November 1988, the number of OH-58D helicopters that supported Task Force 118 was reduced. The rotorcraft continued to operate from the Navy's Mobile Sea Base Hercules, the frigate Underwood, and the destroyer Conolly. OH-58D operations primarily entailed reconnaissance flights at night, and depending on maintenance requirements and ship scheduling, Army helicopters usually rotated from the mobile sea base and other combatant ships to a land base every seven to fourteen days. On 18 September 1989, an OH-58D crashed during night gunnery practice and sank, with no loss of personnel. When the Mobile Sea Base Hercules was deactivated in September 1989, all but five OH-58D helicopters redeployed to the continental United States.

=== Gulf War ===
During Operation Desert Shield, the build-up to Operation Desert Storm, U.S. Army OH-58Ds exercised alongside USMC AH-1Ws and assisted with targeting and laser spotting. While this tactic worked and was effective, there is little evidence that this tactic was used, likely to a lack of OH-58Ds.

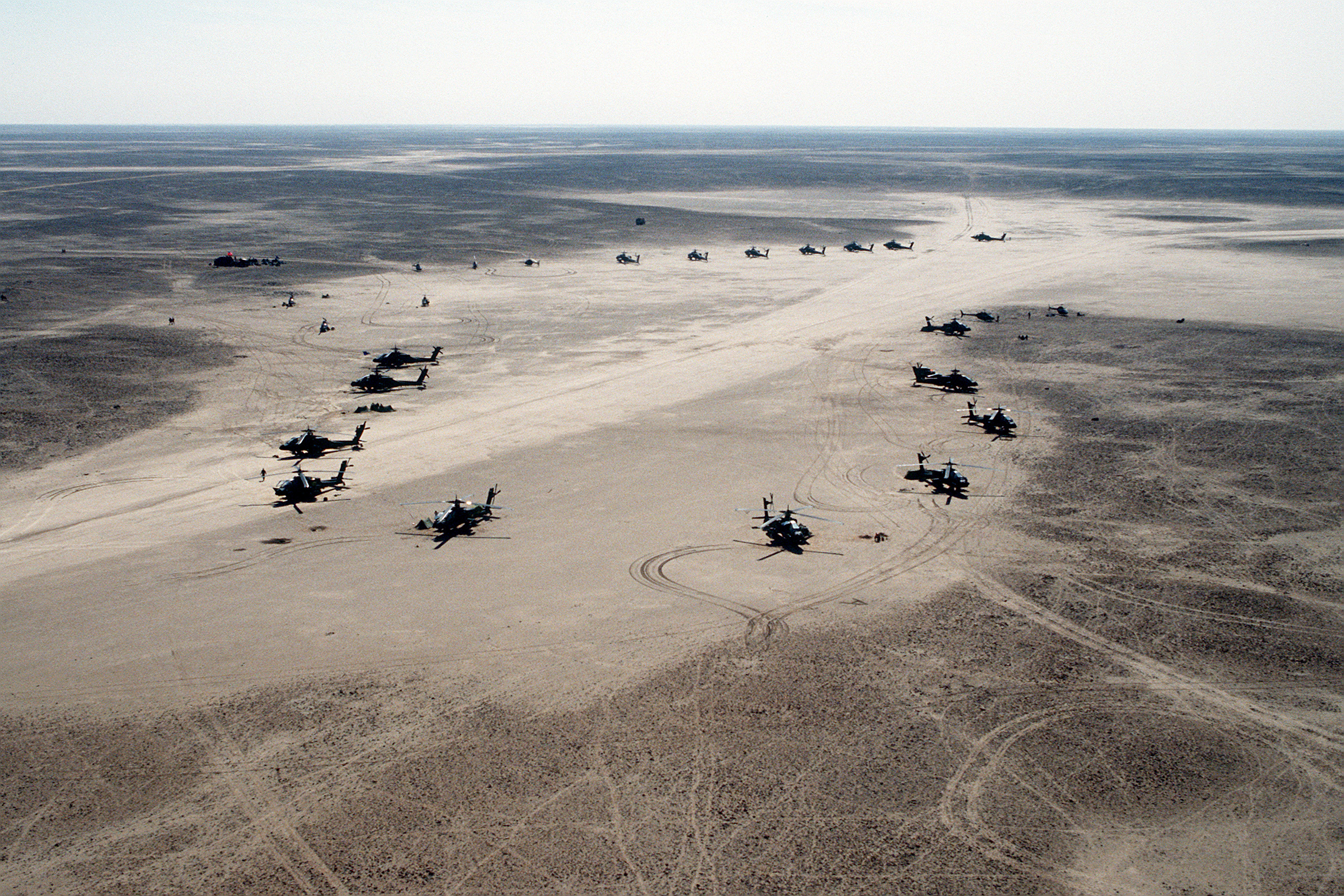
AH-64A Apache attack and OH-58D Kiowa Warrior helicopters of the 101st Airborne Division at a forward operating base during Operation Desert Storm

During Operation Desert Storm, 130 deployed OH-58D helicopters worked alongside the other Army attack helicopters, 145 AH-1 Cobras and 277 AH-64 Apaches, and participated in a wide variety of critical combat ground forces mission. During Operation Desert Shield and Operation Desert Storm, the Kiowas collectively flew nearly 9,000 hours with a 92 percent fully mission capable rate. The Kiowa Warrior had the lowest ratio of maintenance hours to flight hours of any combat helicopter in the war.

Army attack helicopters also worked jointly with close air support and support aircraft such as the USAF A-10As, F-16A/Cs, EF-111As, EC-130H Compass Call, F-4G Phantom II "Wild Weasel", and E-8 Joint STARS.

=== RAID ===
In 1989, Congress mandated that the Army National Guard take part in the US war on drugs, enabling them to aid federal, state and local law enforcement agencies with "special congressional entitlements". In response, the Army National Guard Bureau created the Reconnaissance and Aerial Interdiction Detachments (RAID) in 1992, consisting of aviation units in 31 states with 76 specially modified OH-58A helicopters to assume the reconnaissance/interdiction role in the fight against illegal drugs. In 1994, 24 states conducted more than 1,200 aerial counterdrug reconnaissance and interdiction missions, conducting many of these missions at night. Eventually, the program was expanded to cover 32 states and consisting of 116 aircraft, including dedicated training aircraft at the Western Army Aviation Training Site (WAATS) in Marana, Arizona.

The RAID program's mission has now been expanded to include the war against terrorism and supporting U.S. Border Patrol activities in support of homeland defense. The National Guard RAID units' Area of Operation (AO) is the only one in the Department of Defense that is wholly contained within the borders of the United States.

=== Operation Just Cause and action in the 1990s ===
During Operation Just Cause in 1989, a team consisting of an OH-58 and an AH-1 were part of the Aviation Task Force during the securing of Fort Amador in Panama. The OH-58 was fired upon by Panama Defense Force soldiers and crashed 100 yards (90 m) away, in the Bay of Panama. The pilot was rescued, but the co-pilot was killed in action.

On 17 December 1994, Army Chief Warrant Officers (CWO) David Hilemon and Bobby Hall left Camp Page, South Korea on a routine training mission along the Demilitarized Zone (DMZ). Their flight was intended to be to a point known as Checkpoint 84, south of the DMZ "no-fly zone", but the OH-58C Kiowa strayed nearly four miles (6 km) into the Kangwon Province, inside North Korean airspace, due to errors in navigating the snow-covered, rugged terrain. The helicopter was shot down by North Korean troops and CWO Hilemon was killed. CWO Hall was held captive and the North Korean government insisted that the crew had been spying. Five days of negotiations resulted in the North Koreans turning over Hilemon's body to U.S. authorities. The negotiations failed to secure Hall's immediate release. After 13 days in captivity, Hall was freed on 30 December, uninjured.

=== Afghanistan and Iraq ===
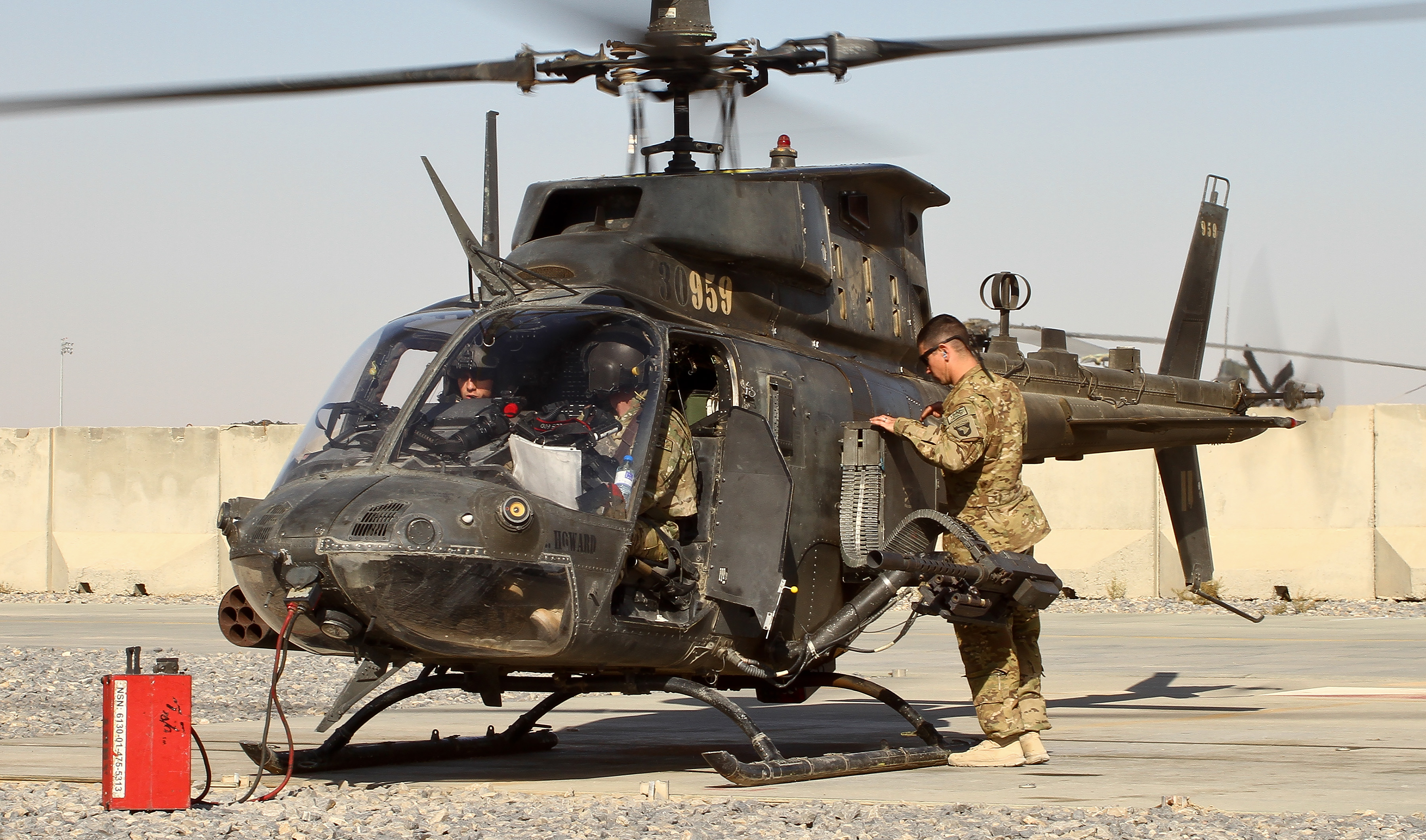
OH-58D at Kandahar, 2011

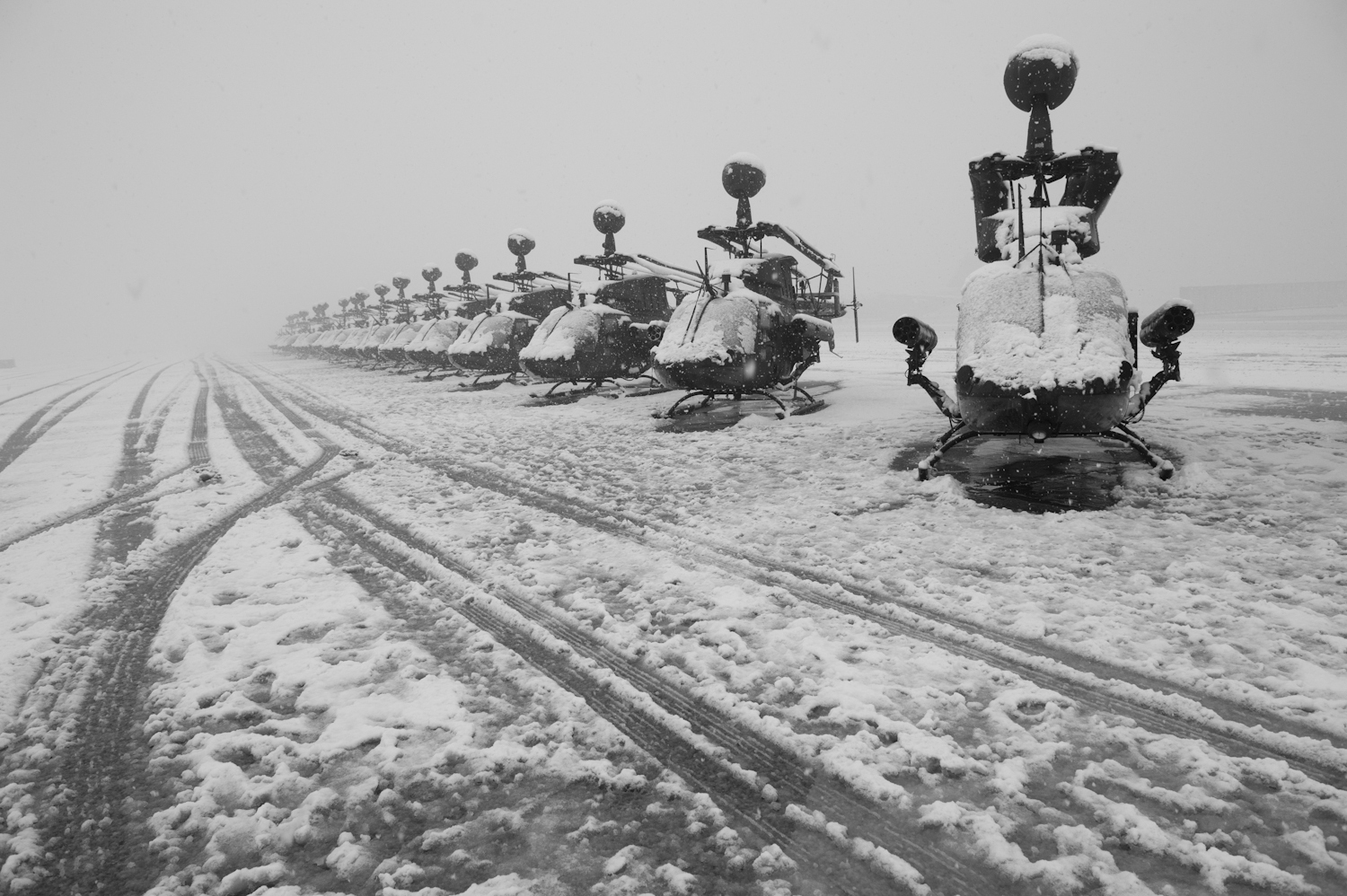
A group of Kiowa Warriors covered by snow at Bagram Air Base, 2013

The U.S. Army employed the OH-58D during Operation Iraqi Freedom in Iraq and Operation Enduring Freedom in Afghanistan. Between a combination of combat and accidents, over 35 airframes were lost, resulting in the deaths of 35 pilots. Their presence was also anecdotally credited with saving lives, having been used to rescue wounded despite their small size.

In Iraq, OH-58Ds flew 72 hours per month. In Afghanistan, the type flew 80 hours per month. In April 2013, Bell stated that the OH-58 collectively accumulated 820,000 combat hours, and had achieved a 90% mission capable rate.

=== Retirement ===
The U.S. Army's first attempt to replace the OH-58 was the RAH-66 Comanche of the Light Helicopter Experimental program, which was canceled in 2004. Airframe age and losses led to the Armed Reconnaissance Helicopter program and the Bell ARH-70, which was canceled in 2008 due to cost overruns. The third replacement effort was the Armed Aerial Scout program.

Due to uncertainty in the AAS program and fiscal restraints, the OH-58F's planned retirement was extended from 2025 to 2036. The Kiowa's scout role was supplemented by tactical unmanned aerial vehicles, the two platforms often acting in conjunction to provide reconnaissance to expose crews to less risk. The OH-58F had the ability to control UAVs directly to safely perform scout missions. In 2011, the Kiowa was scheduled to be replaced by the light version of the Future Vertical Lift aircraft in the 2030s.

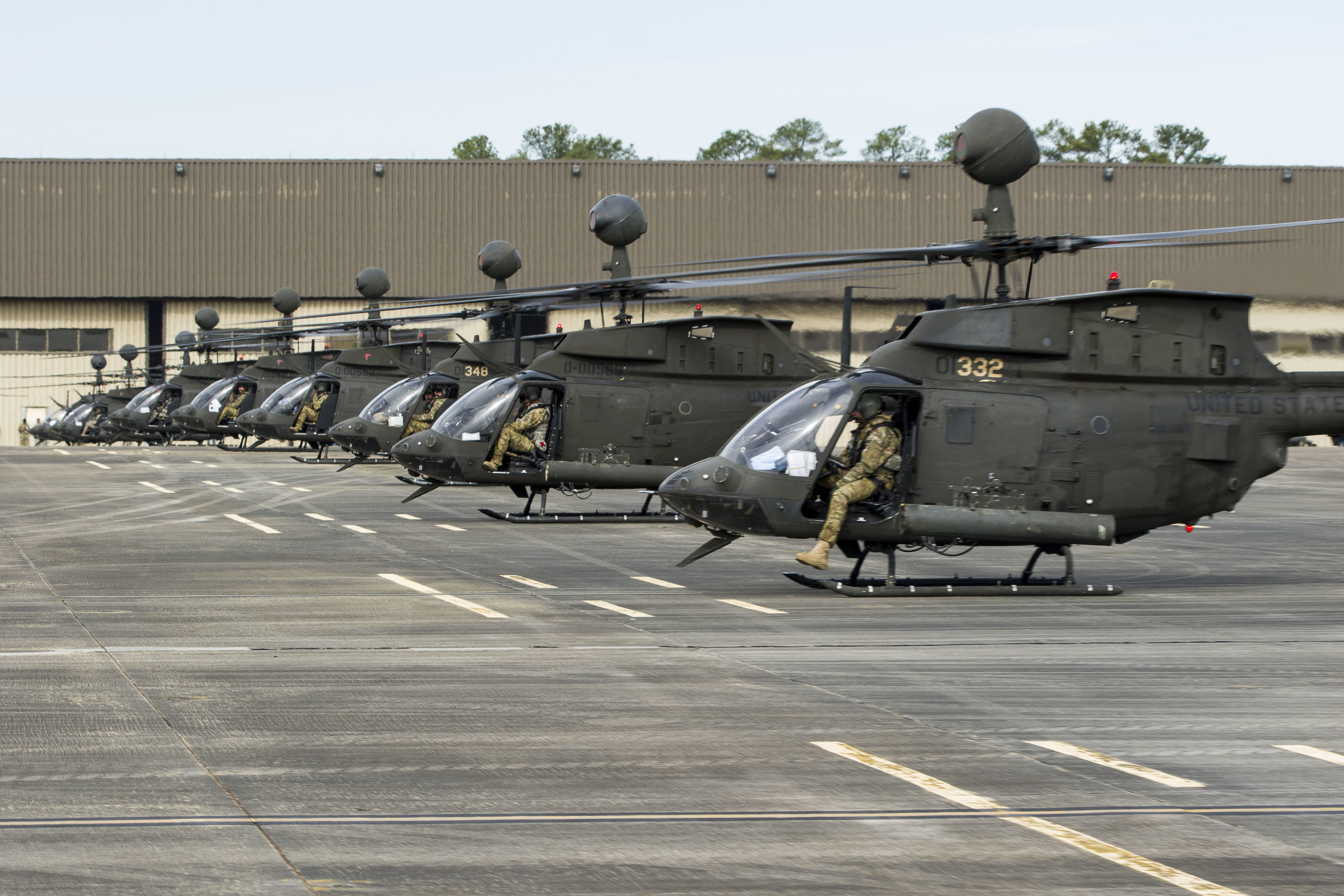
After 40 years of service, the final flight of the OH-58D of the 82nd Airborne Division in 2016 at Fort Bragg, on the flight line

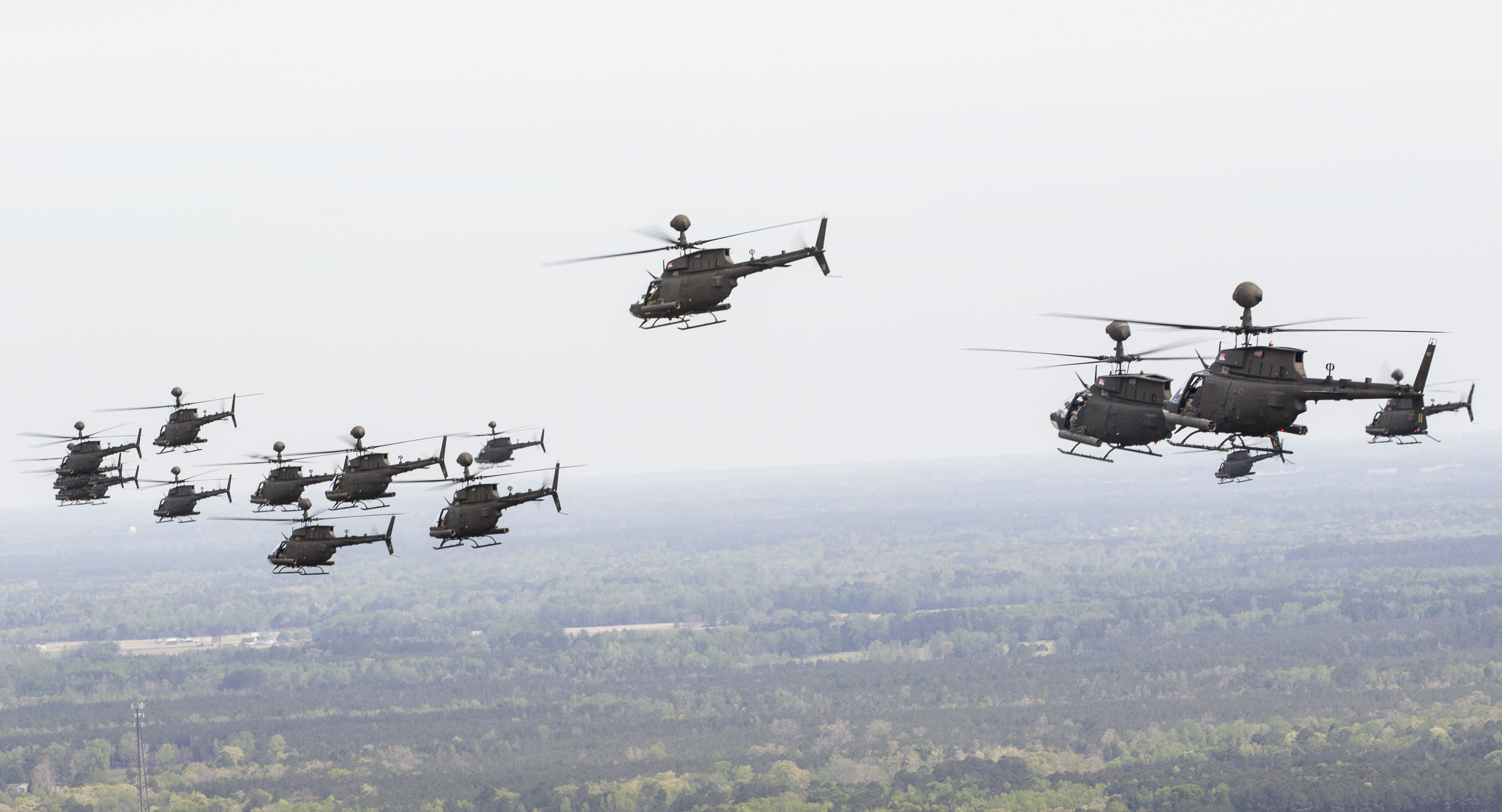
The OH-58D's farewell flight

In December 2013, the U.S. Army had 338 Kiowas in its active-duty force and 30 in the Army National Guard. The Army considered retiring the Kiowa as part of a wider restructuring to cut costs and reduce the variety of helicopters operated. The Analysis of Alternatives for the AAS program found that operating the Kiowa alongside RQ-7 Shadow UAVs was the most affordable and capable solution, while the AH-64E Apache Guardian was the most capable immediate solution. One proposal was to transfer all Army National Guard and Army Reserve AH-64s to the active Army for use as scouts, to divest the OH-58.

The Apache costs 50 percent more than the Kiowa to operate and maintain. Studies note that had it been used in place of the Kiowa in Iraq and Afghanistan, total operating costs would have risen by $4 billion, but also saved $1 billion per year in operating and sustainment costs. UH-60 Black Hawks would transfer from the active Army to reserve and Guard units. The aim was to retire older helicopters and retain those with the best capabilities to save money. Retiring the Kiowa would fund Apache upgrades.

In 2014, the Army placed 26 out of 335 OH-58Ds in non-flyable storage. In anticipation of divestment, the Army looked to see if other military branches, government agencies, and foreign customers had interest in buying the type. The Kiowas were considered to be well priced for foreign countries with limited resources. Bell had not yet agreed to support them if sold overseas. Media expected OH-58s to go to foreign militaries rather than civil operators due to high operating cost. By 2015, the Army had divested 33 OH-58Ds. By January 2016, the Army had divested all but two OH-58D squadrons.

In June 2016, members of 1st Squadron, 17th Cavalry Regiment, 82nd Combat Aviation Brigade, arrived in South Korea as part of the Kiowa's last deployment in U.S. Army service. In the following year, the unit reequipped with AH-64s. In January 2017, the last Kiowa Warrior performed their last live fire maneuver before retirement.

Ex-U.S. Army OH-58Ds were made available through Excess Defense Article and foreign military sales (FMS) programs. In November 2014, Croatia sent a letter of intent for the acquisition of 16 OH-58Ds. In 2016, Croatia and Tunisia became the first nations to request the helicopters, ordering 16 and 24, respectively. Croatia received the first batch of 5 OH-58Ds at the Zadar-Zemunik air base in June 2016. In early 2018, Greece was granted 70 OH-58Ds via an FMS arrangement. The type has been initially stationed at Hellenic Army Aviation air base at Stefanovikio.

In March 2020, the U.S. Army selected the Bell 360 Invictus and Sikorsky Raider X as part of the Future Attack Reconnaissance Aircraft (FARA) program to fill the capability gap left by the retirement of the OH-58. In September 2020, the US Army retired its last OH-58Cs from active service at Fort Irwin. In February 2024, FARA was cancelled. By this point, there were three abandoned attempts to replace the OH-58 at a cost in excess of $9 billion. The armed scout role has been filled by the AH-64 and the unarmed RQ-7 Shadow UAV. This combination reportedly accomplished 80% of the scouting mission, while also providing greater firepower, durability, and speed.

== Variants ==
=== OH-58A ===
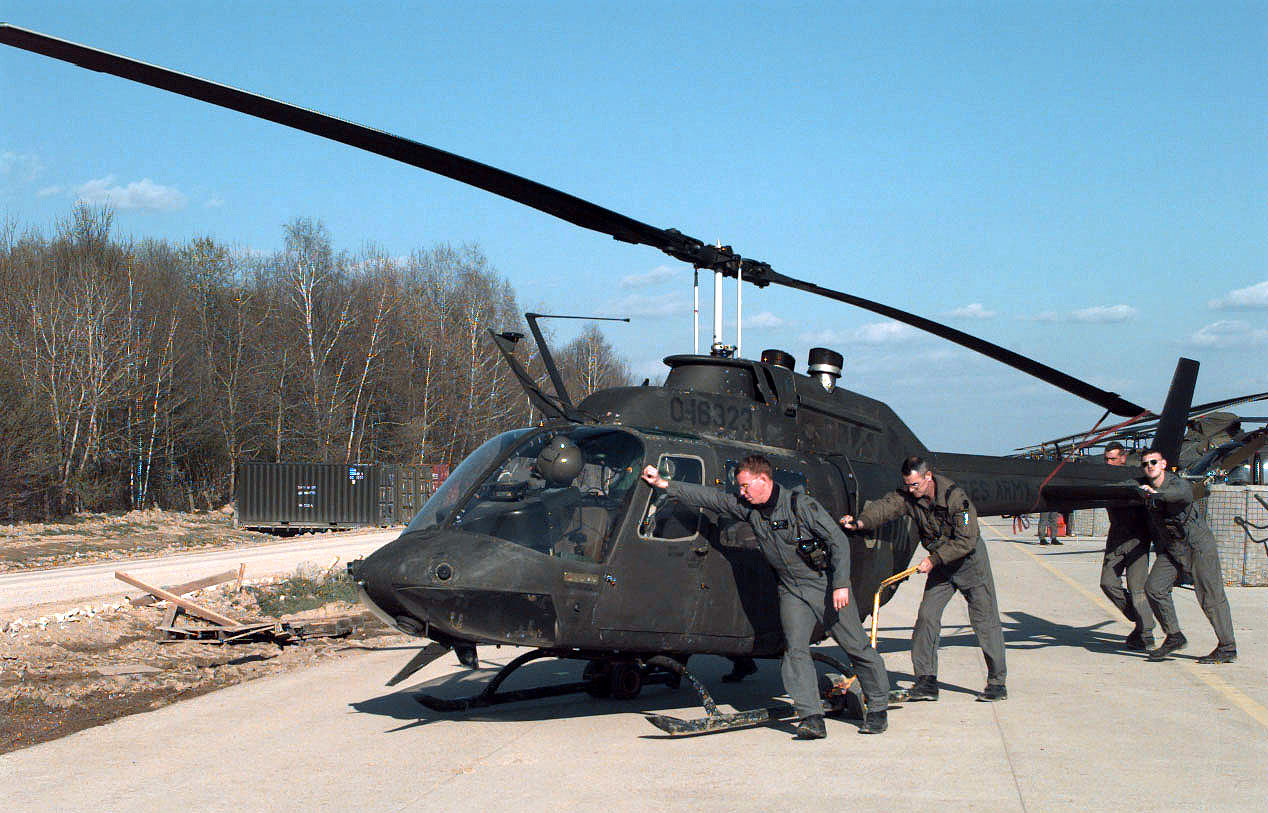
An OH-58 Kiowa

The OH-58A Kiowa is a four-place observation helicopter. It has two-place pilot seating, although the controls in the left seat are designed to be removed to carry a passenger up front. During its development for Vietnam War, it was fitted with the M134 Minigun, a 7.62 millimetres (0.300 in) electrically operated machine gun.

The Australian Army leased eight OH-58As in 1971 in South Vietnam for eight months. The Australian government procured the OH-58A for the Australian Army and Royal Australian Navy as the CAC CA-32. Licensed produced in Australia by Commonwealth Aircraft Corporation, the CA-32 was the equivalent of the 206B-1 (uprated engine and longer rotor blades). The first twelve of 56 were built in the U.S. then partially disassembled and shipped to Australia, where they were reassembled.

The first OH-58As in Australia were given the name Kalkadoon rather than Kiowa, at the suggestion of army minister Bob Katter Sr. who wished to honor the Kalkadoon people of Queensland rather than a Native American people. The new helicopters were affixed with "boomerang-shaped decals bearing the name Kalkadoon". The renaming was apparently poorly received by the Army and was dropped after Katter's term as minister concluded; the helicopters had reportedly been nicknamed "Kattercopters" by army personnel. Helicopters in the naval fleet were retired in 2000.

74 OH-58As were delivered to the Canadian Armed Forces as COH-58A and later redesignated CH-136 Kiowa. As many as 12 surplus Kiowas were sold to the Dominican Republic Air Force, and others sold privately in Australia.

In 1978, OH-58As began to be converted to the same engine and dynamic components as the OH-58C. In 1992, 76 OH-58A were modified with another engine upgrade, a thermal imaging system, a communications package for law enforcement, enhanced navigational equipment and high skid gear as part of the Army National Guard's (ARNG) Counter-Drug RAID program. The U.S. Army retired its last OH-58A in November 2017.

=== OH-58B ===
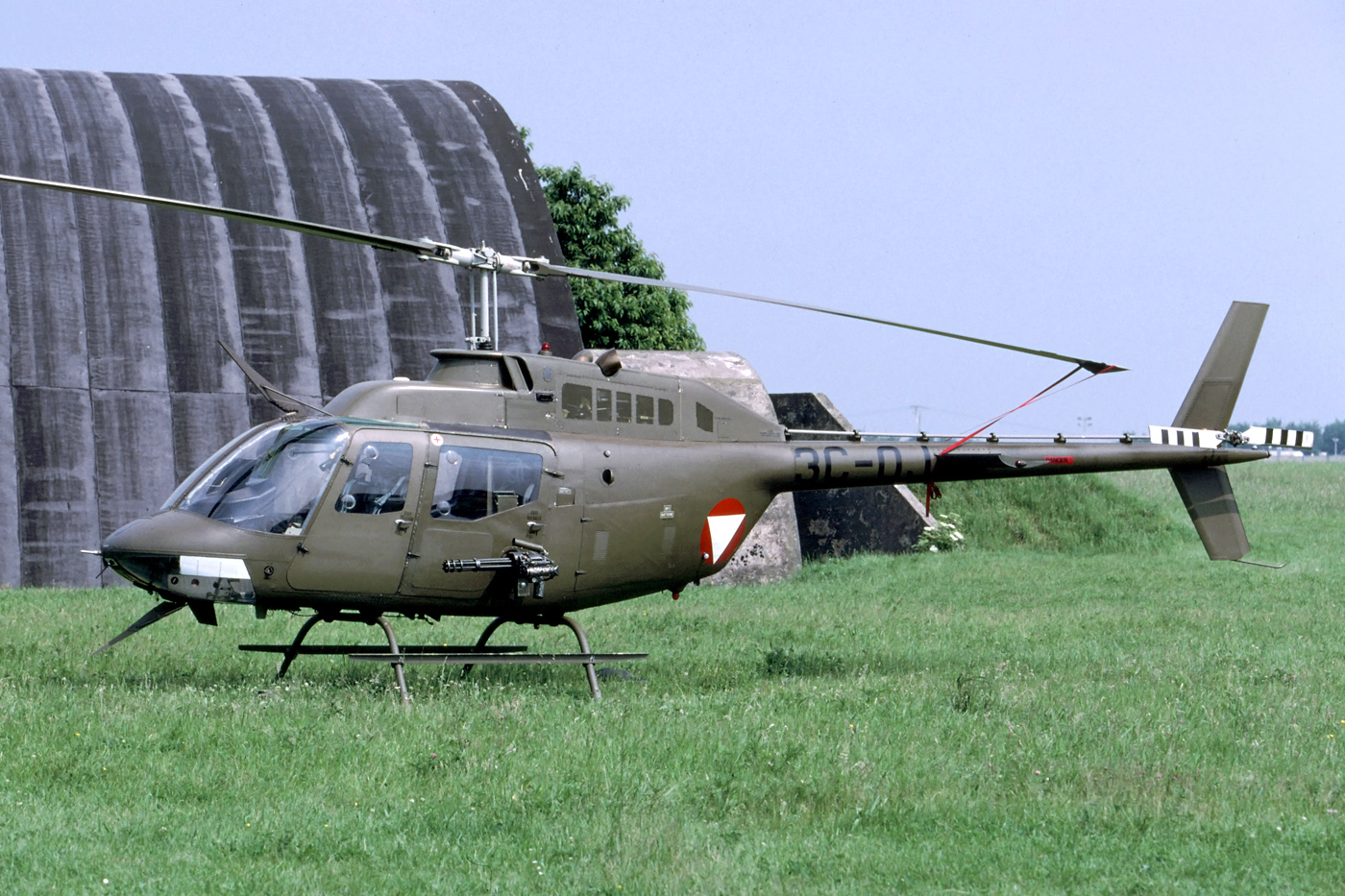
An OH-58B of the Austrian Air Combat Force

The OH-58B was an export version for the Austrian Air Force. Austria plans to replace the OH-58B by the end of 2030.

=== OH-58C ===
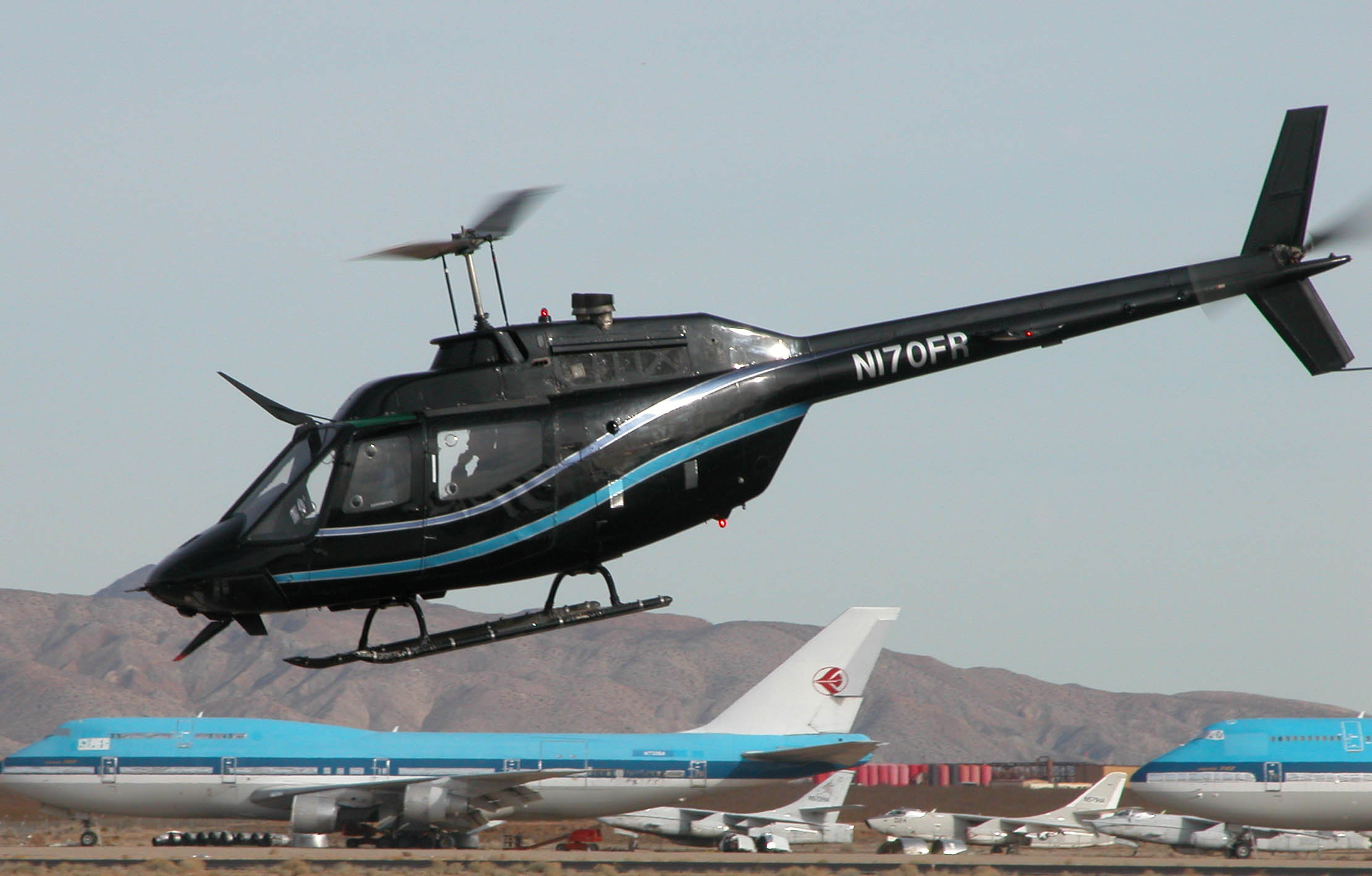
An OH-58C of the National Test Pilot School. Note the flat windscreen and IR exhaust suppressors.

Equipped with a more robust engine, the OH-58C was supposed to solve issues regarding the Kiowa's power. It had unique IR suppression systems mounted on its exhaust. Early OH-58Cs had flat-panel windscreens as an attempt to reduce glint from the sun, which could reveal its location to enemies. The windscreens had a negative effect of limiting the crew's forward view, a previous strength of the original design.

The aircraft had a larger instrument panel, roughly one–third bigger than the OH-58A panel, which held larger flight instruments. The panel had Night Vision Goggle (NVG) compatible cockpit lighting. The OH-58C were the first U.S. Army scout helicopter to be equipped with the AN/APR-39 radar detector, which alerted the crew to active anti-aircraft radar systems nearby. Some OH-58Cs were armed with two AIM-92 Stingers and are sometimes referred to as OH-58C/S, the "S" referring to the Stinger addition. Called Air-To-Air Stinger (ATAS), the weapon system was intended to provide an air defense capability.

The OH-58C was the final Kiowa variant still in service with the U.S. Army, with it used as a training aircraft. In September 2020, the US Army retired the last OH-58Cs from service. The final flight of the US Army OH-58C, tail number 69-16165 occurred at Fort Irwin, California on 29 September 2020.

=== OH-58D ===
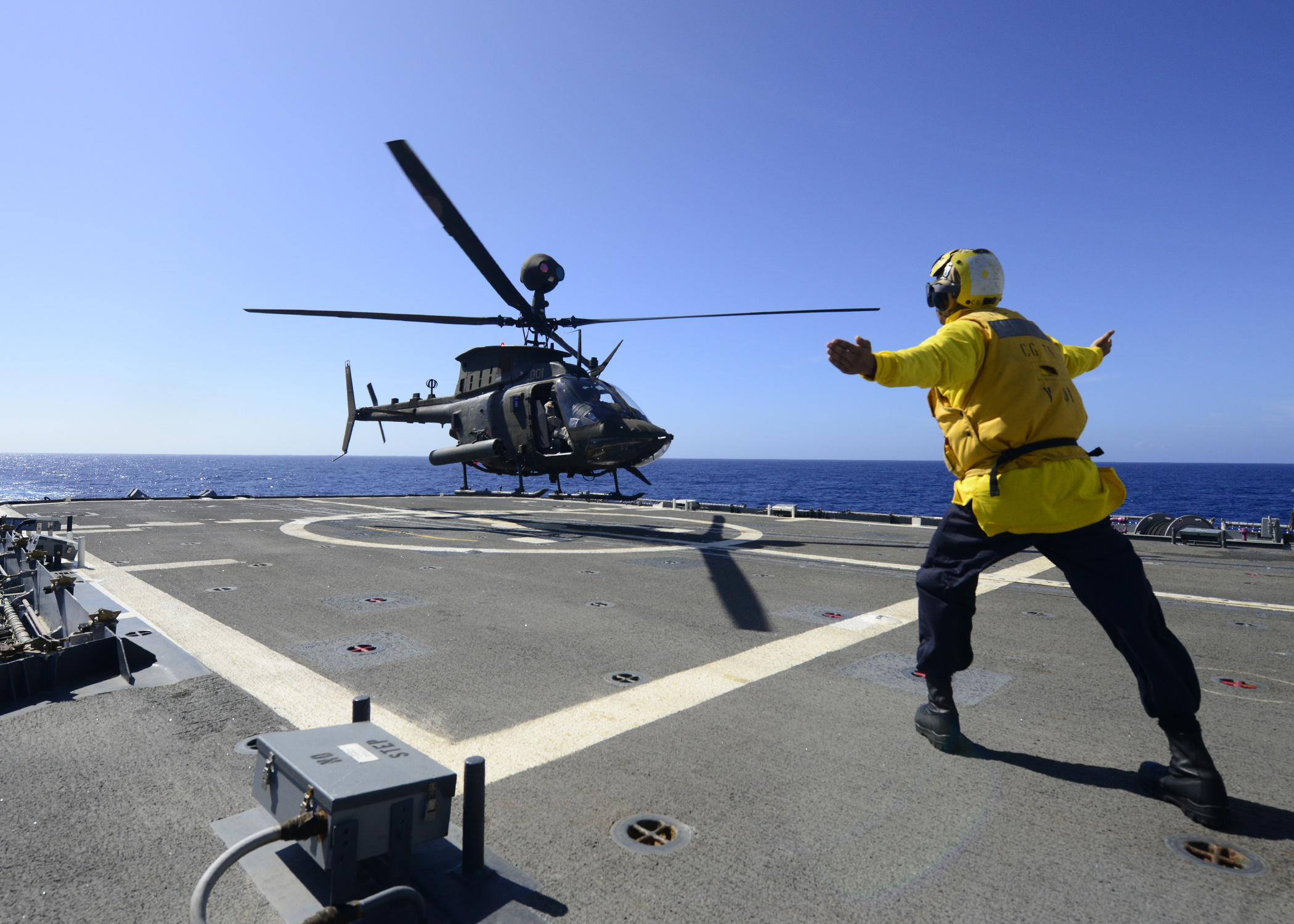
An OH-58D of 2nd Squadron, 6th Cavalry Regiment, landing on USS Lake Erie

The OH-58D (Bell Model 406) was the result of the Army Helicopter Improvement Program (AHIP). An upgraded transmission and engine gave extra power, needed for nap-of-the-earth flight profiles, and a four-bladed main rotor made it quieter than the two-bladed OH-58C. The OH-58D introduced the distinctive Mast-Mounted Sight (MMS) above the main rotor, and a mixed glass cockpit with traditional instruments as "standby" for emergencies.

The Bell 406CS "Combat Scout" was based on the OH-58D, sometimes referred to as the MH-58D. Fifteen aircraft were sold to Saudi Arabia. A roof-mounted Saab HeliTOW sight system was opted for in place of the MMS. The 406CS had detachable weapon hardpoints on each side.

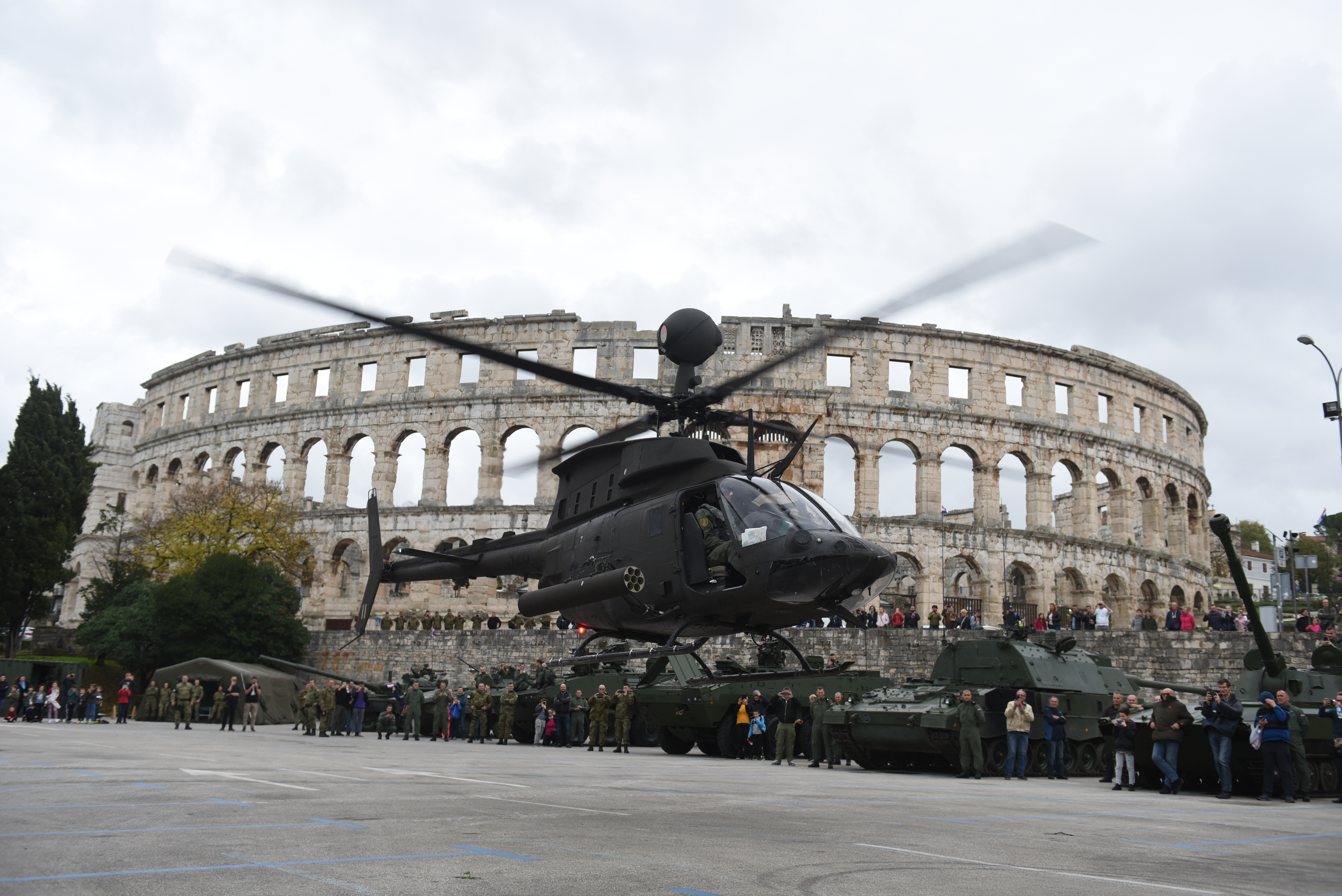
An OH-58D of the Croatian Air Force

The AH-58D was an OH-58D version operated by Task Force 118 (4th Squadron, 17th Cavalry) and modified with armament in support of Operation Prime Chance. The weapons and fire control systems became the basis for the Kiowa Warrior. AH-58D is not an official DOD aircraft designation, but is used by the Army in reference to these aircraft.

The Kiowa Warrior, sometimes referred to by its acronym KW, is the armed version of the OH-58D. A key difference between the Kiowa Warrior and original AHIP aircraft is a universal weapons pylon found mounted on both sides of the fuselage, capable of carrying combinations of AGM-114 Hellfire missiles, air-to-air Stinger (ATAS) missiles, 7-shot 2.75 inches (70 mm) Hydra-70 rocket pods, and an M296 0.50 in (12.7 mm) caliber machine gun. The performance standard of aerial gunnery from an OH-58D is to achieve at least one hit out of 70 shots fired at a wheeled vehicle 800 to 1,200 m (2,600 to 3,900 ft) away. The Kiowa Warrior includes improvements in available power, navigation, communication, survivability, and deployability.

=== OH-58E ===
The OH-58E was one of 13 design candidates in the Advanced Scout Helicopter of 1980. The study's conclusion was to launch the Army Helicopter Improvement Program (AHIP) in 1981, centered on the OH-58D instead.

=== OH-58F ===
The OH-58F is an OH-58D upgrade. The Cockpit and Sensor Upgrade Program (CASUP) adds a nose-mounted targeting and surveillance system alongside the MMS. The AAS-53 Common Sensor Payload has an infrared camera, color Electro-Optical camera, and image intensifier; via weight and drag reductions, flight performance increased by 1–2%. Cockpit upgrades include the Control and Display Subsystem version 5, more storage and processing power, three color multi-function displays, and dual-independent advanced moving maps.

It has Level 2 Manned-Unmanned (L2MUM) teaming, the Force Battle Command Brigade and Below (FBCB2) display screen, and can be updated to Blue Force Tracker 2. Survivability enhancements include ballistic floor armor and the Common Missile Warning System. It has greater situational awareness, digital inter-cockpit communications, HELLFIRE future upgrades, redesigned wiring harness, Health and Usage Monitoring (HUMS), and enhanced weapons functionality via 1760 digital interface.

The OH-58F is powered by a Rolls-Royce 250-C30R3 engine rated at 650 shp (480 kW). It has a dual-channel, full-authority digital engine-controller that operates at required power levels in all environments. Rolls-Royce proposed engine tweaks to raise output by 12%.

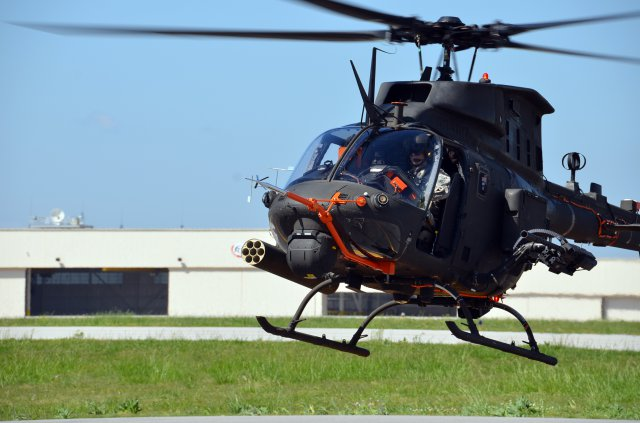
An OH-58F test aircraft in flight

In October 2012, the first OH-58F was finished. Unlike most military projects, the Army designed and built the new variant itself, which lowered development costs. It weighed 3,590 lb (1,630 kg), 53 lb (24 kg) below the target weight and about 200 lb (91 kg) lighter than the OH-58D. The weight savings are attributed to more efficient wiring and a lighter sensor. The first production aircraft began manufacturing in January 2013 and was handed over to the Army by year end. Low rate production was to start in March 2015, with the first operational squadron being fully equipped by 2016. The Army was to buy 368 OH-58Fs, with older OH-58 variants to be remanufactured. Due to battle damage and combat attrition, total OH-58F numbers were about 321 aircraft. The OH-58F's first flight occurred on 26 April 2013.

The Army chose to retire the Kiowa and end the CASUP upgrades. CASUP and SLEP upgrades were estimated to cost $3 billion and $7 billion respectively. The OH-58D could do 20 percent of armed aerial scout mission requirements. The OH-58F upgrade raised that to 50 percent. Replacing the Kiowa with Apaches and UAVs in scout roles met 80 percent of requirements. In early 2014, Bell received a stop-work order for the Kiowa CASUP program.

=== OH-58F Block II ===
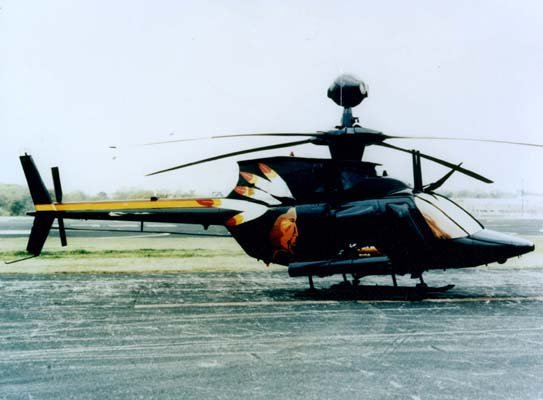
An OH-58X, a modified OH-58D prototype. Note nose, pitch link cover and engine cowl area.

In April 2011, Bell performed the successful first flight of the OH-58F Block II variant. It was Bell's entry in the Armed Aerial Scout (AAS) program. It built on the improvements of the F-model, adding features such as the Honeywell HTS900 turboshaft engine, the transmission and main rotors of the Bell 407, and the tail and tail rotor of the Bell 427. Bell started flight demonstrations in October 2012.

Bell hoped for the Army to go with their service life extension models instead of the AAS program. The OH-58F is an "obsolescence upgrade", while the Block II was seen as the performance upgrade. This gave the Army financial flexibility, via the option of upgrading the Kiowa to the OH-58F and later continuing to the Block II when there were sufficient funds.

In late 2012, the Army recommended that the AAS program proceed. The Army ended the AAS program in late 2013. In light of sequestration budget cuts in 2013, it was decided that the $16 billion cost to buy new armed scout helicopters was too great.

=== Others ===
The OH-58X was a modification of the fourth development OH-58D (s/n 69-16322), with partial stealth features and a chin-mounted McDonnell Douglas Electronics Systems turret as a night piloting system, including a Kodak FLIR system with a 30-degree field of view. Avionics systems were consolidated and moved to the nose, making room for a passenger seat in the rear. No aircraft were produced.

== Operators ==
=== Current operators ===
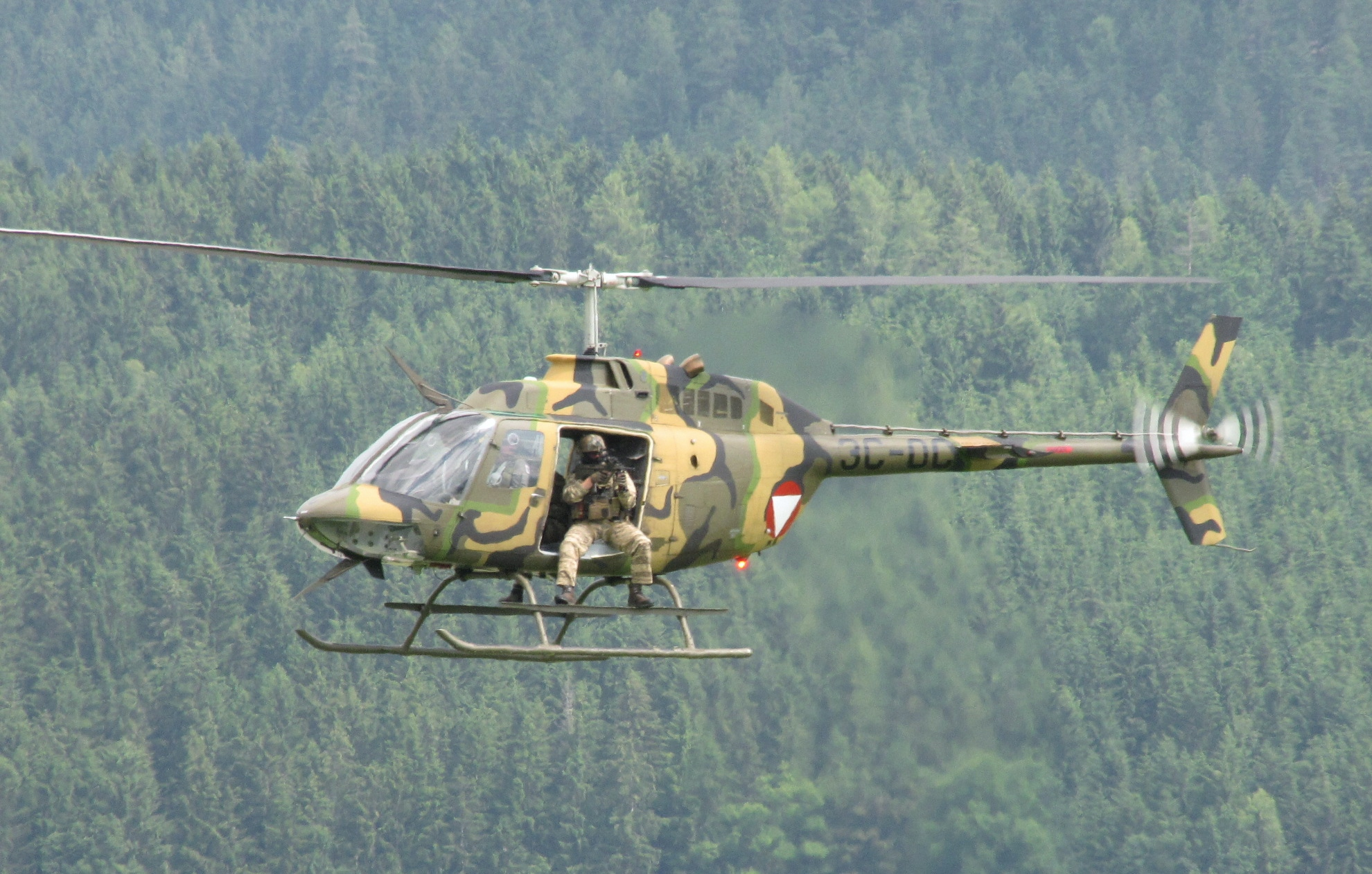
An Austrian Armed Forces OH-58, during AirPower 2013

Austria

- Austrian Air Force

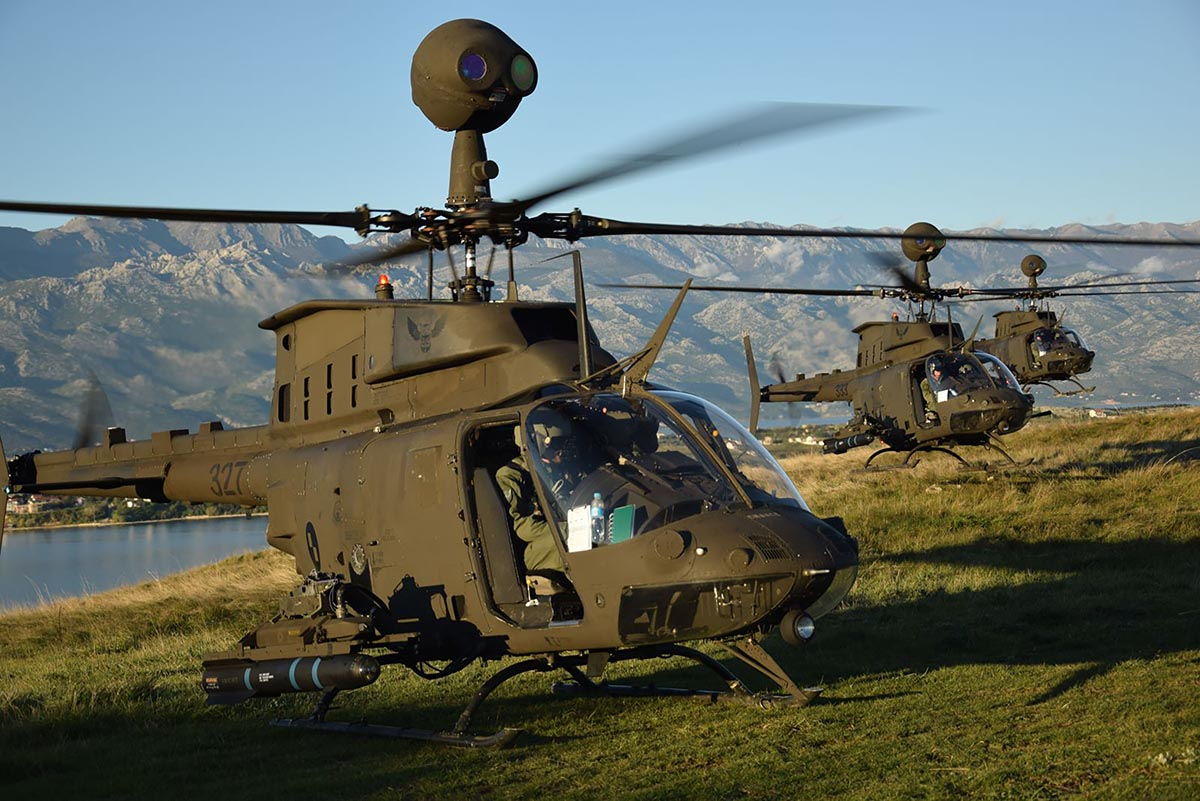
An OH-58D Kiowa Warrior of the Croatian Air Force

Croatia

- Croatian Air Force

Dominican Republic

- Dominican Air Force

Greece

- Hellenic Army

Iraq

- Iraqi Army Aviation Command

Saudi Arabia

- Royal Saudi Land Forces

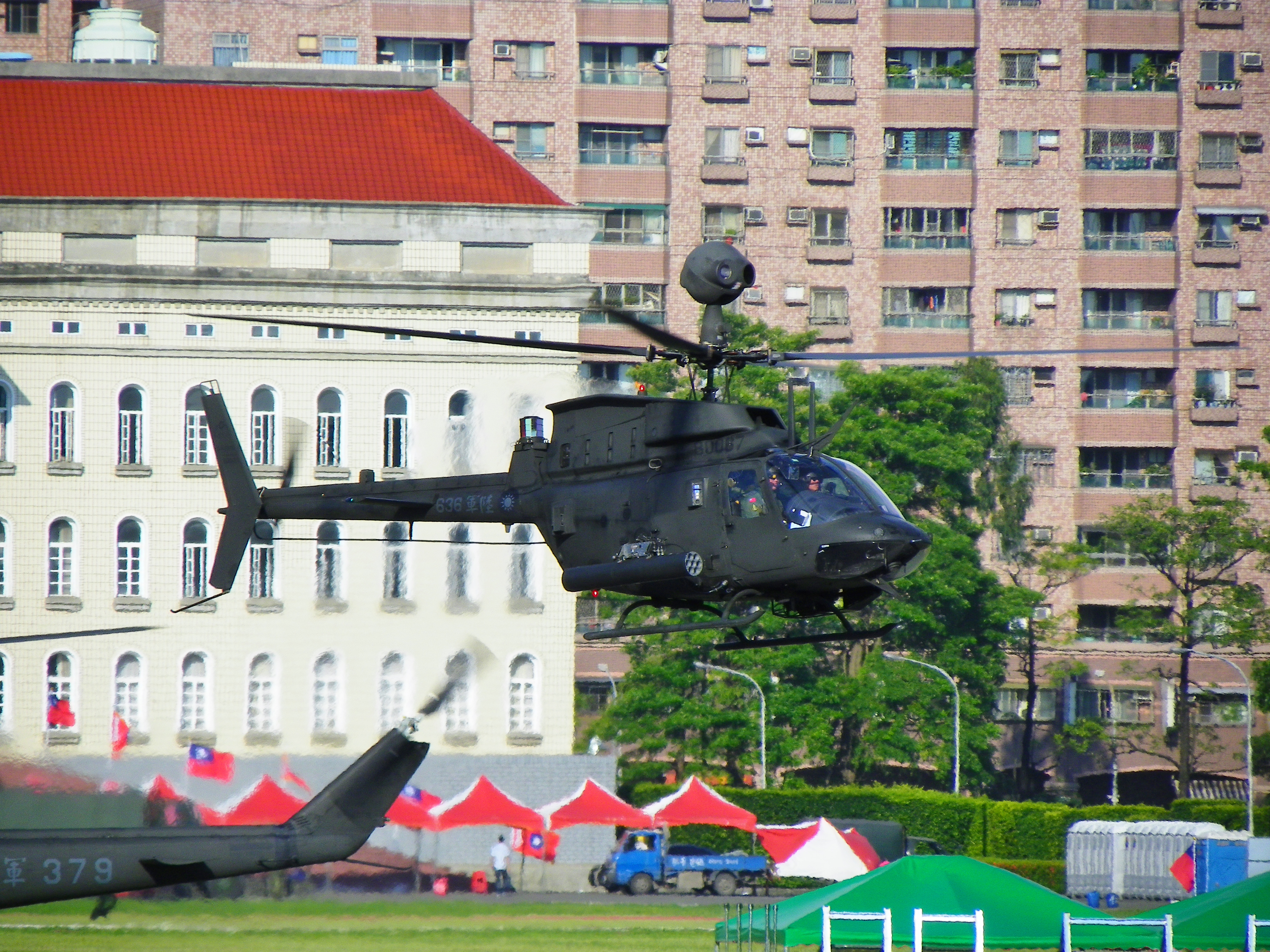
A Republic of China Army OH-58D taking off in 2014

Taiwan (Republic of China)

- Republic of China Army

Tunisia

- Tunisian Air Force

United States

- United States Navy - 3 OH-58s as of 2024

=== Former operators ===
Australia

- Australian Army

Canada

- Canadian Armed Forces

Spain

- Spanish Army
- Spanish Air and Space Force

Turkey

- Turkish Army

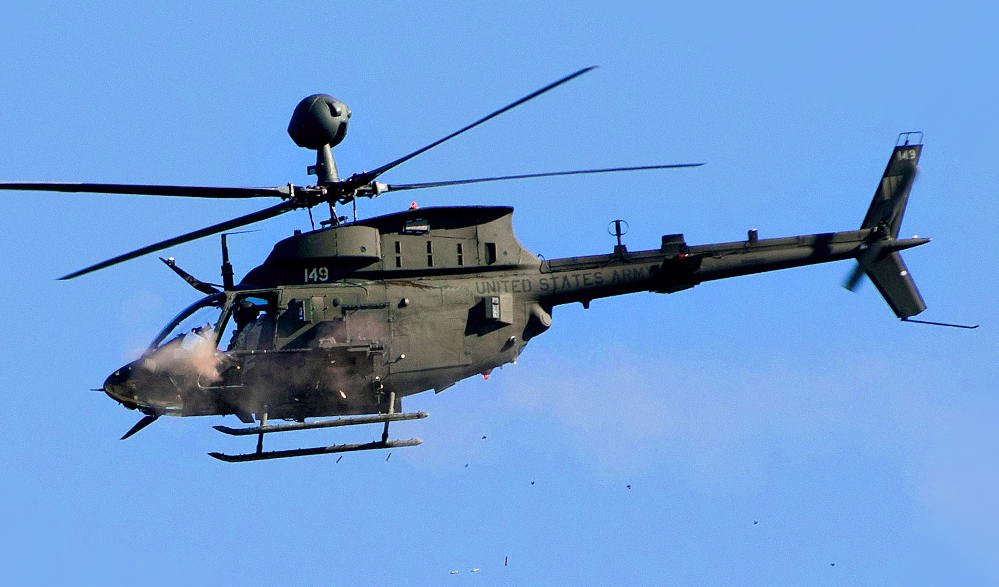
A United States Army Kiowa

United States

- United States Army

== Aircraft on display ==
- 68-16940 – International Airport in Palm Springs, California, U.S. Transformed into a sculpture.
- 69-16112 – OH-58A – Pima Air and Space Museum in Tucson, Arizona
- 69-16123 – Kansas Museum of Military History in Augusta, Kansas
- 69-16153 – MAPS Air Museum in North Canton, Ohio
- 69-16338 – Point Alpha Museum in Hesse, Germany
- 70-15423 - OH-58A – Zephyrhills Museum of Military History in Zephyrhills, Florida
- 71-20475 – Veterans Memorial Museum, Huntsville, Alabama
- 71-20869 – National Air Force Museum of Canada, Trenton, Ontario, Canada – CH-136
- 71-20920 – Polish Aviation Museum, Kraków, Poland – CH-136
- 72-21256 – The Aviation Museum of Kentucky in Lexington, Kentucky
- 93-0976 – OH-58D – Pima Air and Space Museum in Tucson, Arizona
- 95-0015 – OH-58D – (not on public display as of 2024) Pima Air and Space Museum in Tucson, Arizona
- A17-045 and A17-055 – CAC CA-32 – Moorabbin Air Museum in Melbourne, Victoria, Australia

== Specifications (OH-58D) ==
3-view line drawing of the Bell OH-58A

3-view line drawing of the Bell OH-58D

Data from Jane's All the World's Aircraft, 1996–97, U.S. Army Aircraft Since 1947

General characteristics

- Crew: 2 pilots
- Length: 42 ft 2 in (12.85 m)
- Height: 12 ft 10 in (3.93 m)
- Empty weight: 3,829 lb (1,737 kg)
- Gross weight: 5,500 lb (2,495 kg)
- Powerplant: 1 × Rolls-Royce T703-AD-700A turboshaft, 650 hp (485 kW)
- Main rotor diameter: 35 ft 0 in (10.67 m)
- Main rotor area: 962.11 sq ft (89.42 m^{2})

Performance

- Maximum speed: 149 mph (240 km/h, 129 kn)
- Cruise speed: 127 mph (204 km/h, 110 kn)
- Range: 161 mi (260 km, 140 nmi)
- Endurance: Two hours
- Service ceiling: 15,000 ft (4,575 m)

Armament

- Hardpoints: Two pylons , with provisions to carry combinations of:
  - Rockets: 1x LAU-68 rocket launcher with seven 70 mm (2.75 in) Hydra 70 or APKWS rockets
  - Missiles: 2x AGM-114 Hellfire missiles or air to air Stingers
  - Other: 1x .50 cal (12.7 mm) M3P (or M296) heavy machine gun

== See also ==
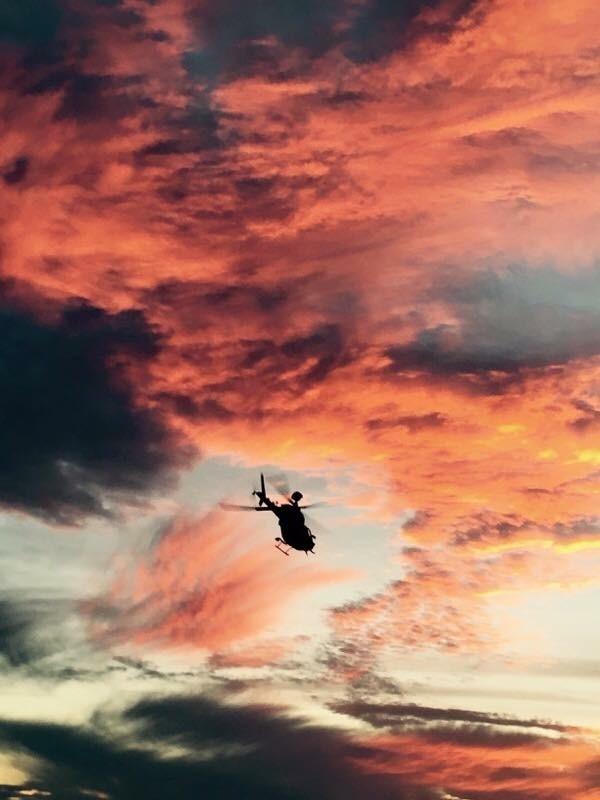
A Bell OH-58 on its last flight, after being retired

Related development

- Bell YOH-4
- Bell 206
- Bell 400
- Bell 407
- Bell ARH-70

Aircraft of comparable role, configuration, and era

- Hughes OH-6 Cayuse – (United States)
- MBB Bo 105 – (West Germany)
- Cicaré CH-14 – (Argentina)
- Mil Mi-36 – (Soviet Union)
- Changhe Z-11 – (China)
- Aérospatiale Gazelle – (France)

Related lists

- List of military aircraft of the United States
