= Lipno =

Lipno may refer to places:

== Bosnia and Herzegovina ==
- Lipno (Ljubuški), a village in the municipality of Ljubuški

== Czech Republic ==
- Lipno (Louny District), a municipality and village in the Ústí nad Labem Region
- Lipno, a village and part of Líšťany (Plzeň-North District) in the Plzeň Region
- Lipno nad Vltavou, a municipality and village in the South Bohemian Region
- Lipno Reservoir, a reservoir on the Vltava River in the South Bohemian Region

== Poland ==
- Lipno, Lipno County, a town in the Kuyavian-Pomeranian Voivodeship, seat of Lipno County, north-central Poland
- Lipno County
- Lipno, Gmina Lipno, Kuyavian-Pomeranian Voivodeship, a village in the Kuyavian-Pomeranian Voivodeship, north-central Poland
- Lipno, Świecie County, a village in the Kuyavian-Pomeranian Voivodeship, north-central Poland
- Lipno, Lublin Voivodeship, a village in the Lublin Voivodeship, east Poland
- Lipno, Łódź Voivodeship, a village in the Łódź Voivodeship, central Poland
- Lipno, Świętokrzyskie Voivodeship, a village in the Świętokrzyskie Voivodeship, south-central Poland
- Lipno, Łosice County, a village in the Łosice County, east-central Poland
- Lipno, Przysucha County, a village in the Masovian Voivodeship, east-central Poland
- Lipno, Greater Poland Voivodeship, a village in the Greater Poland Voivodeship, west-central Poland
- Lipno, Strzelce-Drezdenko County, a village in the Lubusz Voivodeship, west Poland
- Lipno, Zielona Góra County, a village in the Lubusz Voivodeship, west Poland
- Lipno, Opole Voivodeship, a village in the Opole Voivodeship, south-west Poland
- Lipno, Pomeranian Voivodeship, a village in the Pomeranian Voivodeship, north Poland
- Lipno, West Pomeranian Voivodeship, a village in the West Pomeranian Voivodeship, north-west Poland
- Lipno (lake), a lake in the Tuchola Forest, Pomeranian Voivodeship, north Poland
