= Świdnica (disambiguation) =

Świdnica is a city in Lower Silesian Voivodeship, Poland.

Świdnica may also refer to:

- Świdnica, Lubusz Voivodeship, village in Lubusz Voivodeship, Poland
- Świdnica County, unit of territorial administration in Lower Silesian Voivodeship
- Gmina Świdnica, Lower Silesian Voivodeship, administrative districts in Poland
- Gmina Świdnica, Lubusz Voivodeship, administrative districts in Poland
