= Piątki =

Piątki may refer to the following village:

- Piątki, Kuyavian-Pomeranian Voivodeship (north-central Poland)
- Piątki, Warmian-Masurian Voivodeship (northern Poland)
- Piątki, Polish name for Kazachye, Kaliningrad Oblast (Russia)
