= Gmina Świdnica =

Gmina Świdnica may refer to either of the following rural administrative districts in Poland:

- Gmina Świdnica, Lower Silesian Voivodeship
- Gmina Świdnica, Lubusz Voivodeship
