= Letnica =

Letnica may refer to:

- Letnica, Gdańsk, one of the quarters of the city of Gdańsk, Poland
- Letnica, Lubusz Voivodeship, a village in western Poland
- Letnica, West Pomeranian Voivodeship, a village in northwestern Poland
- Letnica, Viti, a village in southern Kosovo
- Letnica (river), a river of Poland

== See also ==
- Ohrid trout (Salmo letnica), a species of fish
- Letnitsa, a town in northern Bulgaria
