= Wirówek =

Wirówek may refer to the following places:

- Wirówek, Gmina Bojadła in Lubusz Voivodeship (west Poland)
- Wirówek, Gmina Świdnica in Lubusz Voivodeship (west Poland)
- Wirówek, Masovian Voivodeship (east-central Poland)
- Wirówek, West Pomeranian Voivodeship (north-west Poland)
