= Biskupin (disambiguation) =

Biskupin may refer to the following places in Poland:

- Biskupin, an archaeological site and reconstruction of an Iron Age settlement, in Kuyavian-Pomeranian Voivodeship (north-central Poland)
- Biskupin, Lower Silesian Voivodeship (south-west Poland)
- Biskupin, Lipno County in Kuyavian-Pomeranian Voivodeship (north-central Poland)
- Biskupin, Żnin County in Kuyavian-Pomeranian Voivodeship (north-central Poland)
