= MI-3 =

MI-3 may refer to:

- Mission: Impossible III
- Michigan's 3rd congressional district
- M-3 (Michigan highway)
- MI3, branch of British military intelligence
- Mil Mi-3 aircraft
- Xiaomi Mi3, a smartphone
- mi^{3} or cubic mile
- The Curse of Monkey Island (also known as Monkey Island 3), videogame
