= PZL SM-2 =

Utility helicopter model by PZL Swidnik

SM-2
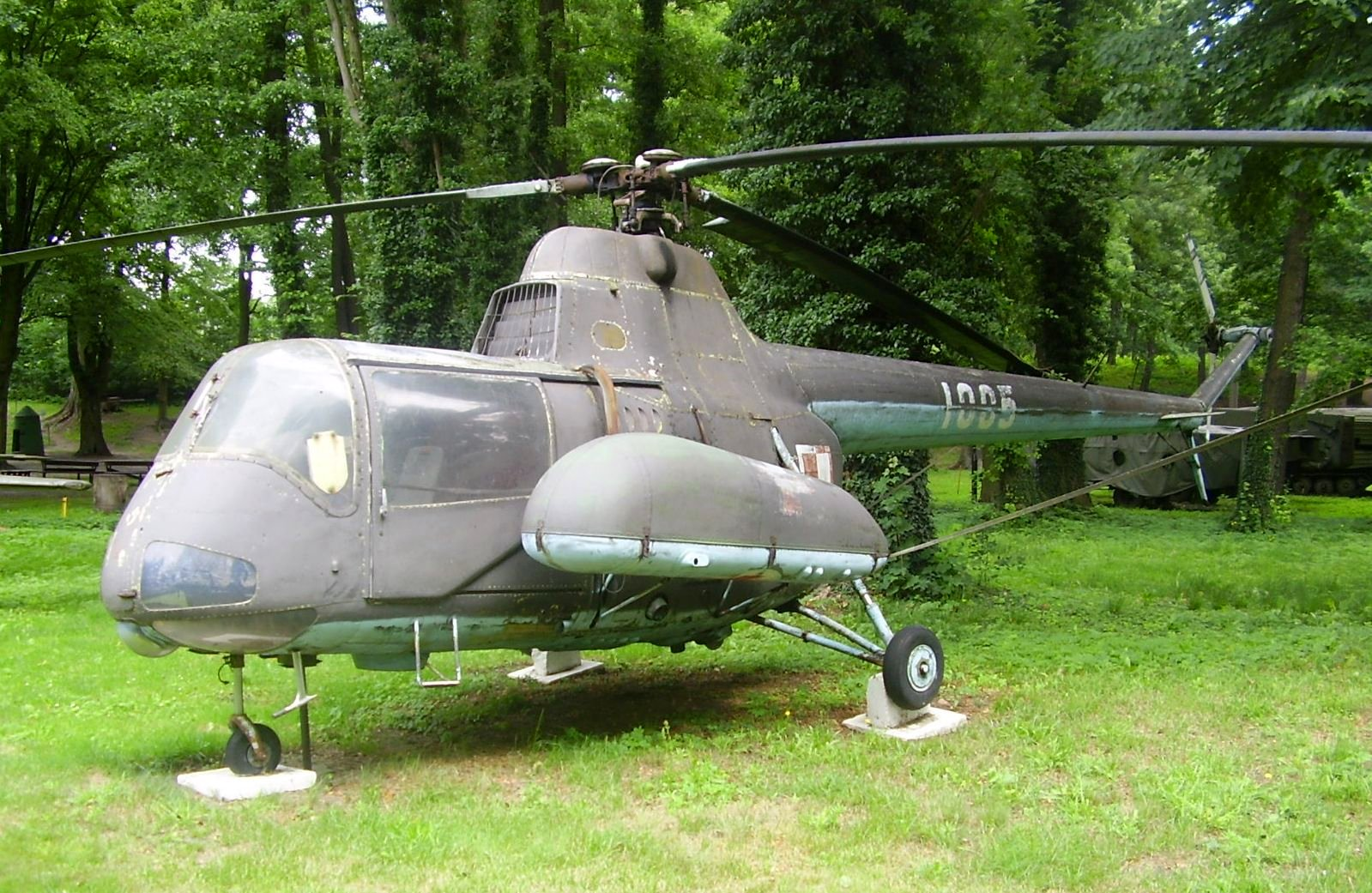
- SM-2 as military air ambulance in museum in Drzonów

General information
- Type: light utility helicopter
- Manufacturer: WSK PZL-Świdnik
- Primary user: Polish Air Force
- Number built: 86 + 3 prototypes

History
- Manufactured: 1960–1963
- Introduction date: 1961
- First flight: 18 November 1959
- Retired: 1981
- Developed from: Mil Mi-1

The PZL SM-2 was a Polish light utility helicopter, enlarged version of license-built Mil Mi-1, developed and produced by WSK PZL-Świdnik. It was also known as the WSK SM-2.

== Design and development ==
From 1956, the Soviet light three-seat or four-seat helicopter Mi-1 was produced under license in the Polish WSK PZL-Świdnik works in Świdnik, under a designation SM-1 – and as many as 1594 were manufactured. In 1957, works started in WSK PZL-Świdnik to modernize the helicopter and fit it with an enlarged, five-seat cabin. One of the design goals was to make training easier, by placing the two pilots side by side. In the air ambulance role, treating a patient inside the fuselage was easier than in side capsules. The helicopter's main designer was Jerzy Tyrcha.

The most obvious difference was a larger cabin, extended towards the front, but in fact most fuselage parts were reconstructed. The cabin had two wide side doors, sliding rearwards, being an improvement over the Mi-1, in which its automobile door could not be opened in flight and had to be removed for some purposes. Unchanged were: the engine, transmission and rotor, the fuselage boom and the landing gear (only early machines had different front wheel suspension). On contrary to the Mi-1, a headlight was movable. The prototype first flew on 18 November 1959. It appeared successful and a limited production started in 1960. Its take-off characteristics and performance were slightly worse than of Mi-1/SM-1: one of the reasons was an unsuitable carburetor intake, but this defect was improved only on some helicopters.

Only 86 helicopters were produced in four series, differing in details, plus three prototypes (some sources say 91 or 85). They were produced almost exclusively for Poland, while the SM-1 remained the main export product of Świdnik at that time. The helicopter was manufactured only in one variant, and could change its role to passenger, transport, air ambulance or flying crane.

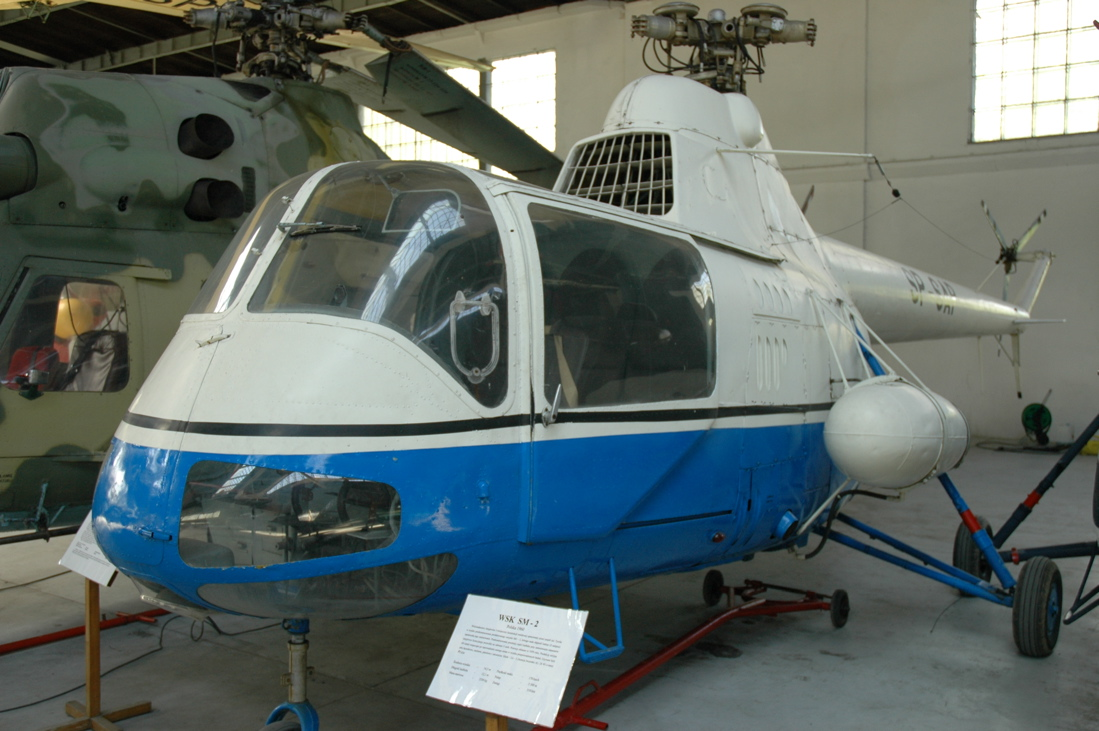
SM-2 in the Polish Aviation Museum in Kraków

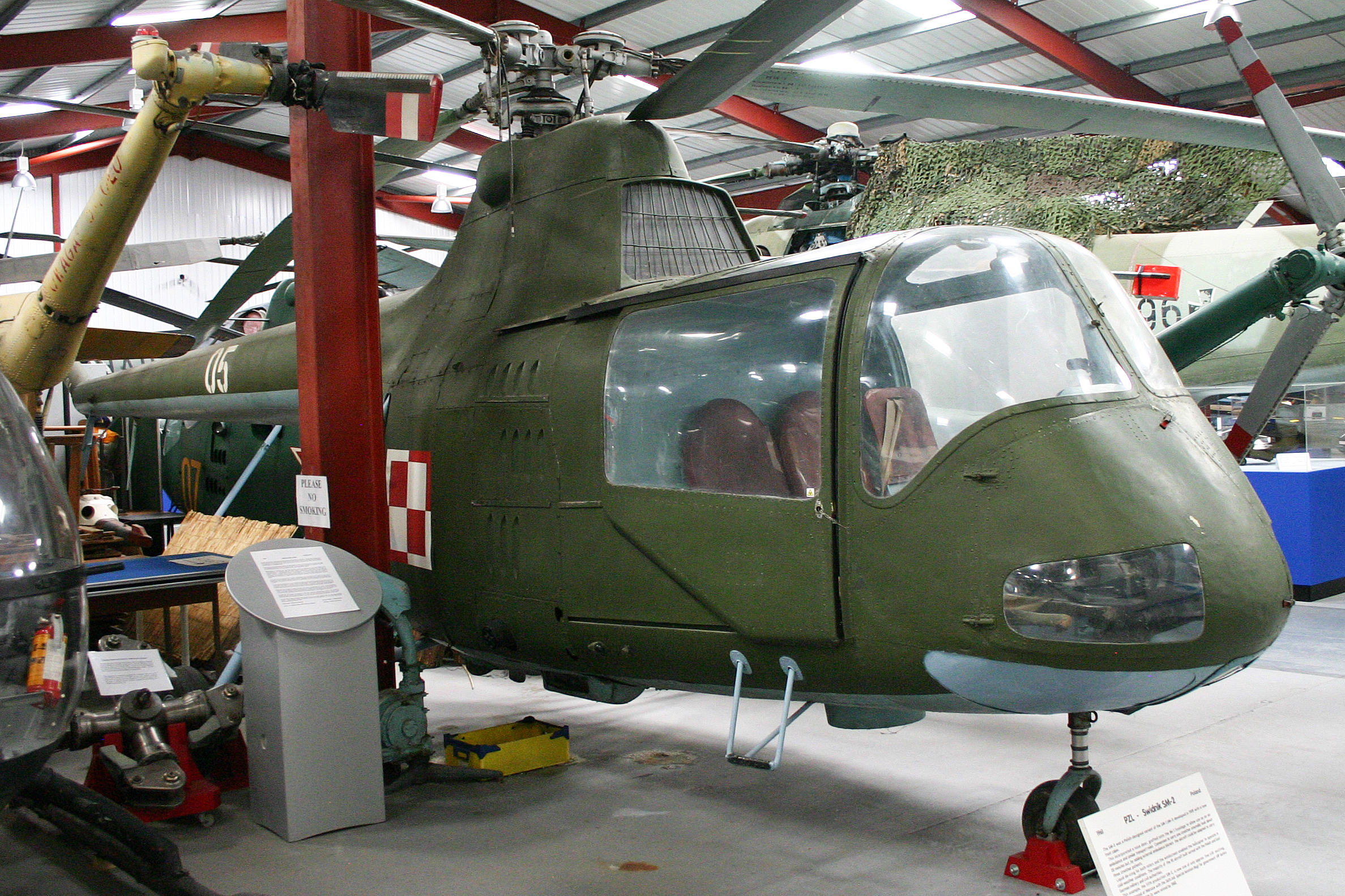
SM-2 in the Helicopter Museum, Weston-super-Mare. Visible is a hatch in a nose.

Basic variant had seats for three passengers on a rear bench and one seat next to a pilot. There were no double controls. In the air ambulance configuration, single stretchers were carried in the fuselage: loaded through a special hatch in a fuselage front, on the right side. A physician could sit behind the pilot, while other seats were removed. An additional two patients could be carried in detachable external closed capsules on either side of the fuselage, typical for Mi-1. All variants could carry additional 140 L external fuel tank on the left side, extending range to 500 km (it could not be used with side capsules). The crane variant (sometimes known as SM-2D) was used in limited numbers for search and rescue missions; it had a hydraulic winch that could lift 120 kg, in a place of a right front seat. After removal of all passenger seats, 320 kg of load could be carried. They had a durability of 600 flight hours, like contemporary SM-1 helicopters.

== Operational history ==
SM-2s were used mainly by Polish military aviation – 80 were delivered, between March 1961 and 1964. They were operated in small numbers by several units of the Polish Air Force and Polish Navy, mostly for liaison, artillery spotting, air ambulance tasks and others. In the Polish Navy they were used for search-and-rescue actions. This number included a flight assigned to the Internal Security Corps, later the Ministry of Internal Affairs (police aviation). Only two ex-military SM-2 (registration numbers SP-SXY and SP-SXZ) and the second prototype were used by a civilian air ambulance service. One helicopter remained in PZL-Świdnik factory (SP-SAP), and the other was acquired by the factory from the air force (SP-SFA). Most SM-2s were withdrawn in late 1970s and replaced with Mil Mi-2. The last one was withdrawn from the air force in 1981, and flew until 1983 (it was preserved in the factory).

Only five SM-2 were exported. One was sold to Czechoslovakia, used in 1963–70 by the Ministry of Internal Affairs (registration OK-BYK), then by Slov-Air until 1975 for internal transport (registration changed to OK-RUV). Four SM-2 were sold in 1963 to Romania, used by 1975 in the military aviation (the 94th Helicopter Regiment).

Four SM-2s are preserved in museums in Poland: in Polish Aviation Museum in Kraków, in Museum of Polish Arms in Kołobrzeg, Drzonów and Dęblin. Apart from museums there exist SM-2 in a collection in Góraszka and in PZL Świdnik factory. One is preserved at the Helicopter Museum, Weston-super-Mare, in the United Kingdom. Two other SM-2 are preserved in the Czech Republic (Prague Aviation Museum) and Romania (aviation museum in Bucharest) - both are stored (as of 2016).

== Operators ==
Czechoslovakia

- Czechoslovak Air Force
- Ministry of Internal Affairs
  - Czechoslovak National Security Guard
- Slov-Air

Poland

- Border Defence Forces
- Ministry of Internal Affairs (police aviation)
- Polish Air Force
- Polish Navy

Romania

- Romanian Air Force

== Specifications ==
Data from Jane's All The World's Aircraft 1965–66

General characteristics

- Crew: 1
- Capacity:
  - 4 passengers or
  - 1 stretcher and one attendant or
  - 3 stretchers (1 internal, 2 in external nacelles)
- Length: 16.97 m (55 ft 8 in) (overall length)
- Fuselage length: 12.08 m (39 ft 8 in)
- Height: 3.30 m (10 ft 10 in)
- Empty weight: 1,890 kg (4,167 lb)
- Max takeoff weight: 2,511 kg (5,536 lb) (air ambulance, 3 stretchers)
- Fuel capacity: 250 L (66 US gal; 55 imp gal) internal, provision for 150 L (40 US gal; 33 imp gal) external auxiliary tank
- Powerplant: 1 × Lit-3 (licensed Ivchenko AI-26V) 7-cylinder radial engine, 429 kW (575 hp)
- Main rotor diameter: 14.30 m (46 ft 11 in)
- Main rotor area: 160.6 m^{2} (1,729 sq ft)

Performance

- Maximum speed: 170 km/h (110 mph, 92 kn)
- Cruise speed: 130 km/h (81 mph, 70 kn)
- Range: 310 km (190 mi, 170 nmi)
- Ferry range: 500 km (310 mi, 270 nmi) with auxiliary fuel
- Service ceiling: 4,000 m (13,000 ft)
- Rate of climb: 4.50 m/s (885 ft/min)

== See also ==
Related development

- Mil Mi-1

Aircraft of comparable role, configuration, and era

- Westland Widgeon
