= Łochowo, Gmina Świdnica =

Łochowo
- Settlement
- Location within Poland
- Coordinates: 51°51′56″N 15°25′13″E
- Country: Poland
- Voivodeship: Lubusz
- County: Zielona Góra
- Gmina: Świdnica

Łochowo [wɔˈxɔvɔ] is a settlement in the administrative district of Gmina Świdnica, within Zielona Góra County, Lubusz Voivodeship, in western Poland.
