= Huta Głodowska =

- Village
- Location within Poland
- Coordinates: 52°49′N 19°15′E
- Country: Poland
- Voivodeship: Kuyavian-Pomeranian
- County: Lipno
- Gmina: Gmina Lipno

Huta Głodowska [ˈxuta ɡwɔˈdɔfska] is a village in the administrative district of Gmina Lipno, within Lipno County, Kuyavian-Pomeranian Voivodeship, in north-central Poland.
