= Piaski, Lubusz Voivodeship =

Piaski
- Village
- Location within Poland
- Coordinates: 51°51′24″N 15°21′49″E
- Country: Poland
- Voivodeship: Lubusz
- County: Zielona Góra
- Gmina: Świdnica
- Time zone: UTC+1 (CET)
  - Summer (DST): UTC+2 (CEST)
- Postal code: 66-008
- Vehicle registration: FZI

Piaski (Polish pronunciation: [ˈpjaskʲi]) is a village in the administrative district of Gmina Świdnica, within Zielona Góra County, Lubusz Voivodeship, in western Poland.
