= Chlebowo, Lipno County =

Chlebowo
- Village
- Location within Poland
- Coordinates: 52°53′28″N 19°12′23″E
- Country: Poland
- Voivodeship: Kuyavian-Pomeranian
- County: Lipno
- Gmina: Gmina Lipno

Chlebowo ([xlɛˈbɔvɔ]; German: Laibwalde) is a village in the administrative district of Gmina Lipno, within Lipno County, Kuyavian-Pomeranian Voivodeship, in north-central Poland.
