= Złotopole, Kuyavian-Pomeranian Voivodeship =

Złotopole
- Village
- Location within Poland
- Coordinates: 52°52′14″N 19°9′6″E
- Country: Poland
- Voivodeship: Kuyavian-Pomeranian
- County: Lipno
- Gmina: Gmina Lipno

Złotopole [zwɔtɔˈpɔlɛ] is a village in the administrative district of Gmina Lipno, within Lipno County, Kuyavian-Pomeranian Voivodeship, in north-central Poland. As of 2011 its population is 92. 52.2% of the population is male while 47.8% is female.
