= Komorowo, Lipno County =

Komorowo
- Village
- Location within Poland
- Coordinates: 52°50′N 19°6′E
- Country: Poland
- Voivodeship: Kuyavian-Pomeranian
- County: Lipno
- Gmina: Gmina Lipno

Komorowo [kɔmɔˈrɔvɔ] is a village in the administrative district of Gmina Lipno, within Lipno County, Kuyavian-Pomeranian Voivodeship, in north-central Poland.
