= Głodowo, Lipno County =

Głodowo
- Village
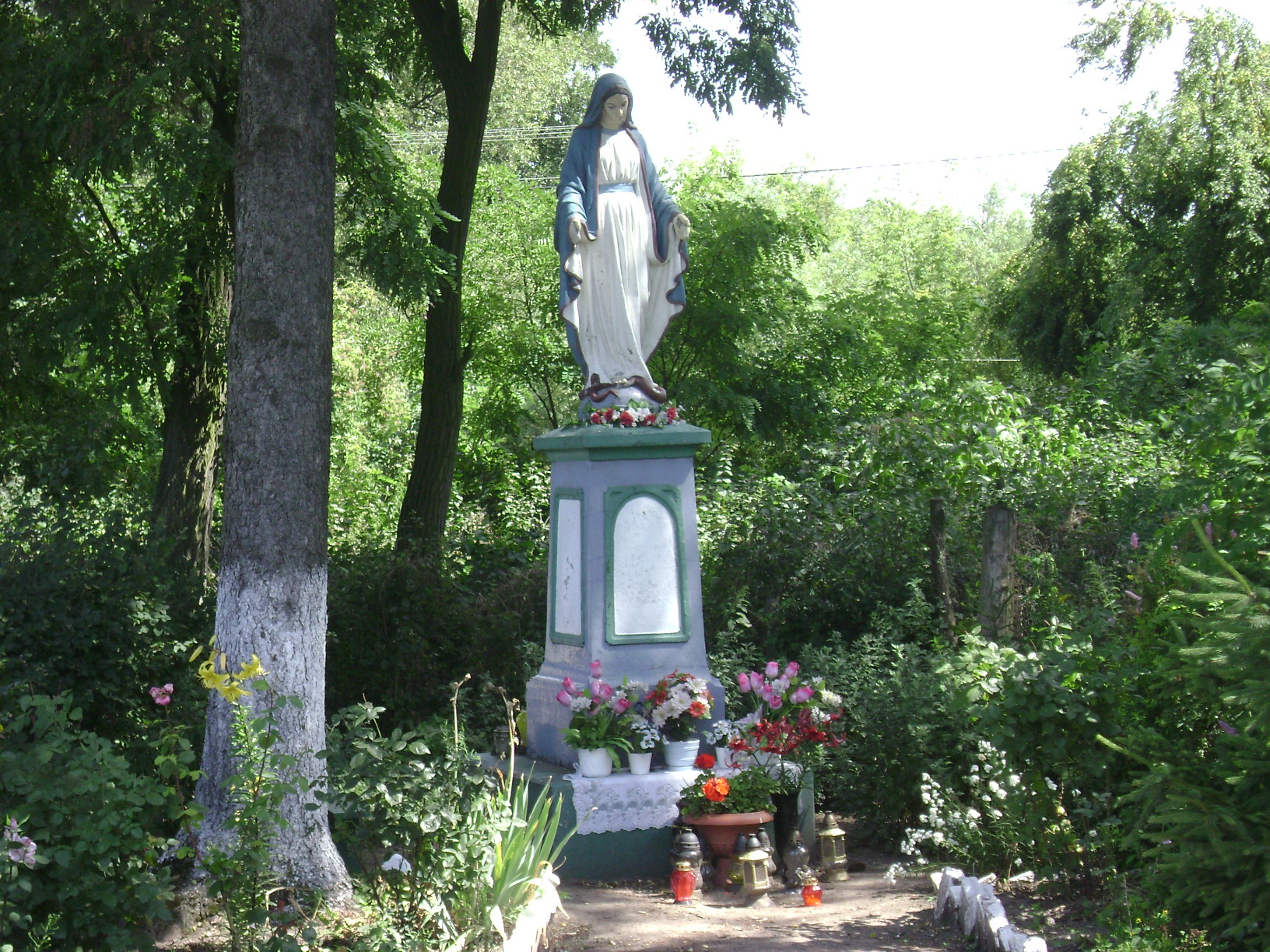

- Location within Poland
- Coordinates: 52°50′N 19°13′E
- Country: Poland
- Voivodeship: Kuyavian-Pomeranian
- County: Lipno
- Gmina: Gmina Lipno

Głodowo [ɡwɔˈdɔvɔ] is a village in the administrative district of Gmina Lipno, within Lipno County, Kuyavian-Pomeranian Voivodeship, in north-central Poland.
