= Mil Mi-1 =

Soviet light utility helicopter

Mi-1
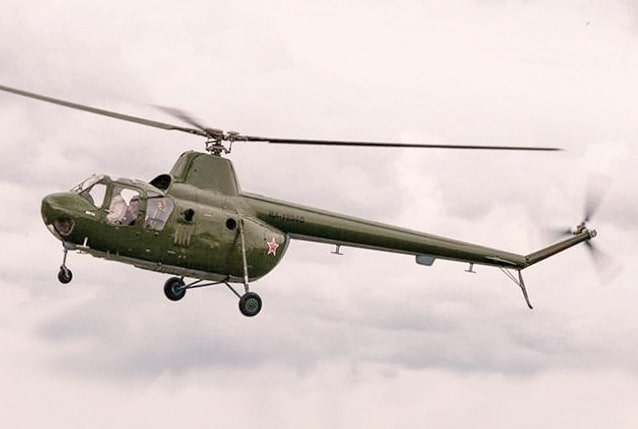
- Mil Mi-1 in flight

General information
- Type: Utility helicopter
- Manufacturer: Mil Moscow Helicopter Plant and other Soviet national plants, WSK PZL-Świdnik,
- Primary user: Soviet Air Force
- Number built: >2,594

History
- Manufactured: 1950–1965
- Introduction date: 1950
- First flight: 20 September 1948
- Variant: PZL SM-2

The Mil Mi-1 (USAF/DoD reporting name "Type 32", NATO reporting name "Hare") is a Soviet three- or four-seat light utility helicopter. It was the first Soviet helicopter to enter serial production. It is powered by one 575 hp (429 kW) Ivchenko AI-26V radial piston engine. It entered service in 1950 and was first seen on the 1951 Soviet Aviation Day, Tushino and was produced for 16 years. More than 1,000 were built in the USSR and 1,594 in Poland, as SM-1.

== Development ==
Mikhail Mil began work on rotary-winged aircraft before 1930, but the Mi-1, his first production helicopter, was begun in 1946, under a designation EG-1. In 1947 Mil became a head of OKB-4 design bureau in Tushino, and works were intensified. A final design was named GM-1 (for Gyelikopter Mila, Mil's Helicopter). Soviet engineers tried to create a completely original design. So, they made a rotor hub with spaced vertical and horizontal hinges. This design increased the efficiency of helicopter control and was much simpler than that used on American helicopters. The prototype completed first free flight on 20 September 1948 (pilot Mikhail Baikalov). In 1949 it underwent official state trials. Despite crashes of two prototypes, the design was an overall success, and after further work, was ordered for a production, under a new designation Mi-1, for Mil initials. The production was initially limited — the first series of only 15 machines was ordered on 21 February 1950, in factory No.3 in Moscow. Only after presentation to Joseph Stalin in 1951, the authorities decided to increase production. In 1952–1953, 30 Mi-1 were manufactured in Kazan, and from 1954 a mass production started in Orenburg and from 1956 in Rostov (current Rostvertol). The design was a subject of further improvements during production, mostly increasing reliability (especially as rotor technology was changing). Period between repair increased to 300 hours in Mi-1T (hence a letter T for trekhsotchasovoi, 300-hour), 600 in Mi-1A, then to 1,000 and 3,000 hours by the end of production.

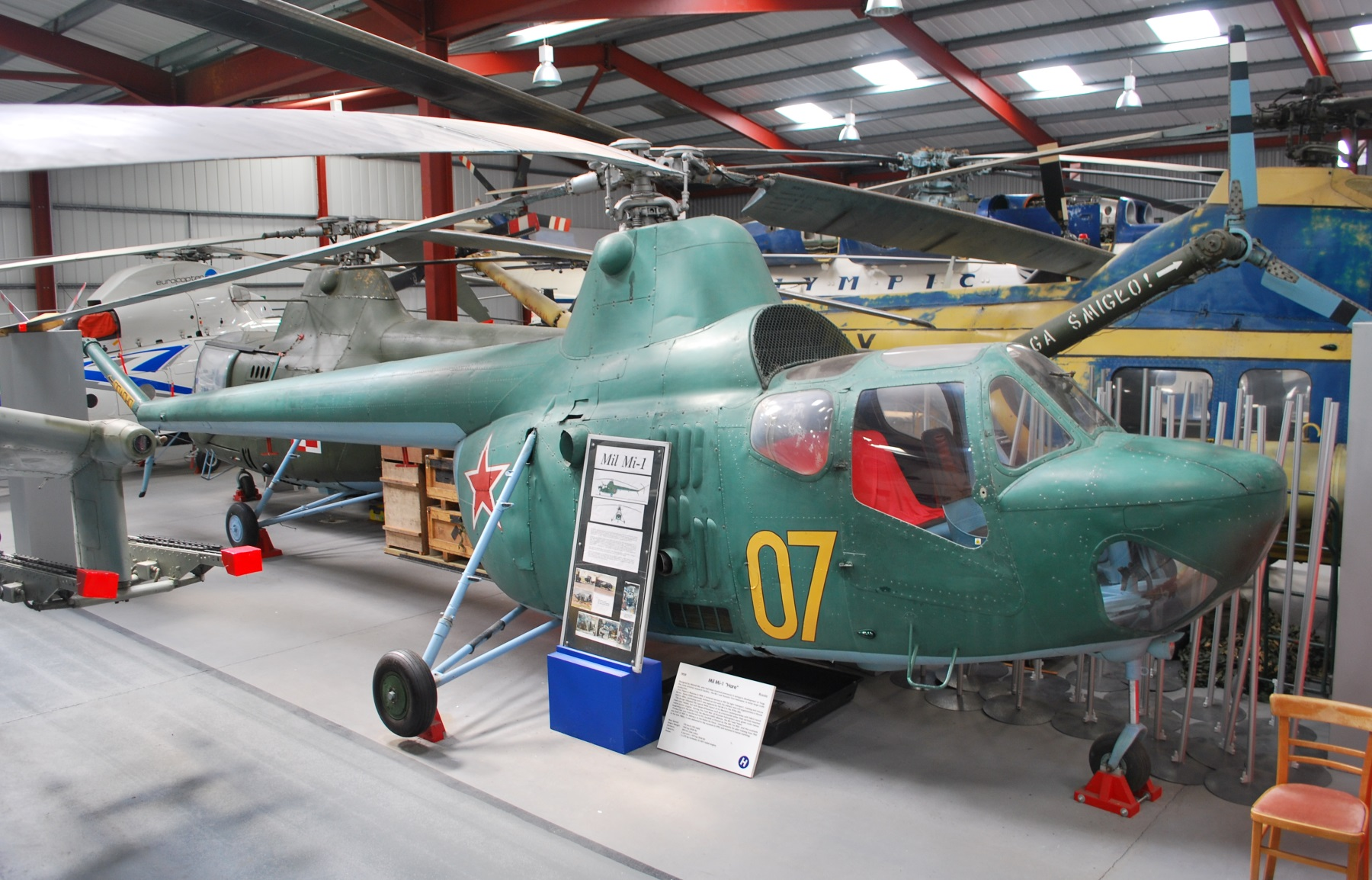
Early three-seater Mi-1 variant in The Helicopter Museum

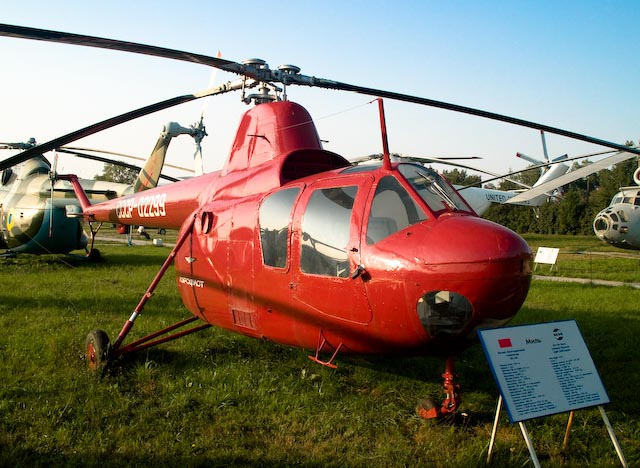
Mil Mi-1M

All early variants seated the pilot in front and two passengers behind him, in a common cabin. The first production variant was Mi-1, quickly replaced by improved Mi-1T, that carried extra operational equipment including full radio and blind-flying instruments, and had a more reliable engine, the AI-26V. The next basic variant was the Mi-1A of 1957, with further increased reliability and provisions for one 160 L external fuel tank.

A new major variant, Mi-1M in 1957 introduced an enlarged cabin and the more powerful AI-26VF engine, which allowed the accommodation of three passengers on a bench behind the pilot. Cabin height increased from 1.22 to 1.26 m and width from 1.01 to 1.2 m. A noticeable difference was horizontal bottom windows line instead of slanted, with bigger rear side windows, and a less pointed fuselage nose. It could also be fitted with two external side capsules for the injured or mail. There were trials of an armed anti-tank variant Mi-1MU carried in 1961, being the first Soviet attack helicopter, but it did not enter production due to having a small payload and the cessation of production of the basic variant.

Well over 1,000 of all variants were built in the USSR, including a proportion of dual-control trainers (with U suffix): Mi-1U, TU, AU, MU, with the instructor seated behind a trainee. 15 were produced in Moscow in 1950, 30 in Kazan in 1952–1953, 597 in Orenburg in 1954–1958 and 370 in Rostov in 1956–1960. In 1956, license-production of the four-seat model began in Poland, at WSK PZL-Świdnik, where 1,594 were built until 1965, under the designation SM-1. Several new versions were developed at Świdnik, including the SM-2 five-seater, with a new fuselage.

Several international records in its class were broken with the Mi-1 or SM-2.

== Variants ==
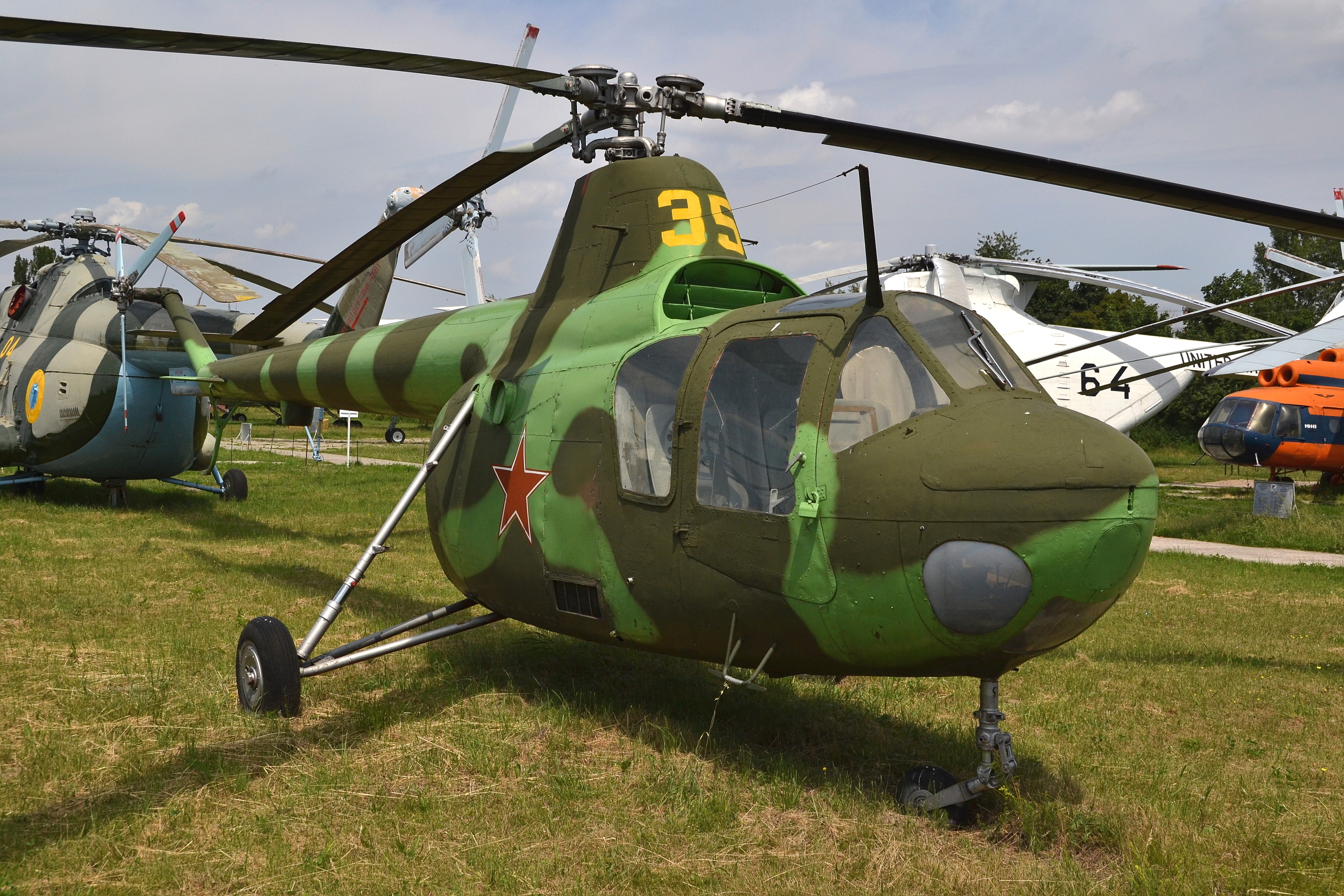
Soviet Mil Mi-1M

GM-1
The original designation of the Mil Mi-1 prototypes, powered by a AI-26GR 500–550 hp (370–410 kW) radial engine (later AI-26GRF).
Mi-1
Three-seat light general-purpose helicopter, seating a pilot and two passengers, powered by a AI-26GRF 575 hp (429 kW) radial piston engine. Initial production model.
Mi-1T

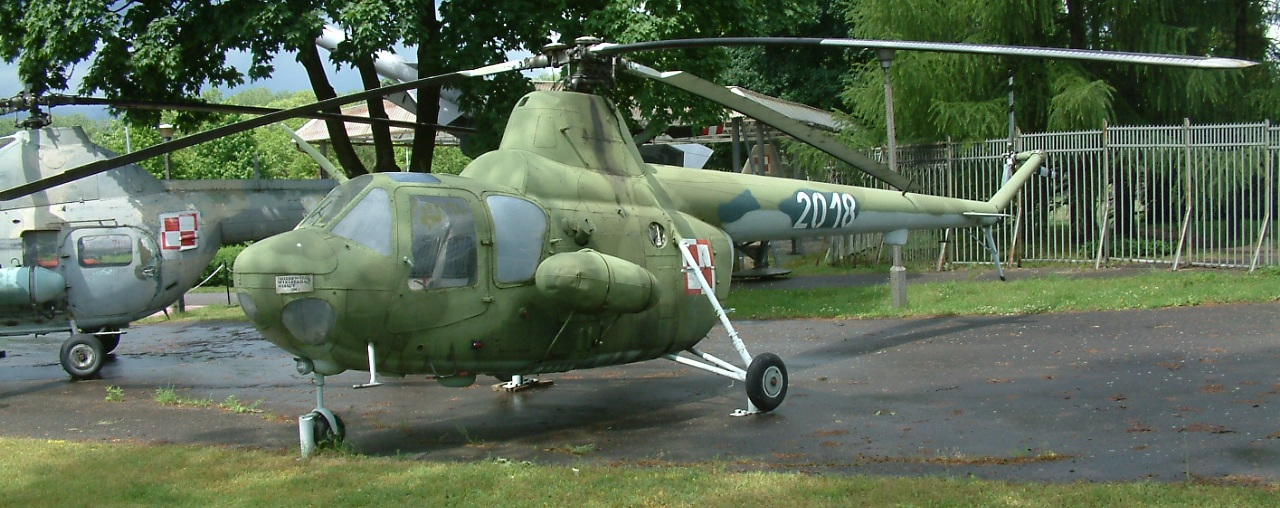
SM-1W (Polish produced Mi-1M)

Three-seat general-purpose transport helicopter, seating a pilot and two passengers, powered by a AI-26V radial piston engine.
Mi-1KR (TKR)
Light reconnaissance and liaison helicopter of 1956, basing on Mi-1T.
Mi-1NKh
Three-seat general-purpose utility helicopter, basing on Mi-1T. Designed to be used as an agricultural aircraft, air ambulance, passenger transport, air mail, freight transport helicopter (NKh—narodnoye khozyastvo—National Economy).
Mi-1A
Three-seat general-purpose transport helicopter of 1957, seating a pilot and two passengers, with increased reliability.
Mi-1AKR
Light reconnaissance and liaison helicopter, basing on Mi-1A.
Mi-1U/TU/AU/MU
Dual-control training helicopter variants (respectively, of basic Mi-1, T, A and M models).
Mi-1M
Four-seat light general-purpose helicopter of 1957, seating a pilot and three passengers. Visible changes are: raised roof above a cabin, blunter nose shape, and horizontal bottom windows' line instead of slanted.
Mi-1M Moskvich
Civil transport helicopter for Aeroflot, with better cabin soundproofing, equipped with hydraulic controls and an all-metal rotor.
Mi-1MNKh

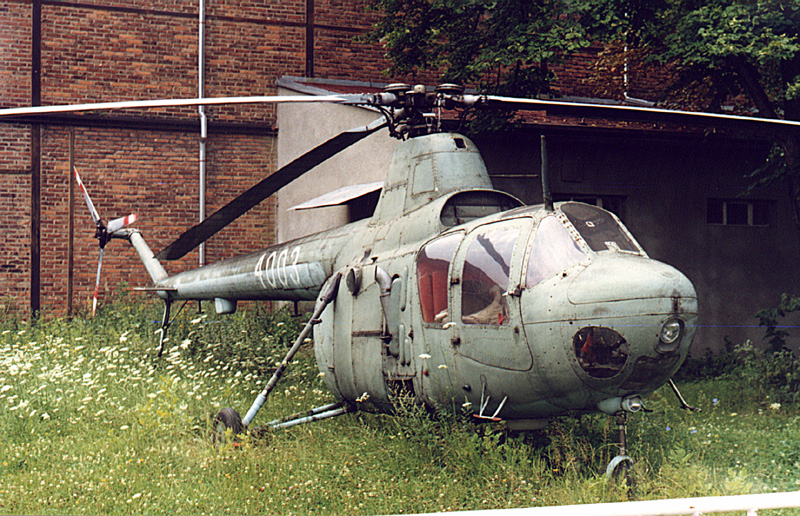
Four-seater Mi-1M

Four-seat general-purpose utility helicopter, basing on Mi-1M. Designed to be used as an agricultural aircraft, air ambulance, passenger transport, air mail, freight transport helicopter (NKh—narodnoye khozyastvo—National Economy).
Mi-1MG
Float-equipped version of the Mi-1M for whaling ships, of 1958 (2 made).
Mi-1MRK
Prototype of a liaison helicopter, basing on Mi-1M (razvedyvatelno-korrektirovochnoi—reconnaissance-artillery correcting), tested in 1960-1962.
Mi-1MU
Prototype of an armed variant, tested from 1961, with four 3M11 Falanga (AT-2) or six 9M14 Malyutka (AT-3) anti-tank missiles.
SM-1 (SM-1/300)
Polish production version, powered by a LiT-3 radial piston engine. The Mil Mi-1 helicopter built by WSK PZL-Świdnik under licence in Poland.
SM-1/600
Polish production version with increased reliability of 600 hours, of 1957 (factory designation).
SM-1Sz
Dual-control training helicopter.
SM-1W
Polish production version of the Mi-1M, of 1960.
SM-1Wb
Polish production version of the Mi-1M, of 1963, with increased reliability of 800 hours (factory designation).
SM-1WS
Air ambulance helicopter.

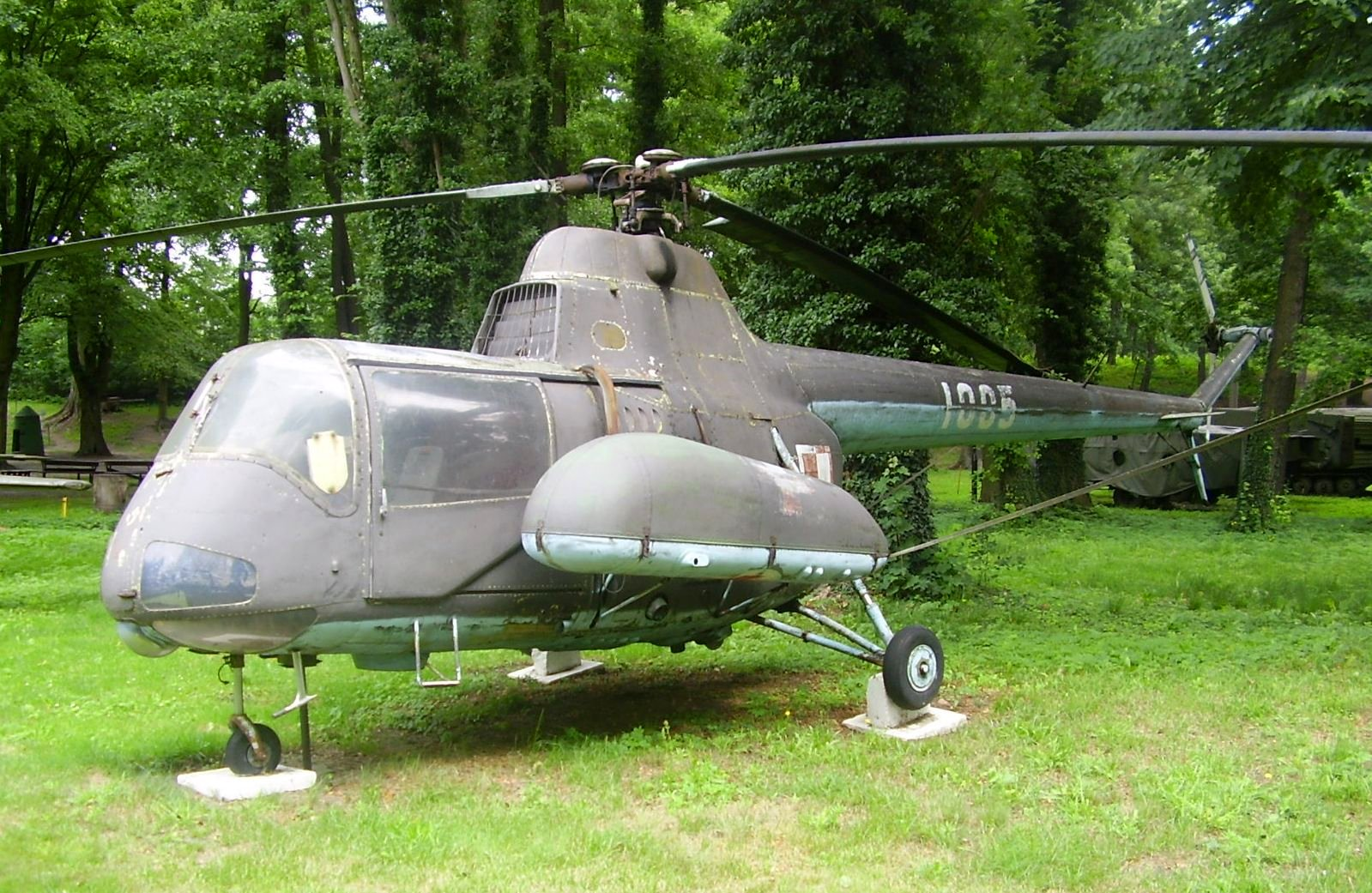
SM-2

SM-1WSz
Dual-control training helicopter.
SM-1WZ
Agricultural helicopter.
SM-2
Improved Polish version with a stretched fuselage, seating a pilot and four passengers.
Mi-3
Improved version with four bladed main rotor. Designation reused for a planned Mi-2 derivative.

== Operators ==
(Kingdom of Afghanistan) Afghanistan

- Afghan Air Force

Albania

- Albanian Air Force As of 2026, Mi-1 is retired from Albanian Air Force.

Algeria

- Algerian Air Force

(People's Republic of Bulgaria) Bulgaria

- Bulgarian Air Force

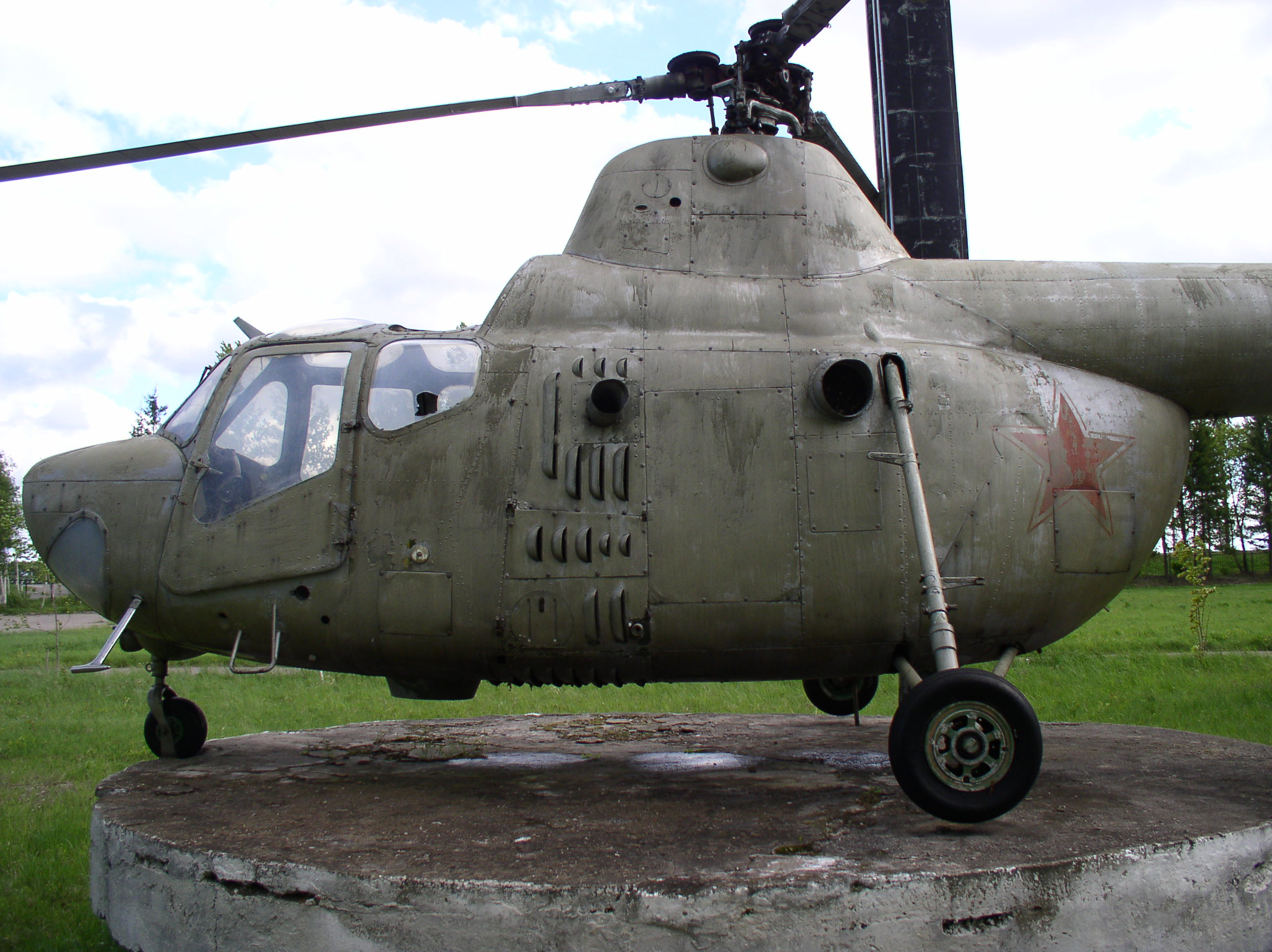
Some early three-seater Mi-1 variant

China

- People's Liberation Army Air Force

Cuba

- Cuban Air Force

Czechoslovakia

- Czechoslovak Air Force

East Germany

- East German Air Force

Egypt

- Egyptian Air Force

Finland

- Finnish Air Force

Mil Mi-1 of the Finnish Air Force

(Hungarian People's Republic) Hungary

- Hungarian Air Force

Indonesia

- Indonesian Air Force

Iraq

- Iraqi Air Force

Mongolia

- Mongolian Air Force

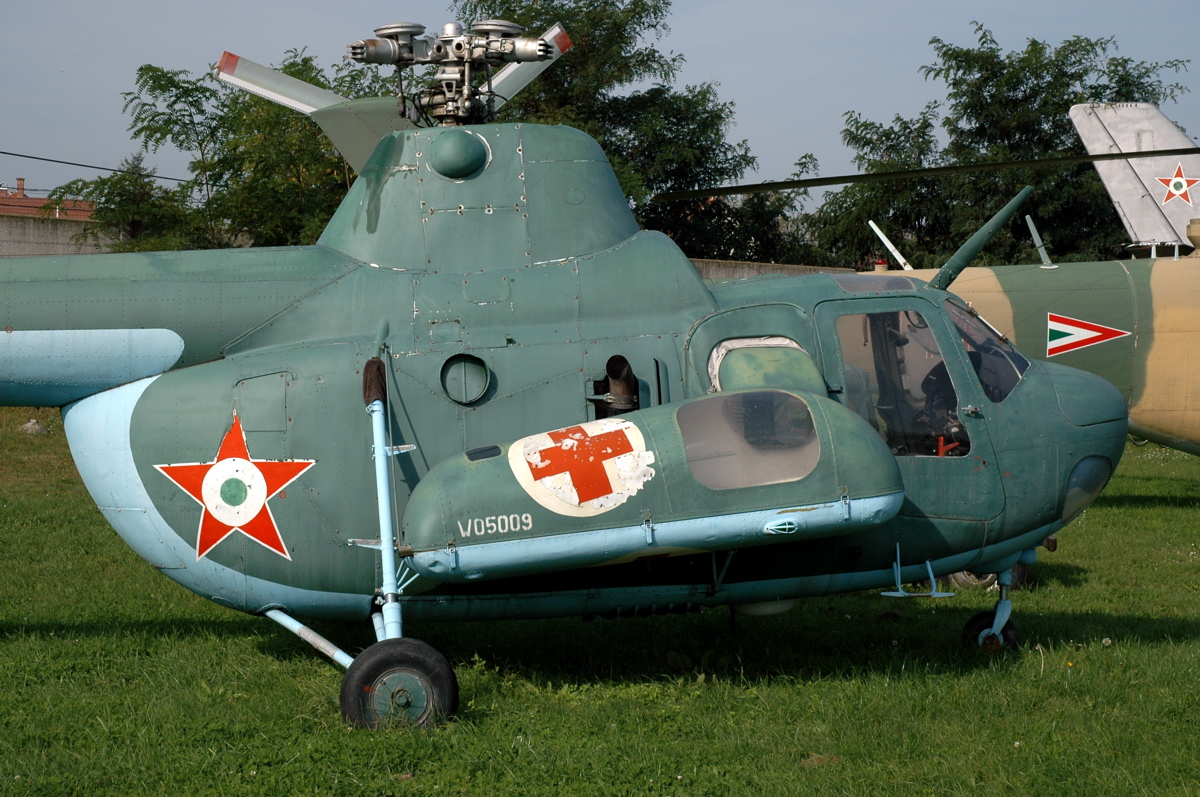
Mi-1M with side capsules for the injured

North Korea

- North Korean Air Force

(Polish People's Republic) Poland

- Polish Air Force

Socialist Republic of Romania

- Romanian Air Force

Soviet Union

- Aeroflot
- Soviet Air Force

Syria

- Syrian Air Force

United Arab Republic

- UAR Air Force

Vietnam

- North Vietnamese Air Force

Yemen

- Yemeni Air Force

== Specifications (SM-1W) ==
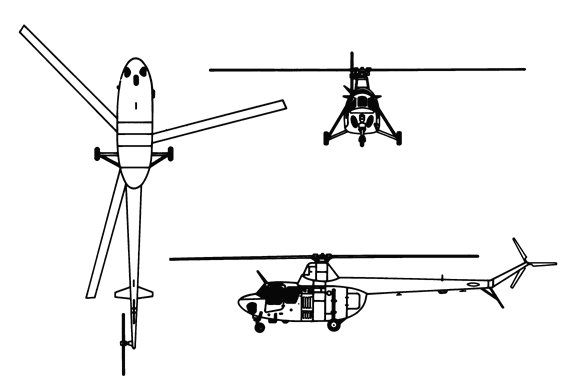
3-view line drawing of the Mil Mi-1

Data from Jane's All the World's Aircraft 1965–66

General characteristics

- Crew: 1
- Capacity: 3 passengers
- Length: 12.10 m (39 ft 8 in) (fuselage length), 17.00 m (55 ft 9 in) (overall length)
- Height: 3.30 m (10 ft 10 in)
- Airfoil: NACA 230 (rotor blades)
- Empty weight: 1,760 kg (3,880 lb)
- Max takeoff weight: 2,460 kg (5,423 lb)
- Fuel capacity: 240 L (63 US gal; 53 imp gal)
- Powerplant: 1 × Ivchenko AI-26V seven-cylinder air-cooled radial engine, 429 kW (575 hp)
- Main rotor diameter: 14.35 m (47 ft 1 in)
- Main rotor area: 161.7 m^{2} (1,741 sq ft)

Performance

- Maximum speed: 170 km/h (110 mph, 92 kn) at sea level
- Range: 600 km (370 mi, 320 nmi)
- Service ceiling: 3,000 m (9,800 ft)
- Rate of climb: 5.30 m/s (1,043 ft/min)

== See also ==
Related development

- Mil Mi-3

Aircraft of comparable role, configuration, and era

- Sikorsky H-5
- Bristol Sycamore
