= Barany, Kuyavian-Pomeranian Voivodeship =

Barany
- Village
- Location within Poland
- Coordinates: 52°47′52″N 19°4′16″E
- Country: Poland
- Voivodeship: Kuyavian-Pomeranian
- County: Lipno
- Gmina: Gmina Lipno
- Population: 220

Barany [baˈranɨ] is a village in the administrative district of Gmina Lipno, within Lipno County, Kuyavian-Pomeranian Voivodeship, in north-central Poland.
