= Gmina Lipno, Kuyavian-Pomeranian Voivodeship =

Gmina Lipno Lipno Commune
- Gmina
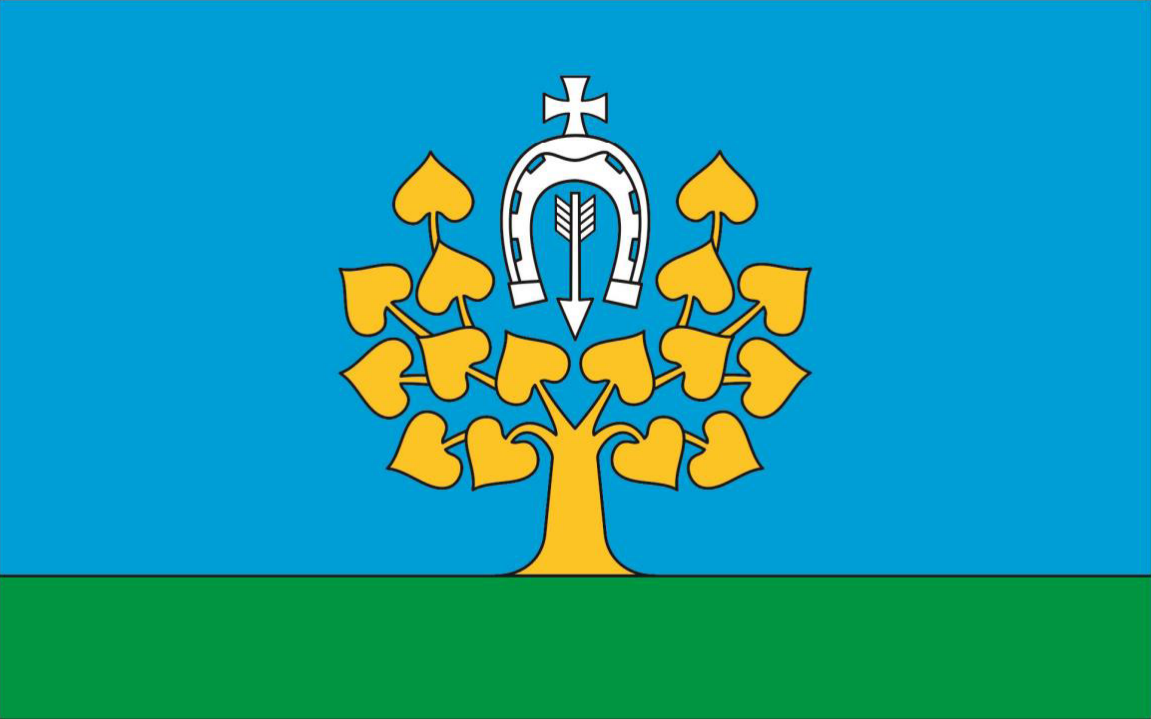
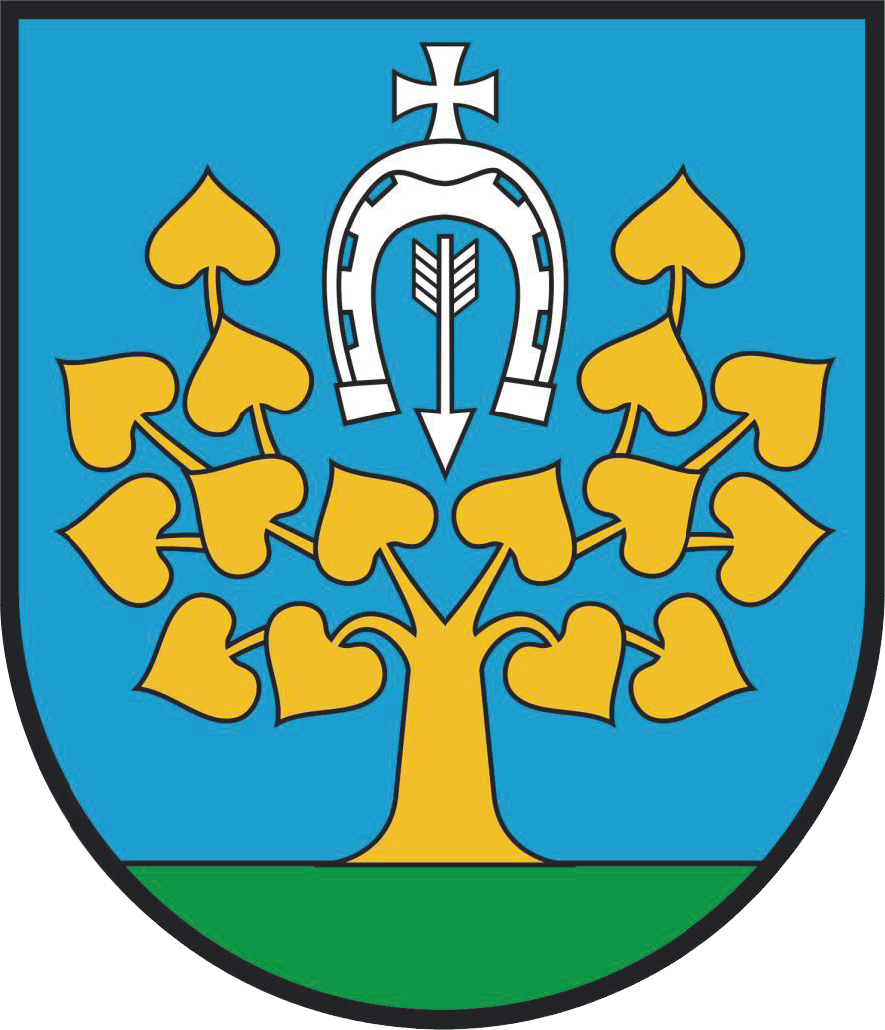
- Flag Coat of arms
- Interactive map of Gmina Lipno
- Coordinates (Lipno): 52°51′N 19°10′E
- Country: Poland
- Voivodeship: Kuyavian-Pomeranian
- County: Lipno
- Seat: Lipno

Area
  - Total: 209.72 km^{2} (80.97 sq mi)

Population (2006)
  - Total: 11,337
  - Density: 54.058/km^{2} (140.01/sq mi)
- Website: http://www.lipno.nowoczesnagmina.pl/

Gmina Lipno is a rural gmina (administrative district) in Lipno County, Kuyavian-Pomeranian Voivodeship, in north-central Poland. Its seat is the town of Lipno, although the town is not part of the territory of the gmina.

The gmina covers an area of 209.72 square kilometres (81.0 sq mi), and as of 2006 its total population is 11,337.

== Villages ==
Gmina Lipno contains the villages and settlements of Barany, Białowieżyn, Biskupin, Brzeźno, Chlebowo, Chodorążek, Głodowo, Grabiny, Huta Głodowska, Ignackowo, Jankowo, Jastrzębie, Karnkowo, Karnkowskie Rumunki, Kłokock, Kolankowo, Komorowo, Krzyżówki, Lipno, Łochocin, Maliszewo, Okrąg, Ośmiałowo, Ostrowite, Ostrowitko, Piątki, Popowo, Radomice, Rumunki Głodowskie, Tomaszewo, Trzebiegoszcz, Wichowo, Wierzbick, Zbytkowo and Złotopole.

== Neighbouring gminas ==
Gmina Lipno is bordered by the town of Lipno and by the gminas of Bobrowniki, Chrostkowo, Czernikowo, Fabianki, Kikół, Skępe and Wielgie.
