= Joseph Ignatius Ritter =

German historian (1787–1857)

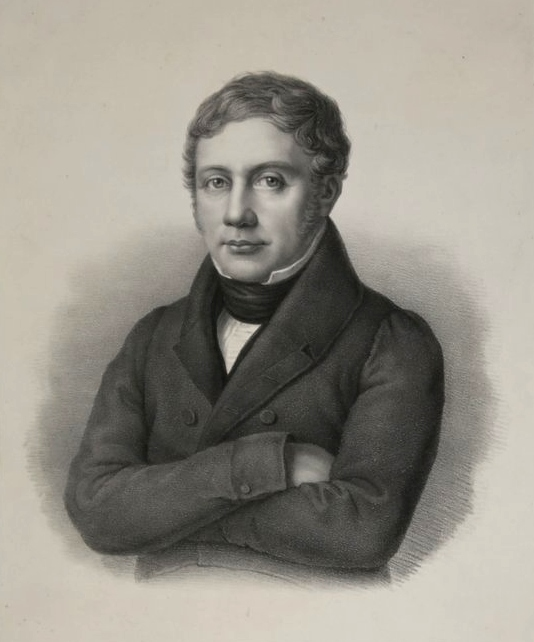
Joseph Ignaz Ritter

Joseph Ignatius Ritter (12 April 1787, in Schweinitz, Silesia – 5 January 1857, in Breslau) was a German historian. He pursued his philosophical and theological studies at the University of Breslau, was ordained priest in 1811, and for several years was engaged in pastoral work.

== Biography ==
An annotated translation of St. John Chrysostom's treatise on the priesthood not only obtained for him the doctorate in theology, but also attracted the attention of the Prussian ministry, which in 1823 named him ordinary professor of church history and patrology at the University of Bonn. Here he made the acquaintance of George Hermes, and became favorably disposed towards his system.

In 1830 he was named professor and canon in Breslau. As administrator of this diocese (1840–43), he abandoned his earlier Hermesian tendencies for a staunch Catholic policy, notably in the question of mixed marriages. Later he published tracts defending the Church against the attacks of Johannes Ronge, the founder of the German Catholics. His principal writings which bear on church history and canon law are:

- Handbuch der Kirchengeschichte (Elberfeld and Bonn, 1826–33; sixth edition by Ennen, Bonn, 1862)
- Irenicon oder Briefe zur Förderung des Friedens zwischen Kirche u. Staat, Leipzig, 1840;
- Der Capitularvicar, Münster, 1842;
- Geschichte der Diöcese Breslau, Breslau, 1845.
- With J. W. J. Braun he brought out a new edition of Pellicia's work, De Christianae ecclesiae politia, Cologne, 1829–38.
