= Buchałów =

- Village
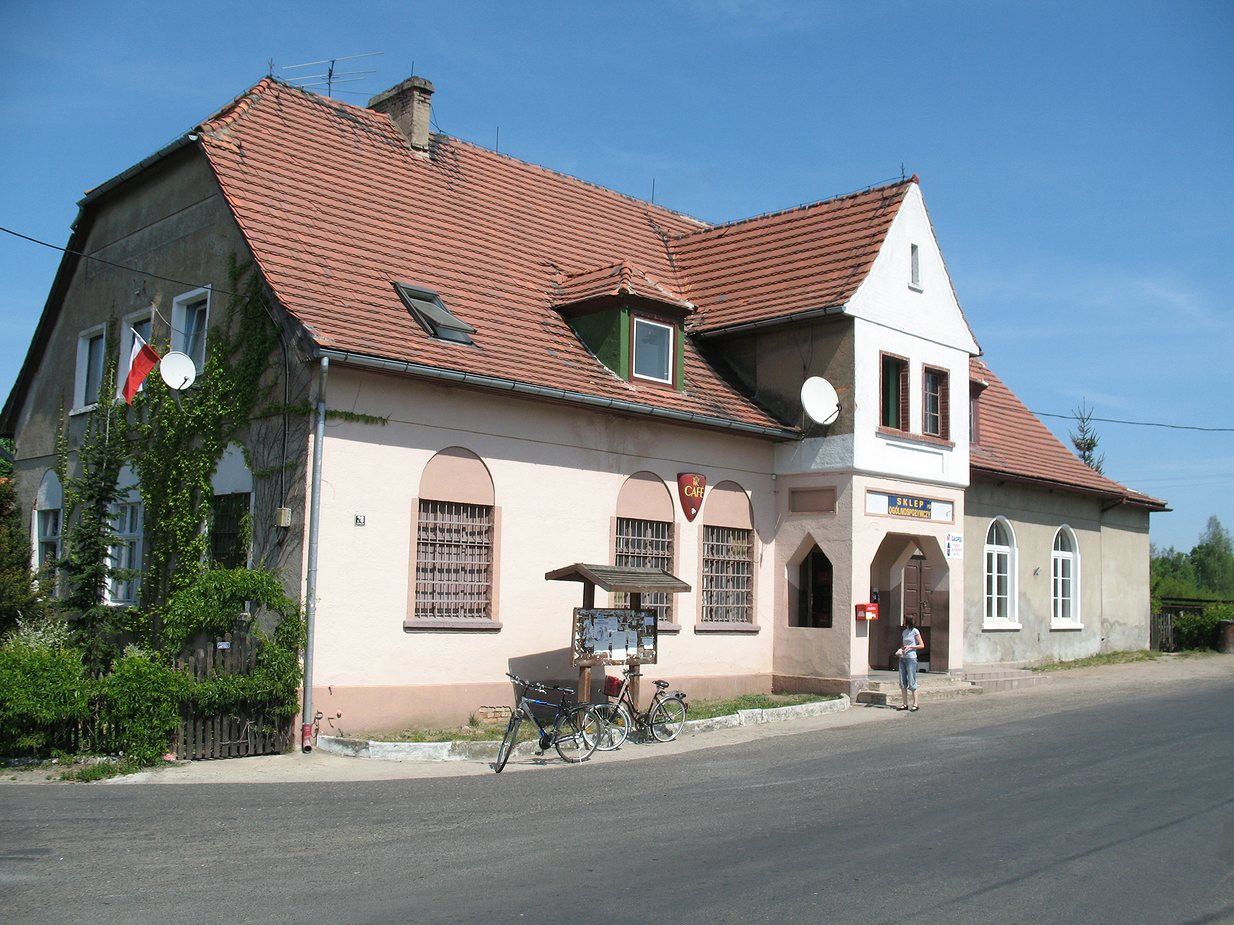
- A shop in Buchałów, formerly an inn

- Location within Poland
- Coordinates: 51°54′37″N 15°21′31″E
- Country: Poland
- Voivodeship: Lubusz
- County: Zielona Góra
- Gmina: Świdnica

Buchałów [buˈxawuf] is a village in the administrative district of Gmina Świdnica, within Zielona Góra County, Lubusz Voivodeship, in western Poland.
