= Radomia =

- Village
- Location within Poland
- Coordinates: 51°56′32″N 15°21′19″E
- Country: Poland
- Voivodeship: Lubusz
- County: Zielona Góra
- Gmina: Świdnica
- Elevation: 100 m (330 ft)
- Population: 150

Radomia [raˈdɔmja] is a village in the administrative district of Gmina Świdnica, within Zielona Góra County, Lubusz Voivodeship, in western Poland.
