= Słone, Lubusz Voivodeship =

Słone
- Village
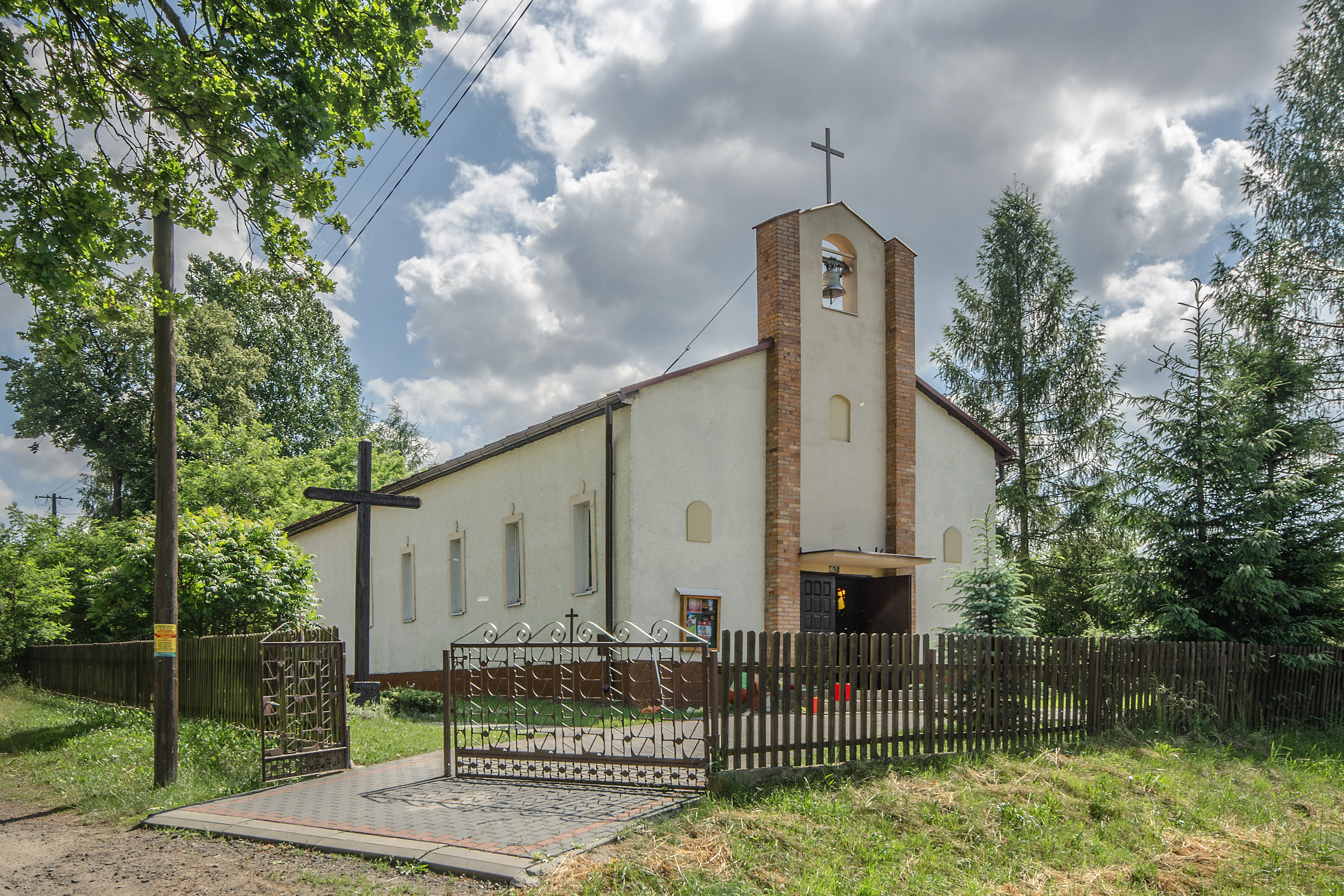

- Location within Poland
- Coordinates: 51°55′26″N 15°23′48″E
- Country: Poland
- Voivodeship: Lubusz
- County: Zielona Góra
- Gmina: Świdnica
- Population: 500

Słone [ˈswɔnɛ] is a village in the administrative district of Gmina Świdnica, within Zielona Góra County, Lubusz Voivodeship, in western Poland.
