= Grabowiec, Lubusz Voivodeship =

Grabowiec
- Village
- Location within Poland
- Coordinates: 51°53′41″N 15°16′37″E
- Country: Poland
- Voivodeship: Lubusz
- County: Zielona Góra
- Gmina: Świdnica

Grabowiec [ɡraˈbɔvjɛt͡s] is a village in the administrative district of Gmina Świdnica, within Zielona Góra County, Lubusz Voivodeship, in western Poland.
