= Bobrowniki Castle =

Coordinates: 52°46′46″N 18°56′50″E

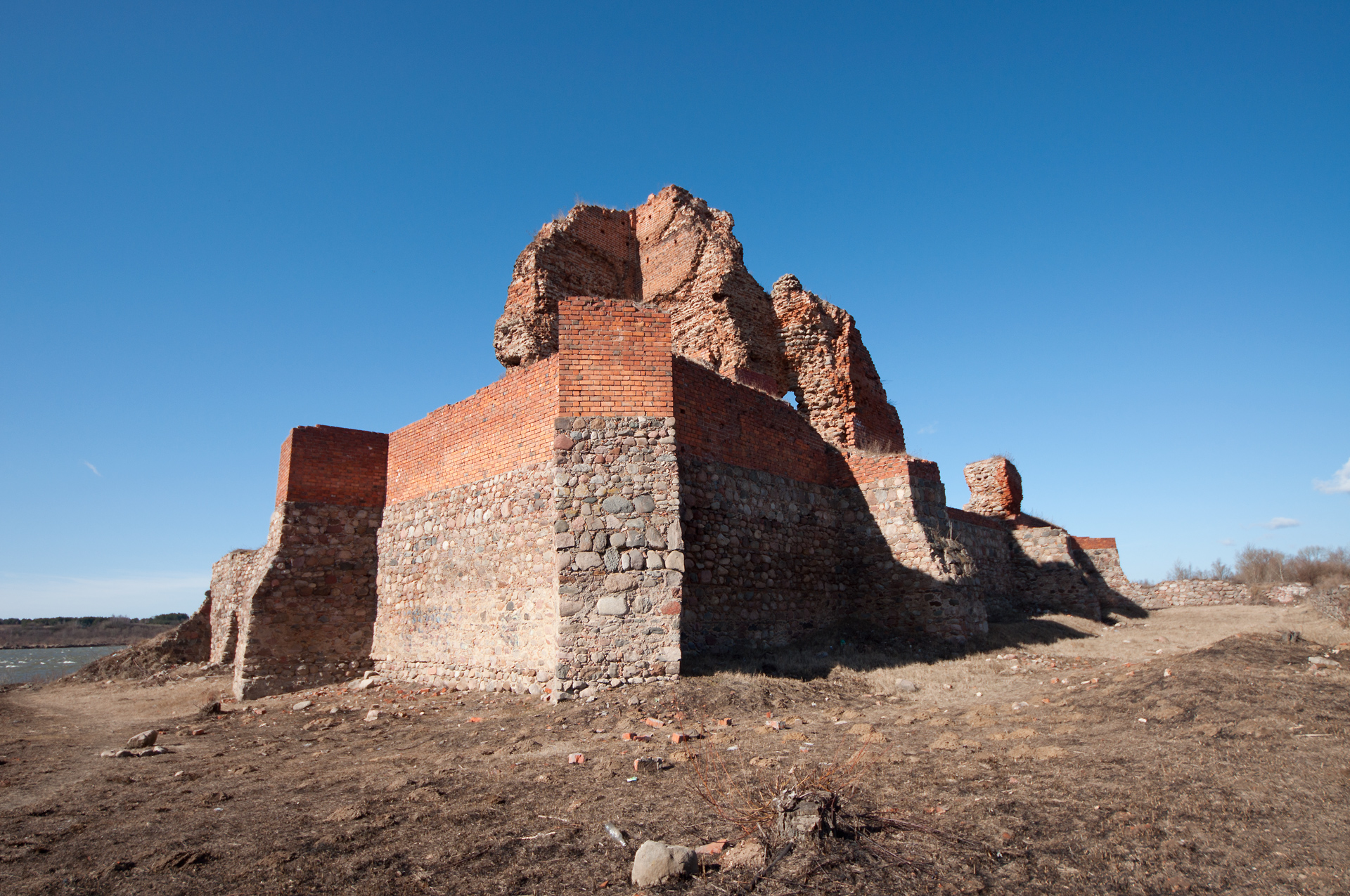
Ruins of the castle

Bobrowniki Castle was built by the Teutonic Knights in the late fourteenth, early fifteenth centuries. Following the Peace of Thorn (1411), it was taken over by the Polish, later to become a residence of the local mayor. Since the eighteenth century the castle lies in ruins.

== History ==
Bobrowniki castle was erected at the turn of the fourteenth and fifteenth centuries, after the purchase of Bobrowniki village by the Teutonic Knights in 1392, possibly as an extension of an earlier fortress. It was located on the site of an old stronghold, founded by the Duke of Dobrzyn, Ladislaus the Hump-backed. Due to the close proximity of the country border, the elders of Dobrzyń nad Wisłą constantly improved the fortifications around the castle, which became the seat of the local government.

In 1405 Wladyslaw Jagiello purchased Dobrzyn and Bobrowniki, but four years later the Teutonic Knights attacked the castle. With the help of the treason of the defending commander Bobrowniki castle went back into Teutonic hands only to be returned to the Polish in 1411. Its border location had once again become the cause of many investments in the modernization of the facility. However, it no longer played any military role in wars to come. During the Thirteen Years' War (1454–66) the castle served as a prison for captured Knights of the Teutonic Order. Changes of the national border ultimately deprived the building of any strategic role.

In the seventeenth century it was already devastated to the point of being abandoned by the local government. During the war with Sweden, in the second half of the eighteenth century, the structure was almost completely destroyed. In the nineteenth century it was formally decided to demolish the castle. The ruins do not have an owner to this day.

== Architecture ==
Little is known about the appearance of the fortress at the time of the Teutonic Knights or later. The object was probably two-winged (other sources say that it was a square), surrounded by walls and a moat, with one gate and a cylindrical tower. The only remains of the past splendor of the castle are elements of fortified walls and a sentry tower.

== See also ==
- Castles in Poland
