= Okrąg, Kuyavian-Pomeranian Voivodeship =

Okrąg
- Village
- Location within Poland
- Coordinates: 52°52′14″N 19°11′32″E
- Country: Poland
- Voivodeship: Kuyavian-Pomeranian
- County: Lipno
- Gmina: Gmina Lipno

Okrąg [ˈɔkrɔŋk] is a village in the administrative district of Gmina Lipno, within Lipno County, Kuyavian-Pomeranian Voivodeship, in north-central Poland.
