= Tomaszewo, Lipno County =

Tomaszewo
- Village
- Location within Poland
- Coordinates: 52°48′44″N 19°11′48″E
- Country: Poland
- Voivodeship: Kuyavian-Pomeranian
- County: Lipno
- Gmina: Gmina Lipno

Tomaszewo [tɔmaˈʂɛvɔ] is a village in the administrative district of Gmina Lipno, within Lipno County, Kuyavian-Pomeranian Voivodeship, in north-central Poland.
