= Dobra, Lubusz Voivodeship =

Dobra
- Settlement
- Location within Poland
- Coordinates: 51°54′39″N 15°18′42″E
- Country: Poland
- Voivodeship: Lubusz
- County: Zielona Góra
- Gmina: Świdnica

Dobra [ˈdɔbra] is a settlement in the administrative district of Gmina Świdnica, within Zielona Góra County, Lubusz Voivodeship, in western Poland.
