= Ośmiałowo =

- Village
- Location within Poland
- Coordinates: 52°49′54″N 19°7′56″E
- Country: Poland
- Voivodeship: Kuyavian-Pomeranian
- County: Lipno
- Gmina: Gmina Lipno

Ośmiałowo [ɔɕmjaˈwɔvɔ] is a village in the administrative district of Gmina Lipno, within Lipno County, Kuyavian-Pomeranian Voivodeship, in north-central Poland.
