= Ostrowite, Lipno County =

Ostrowite
- Village
- Location within Poland
- Coordinates: 52°46′55″N 19°9′32″E
- Country: Poland
- Voivodeship: Kuyavian-Pomeranian
- County: Lipno
- Gmina: Gmina Lipno
- Population: 300

Ostrowite [ɔstrɔˈvitɛ] is a village in the administrative district of Gmina Lipno, within Lipno County, Kuyavian-Pomeranian Voivodeship, in north-central Poland.
