= Popowo, Gmina Lipno =

Popowo
- Village
- Location within Poland
- Coordinates: 52°46′7″N 19°6′40″E
- Country: Poland
- Voivodeship: Kuyavian-Pomeranian
- County: Lipno
- Gmina: Gmina Lipno

Popowo ([pɔˈpɔvɔ]; German: Papenfeld) is a village in north-central Poland, in the administrative district of Gmina Lipno, within Lipno County, Kuyavian-Pomeranian Voivodeship.
