= Rumunki Głodowskie =

Village in Kuyavian-Pomeranian, Poland

- Village
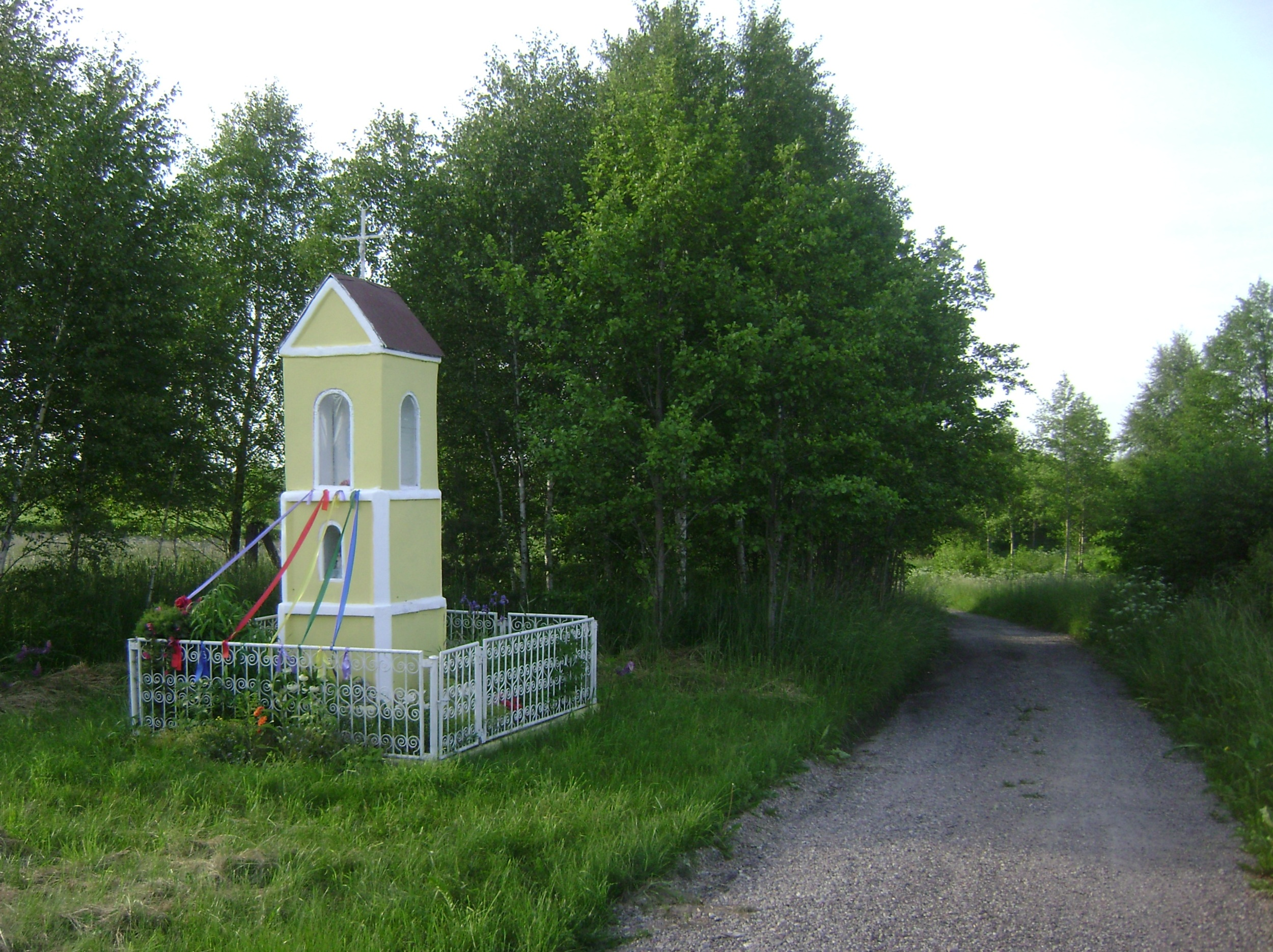

- Location within Poland
- Coordinates: 52°49′19″N 19°12′15″E
- Country: Poland
- Voivodeship: Kuyavian-Pomeranian
- County: Lipno
- Gmina: Gmina Lipno

Rumunki Głodowskie [ruˈmuŋki ɡwɔˈdɔfskʲɛ] is a village in the administrative district of Gmina Lipno, within Lipno County, Kuyavian-Pomeranian Voivodeship, in north-central Poland.
