= Rybno, Lubusz Voivodeship =

Rybno
- Settlement
- Location within Poland
- Coordinates: 51°55′42″N 15°27′20″E
- Country: Poland
- Voivodeship: Lubusz
- County: Zielona Góra
- Gmina: Świdnica

Rybno [ˈrɨbnɔ] is a settlement in the administrative district of Gmina Świdnica, within Zielona Góra County, Lubusz Voivodeship, in western Poland.
