= Radomice, Kuyavian-Pomeranian Voivodeship =

Radomice
- Village
- Location within Poland
- Coordinates: 52°49′N 19°8′E
- Country: Poland
- Voivodeship: Kuyavian-Pomeranian
- County: Lipno
- Gmina: Gmina Lipno
- Time zone: UTC+1 (CET)
  - Summer (DST): UTC+2 (CEST)
- Vehicle registration: CLI

Radomice [radɔˈmit͡sɛ] is a village in the administrative district of Gmina Lipno, within Lipno County, Kuyavian-Pomeranian Voivodeship, in north-central Poland.

== History ==
During the occupation of Poland (World War II), on October 8, 1939, the Germans carried out a massacre of 23 Polish farmers and farm workers from Radomice and Bobrowniki in the village (see also Nazi crimes against the Polish nation).
