= Orzewo =

- Settlement
- Location within Poland
- Coordinates: 51°56′29″N 15°21′24″E
- Country: Poland
- Voivodeship: Lubusz
- County: Zielona Góra
- Gmina: Świdnica
- Population: 150

Orzewo [ɔˈʐɛvɔ] is a settlement in the administrative district of Gmina Świdnica, within Zielona Góra County, Lubusz Voivodeship, in western Poland.
