= Koźla =

- Village
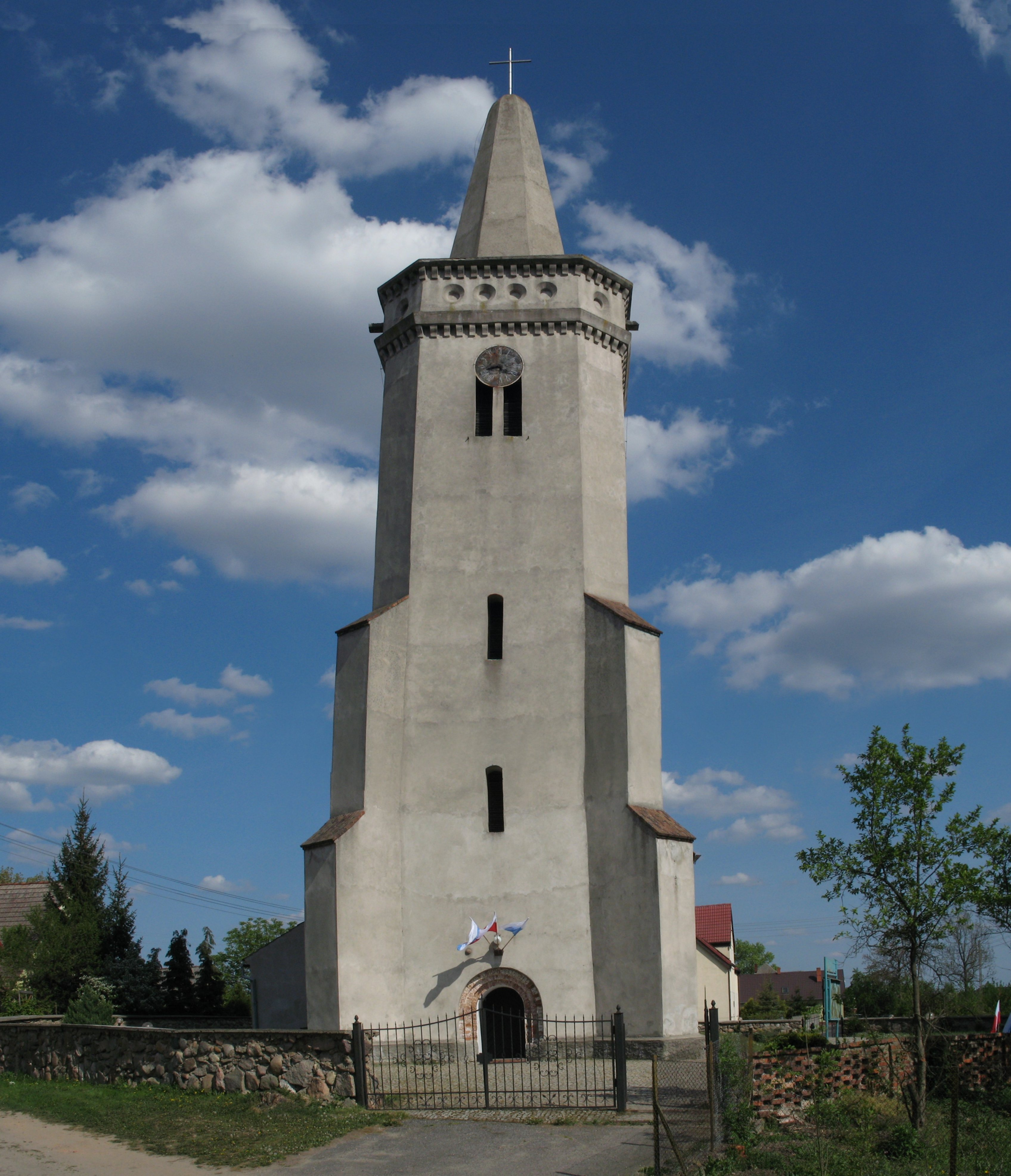
- The Catholic church in Koźla

- Location within Poland
- Coordinates: 51°52′N 15°18′E
- Country: Poland
- Voivodeship: Lubusz
- County: Zielona Góra
- Gmina: Świdnica
- Population: 780

Koźla [ˈkɔʑla] is a village in the administrative district of Gmina Świdnica, within Zielona Góra County, Lubusz Voivodeship, in western Poland.
