= Bobrowniki =

- Town
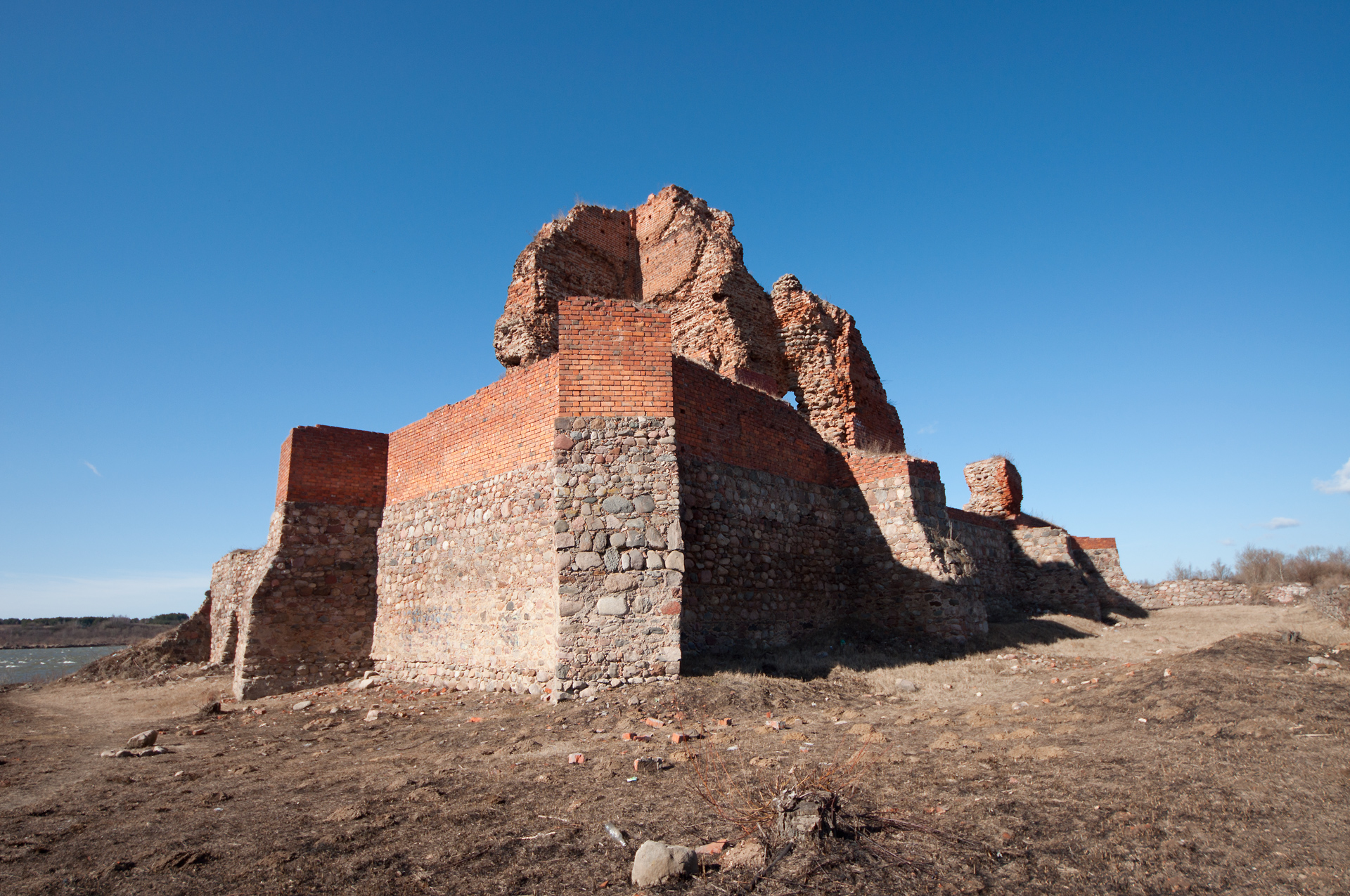
- Ruins of the castle

- Coat of arms

- Location within Poland
- Coordinates: 52°46′36″N 18°57′26″E
- Country: Poland
- Voivodeship: Kuyavian-Pomeranian
- County: Lipno
- Gmina: Bobrowniki

Population
  - Total: 980
- Time zone: UTC+1 (CET)
  - Summer (DST): UTC+2 (CEST)
- Vehicle registration: CLI
- Website: https://ugbobrowniki.pl/

Bobrowniki ([bɔbrɔvˈniki]) is a town in Lipno County, Kuyavian-Pomeranian Voivodeship, in central Poland. It is the seat of the gmina (administrative district) called Gmina Bobrowniki. In the Middle Ages the town was one of the centres of the Dobrzyń Land.

== History ==
The town contains ruins of the castle, built at the end of 14th century by Teutonic Knights at the place of a former Polish gród. Bobrowniki was a royal town, administratively located in the Lipno County in the Inowrocław Voivodeship in the Greater Poland Province of the Kingdom of Poland.

During the German occupation of Poland (World War II), several local farmers and activists were among the victimes of a massacre of Poles, perpetrated by the Germans in nearby Radomice on October 8, 1939 as part of the genocidal Intelligenzaktion campaign. Local Polish teachers were arrested and imprisoned in Włocławek, and two local school principals were sent to Nazi concentration camps and murdered there.
