= Świdnica, Lubusz Voivodeship =

Świdnica
- Village
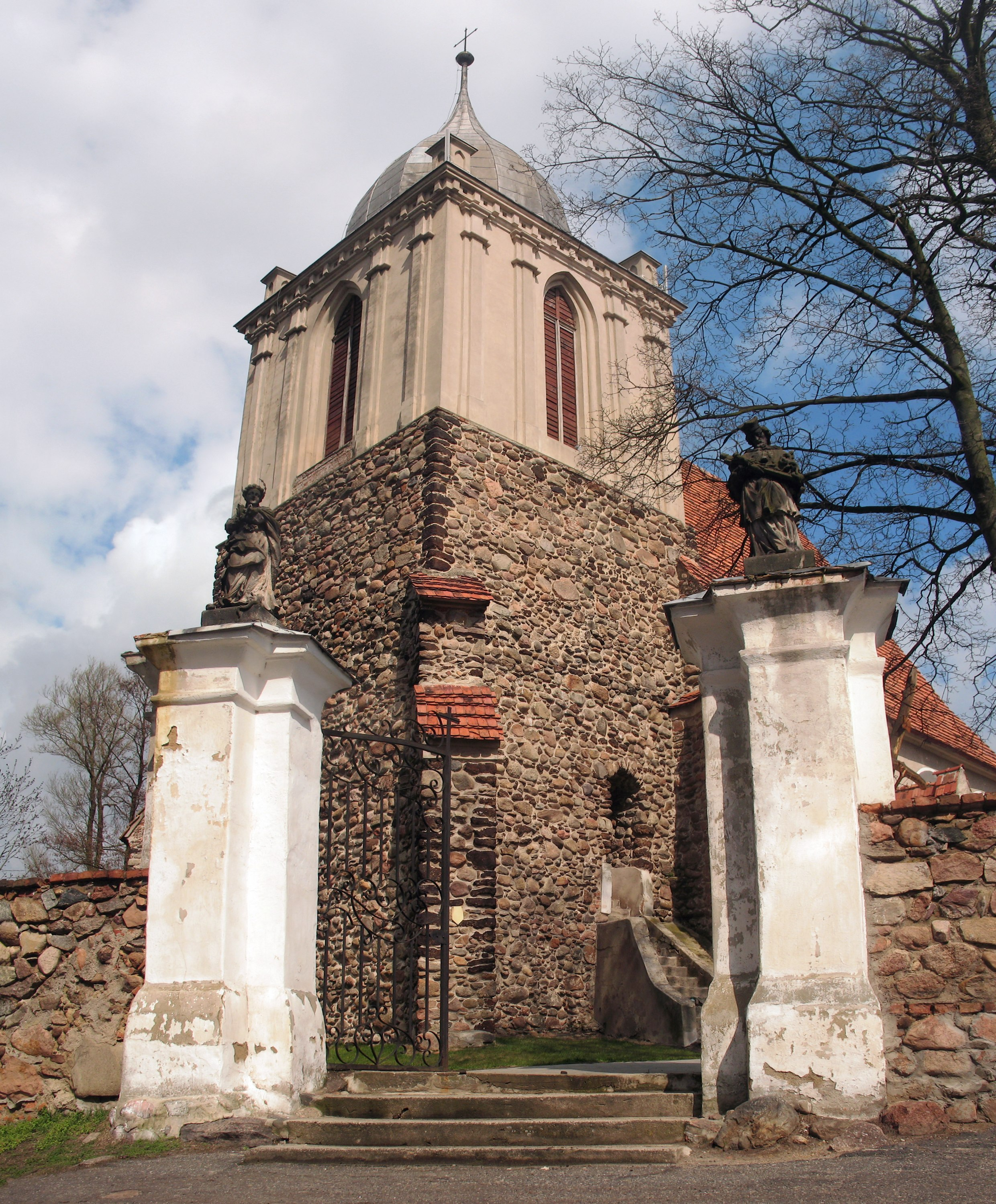
- The Catholic church in Świdnica

- Location within Poland
- Coordinates: 51°53′49″N 15°24′15″E
- Country: Poland
- Voivodeship: Lubusz
- County: Zielona Góra
- Gmina: Świdnica
- Population: 1,400

Świdnica (Polish: [ɕfidˈɲit͡sa]) is a village in Zielona Góra County, Lubusz Voivodeship, in western Poland. It is the seat of the gmina (administrative district) called Gmina Świdnica.

== Notable people ==
- Joseph Ignatius Ritter (1787–1857), German historian
