= Lipno, Zielona Góra County =

Lipno
- Village
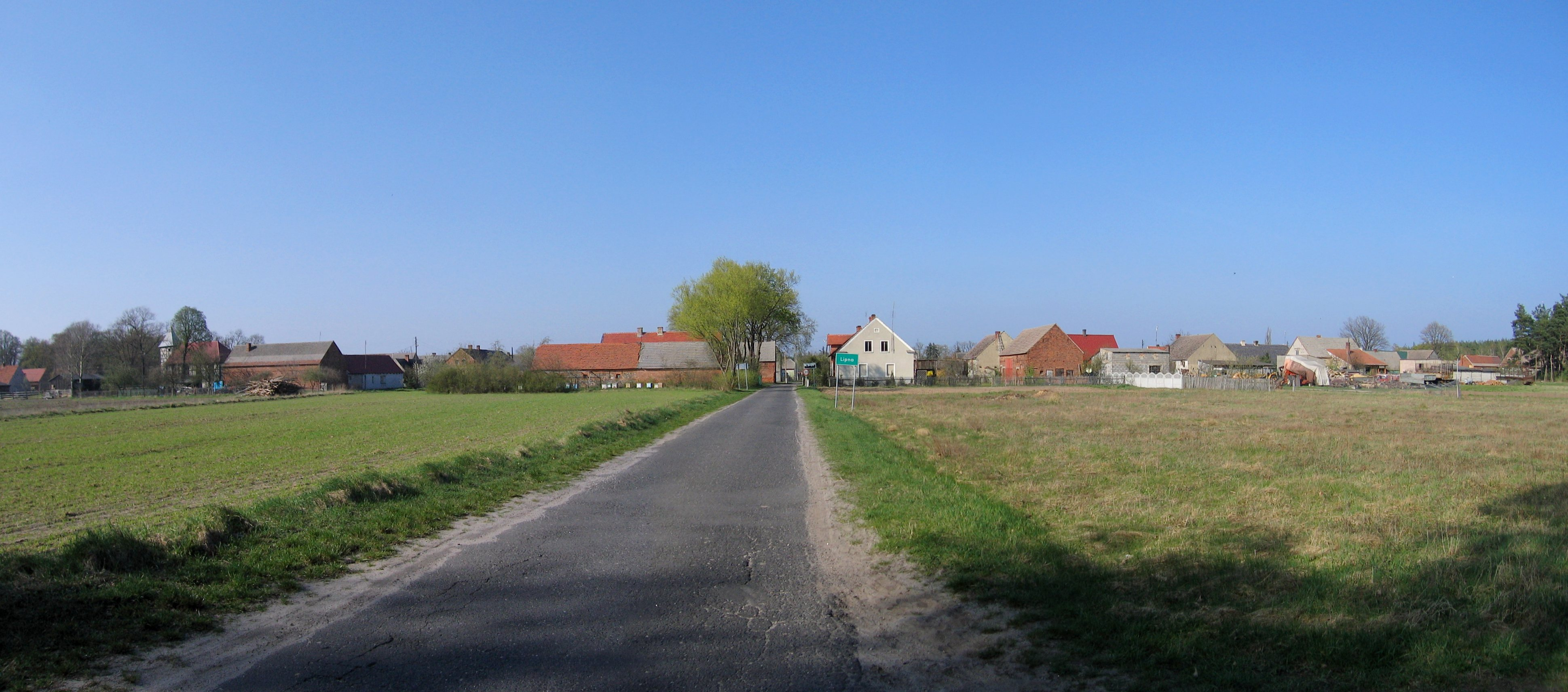

- Location within Poland
- Coordinates: 51°54′47″N 15°16′27″E
- Country: Poland
- Voivodeship: Lubusz
- County: Zielona Góra
- Gmina: Świdnica
- Population: 180

Lipno (Polish pronunciation: [ˈlipnɔ]) is a village in the administrative district of Gmina Świdnica, within Zielona Góra County, Lubusz Voivodeship, in western Poland.
