= Lipno (lake) =

Lake in Poland

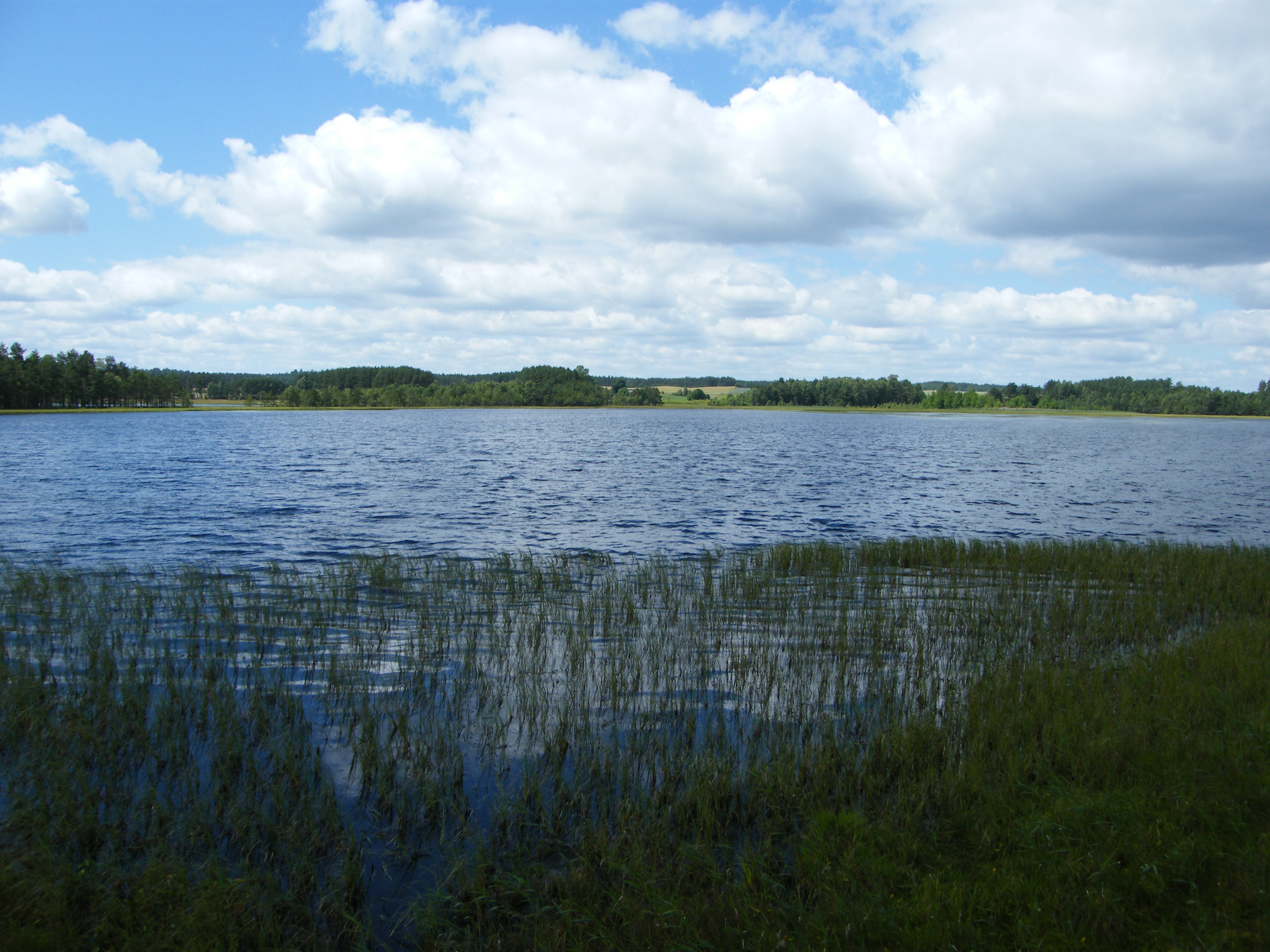

- Location within Pomeranian Voivodeship
- Location: Gmina Dziemiany, Pomeranian Voivodeship
- Coordinates: 54°00′28″N 17°49′44″E
- Basin countries: Poland
- Surface area: 41 ha (100 acres)
- Max. depth: 6 m (20 ft)

Lipno is a lake in the Tuchola Forest, in Gmina Dziemiany, Pomeranian Voivodeship of Northern Poland.
