= Biskupin, Lipno County =

Biskupin
- Village
- Location within Poland
- Coordinates: 52°50′8″N 19°8′55″E
- Country: Poland
- Voivodeship: Kuyavian-Pomeranian
- County: Lipno
- Gmina: Gmina Lipno

Biskupin (Polish pronunciation: [bisˈkupin]) is a village in the administrative district of Gmina Lipno, within Lipno County, Kuyavian-Pomeranian Voivodeship, in north-central Poland.
