= Lipno (Louny District) =

- Municipality
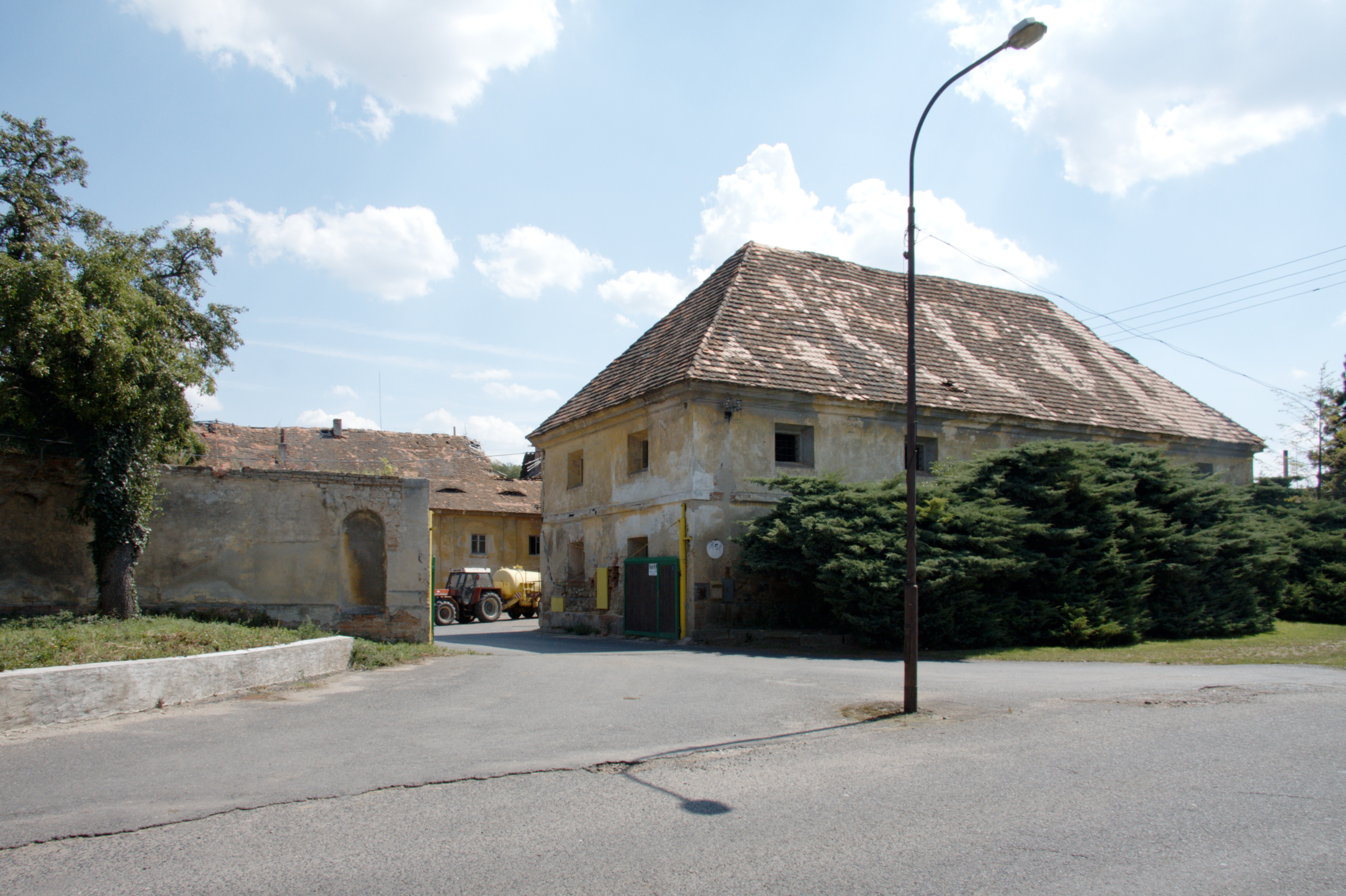
- Former manor house

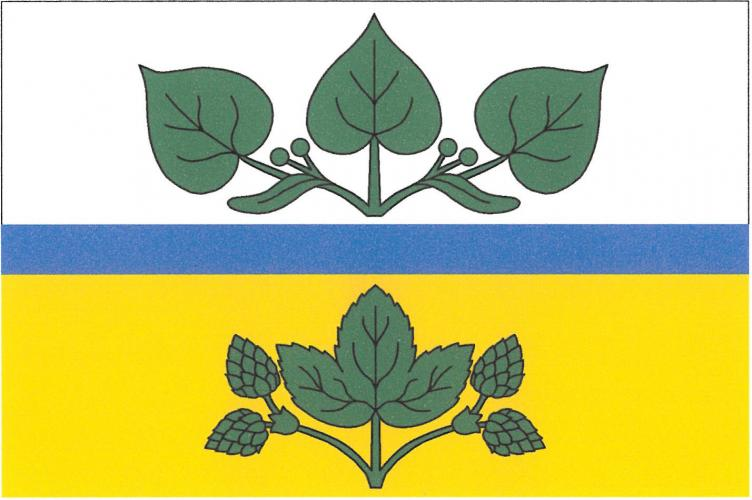
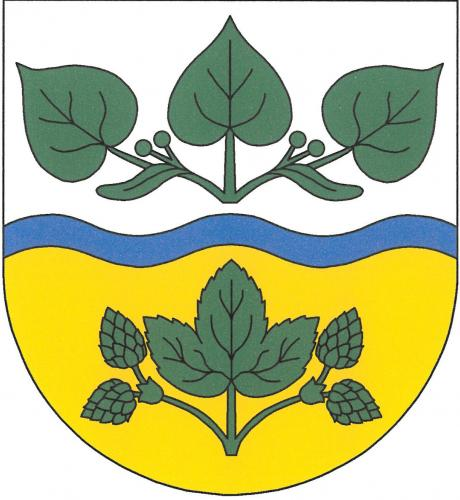
- Flag Coat of arms

- Location in the Czech Republic
- Coordinates: 50°18′2″N 13°40′51″E
- Country: Czech Republic
- Region: Ústí nad Labem
- District: Louny
- First mentioned: 1266

Area
  - Total: 18.72 km^{2} (7.23 sq mi)
- Elevation: 274 m (899 ft)

Population (2026-01-01)
  - Total: 581
  - Density: 31.0/km^{2} (80.4/sq mi)
- Time zone: UTC+1 (CET)
  - Summer (DST): UTC+2 (CEST)
- Postal codes: 438 01, 440 01
- Website: www.ou-lipno-louny.cz

Lipno is a municipality and village in Louny District in the Ústí nad Labem Region of the Czech Republic. It has about 600 inhabitants.

Lipno lies approximately 11 kilometres (7 mi) south-west of Louny, 48 km (30 mi) south-west of Ústí nad Labem, and 58 km (36 mi) north-west of Prague.

== Administrative division ==
Lipno consists of three municipal parts (in brackets population according to the 2021 census):

- Lipno (306)
- Drahomyšl (69)
- Lipenec (205)

== Demographics ==
Historical population
Year	Pop.	±%
1869	1,369	—
1880	1,436	+4.9%
1890	1,508	+5.0%
1900	1,597	+5.9%
1910	1,570	−1.7%
1921	1,558	−0.8%
1930	1,585	+1.7%
1950	992	−37.4%
1961	884	−10.9%
1970	762	−13.8%
1980	604	−20.7%
1991	521	−13.7%
2001	494	−5.2%
2011	466	−5.7%
2021	580	+24.5%
Source: Censuses
