= Drzonów =

- Village
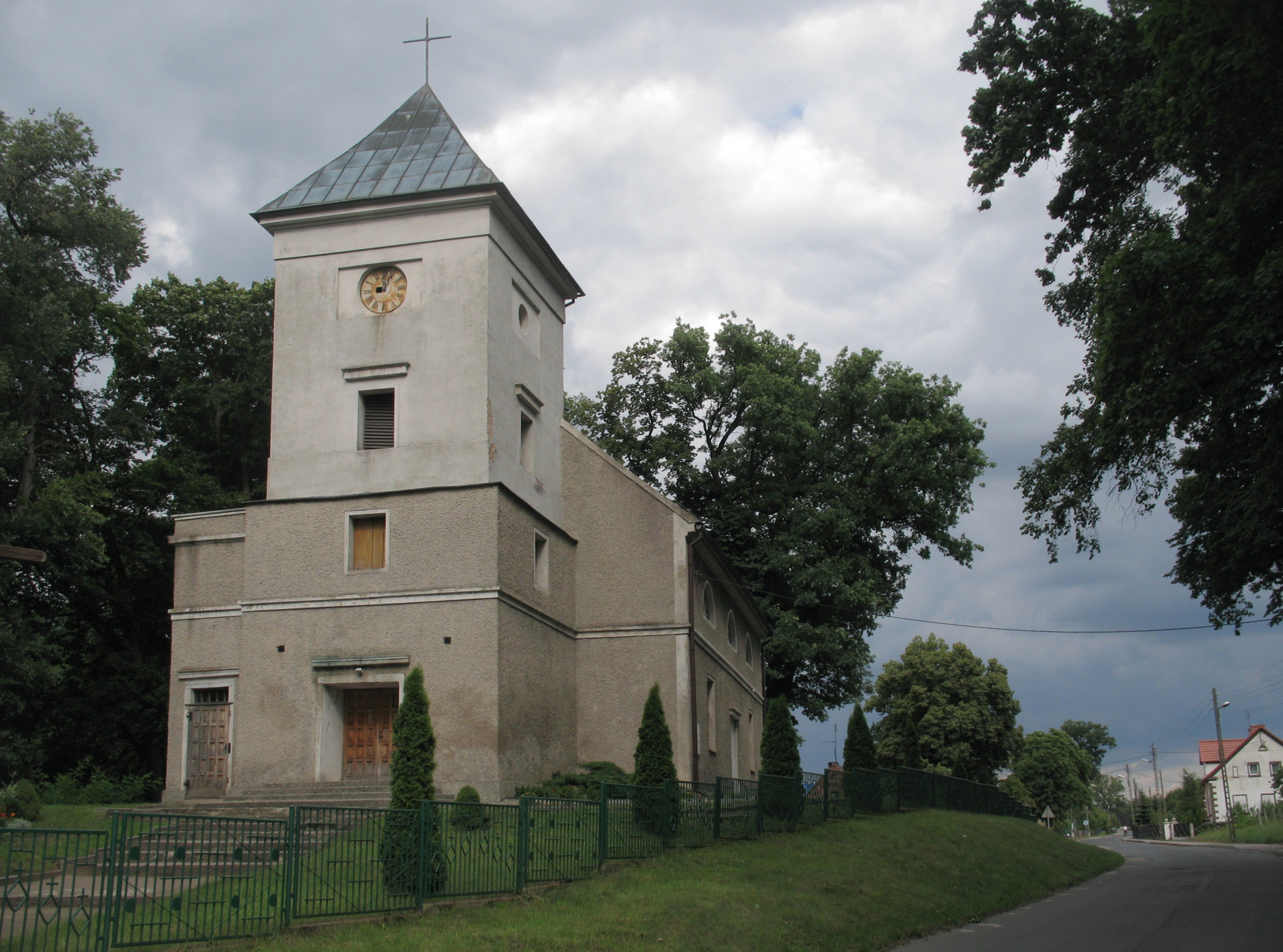
- The church in Drzonów

- Location within Poland
- Coordinates: 51°56′41″N 15°19′5″E
- Country: Poland
- Voivodeship: Lubusz
- County: Zielona Góra
- Gmina: Świdnica
- Time zone: UTC+1 (CET)
  - Summer (DST): UTC+2 (CEST)
- Vehicle registration: FZI

Drzonów ([ˈdʐɔnuf]) is a village in western Poland, in Gmina Świdnica, within Zielona Góra County, Lubusz Voivodeship.

The village is home to the Lubusz Military Museum, housing numerous historical tanks, self-propelled anti-tank guns and aeroplanes. Among the historical landmarks of the village are the 19th-century church and a palace.

After World War II, the village was repopulated with Poles, mostly people expelled by the Soviet Union from the annexed village of Rychcice near Lwów (modern Lviv, Ukraine).
