= Piątki, Kuyavian-Pomeranian Voivodeship =

Piątki
- Village
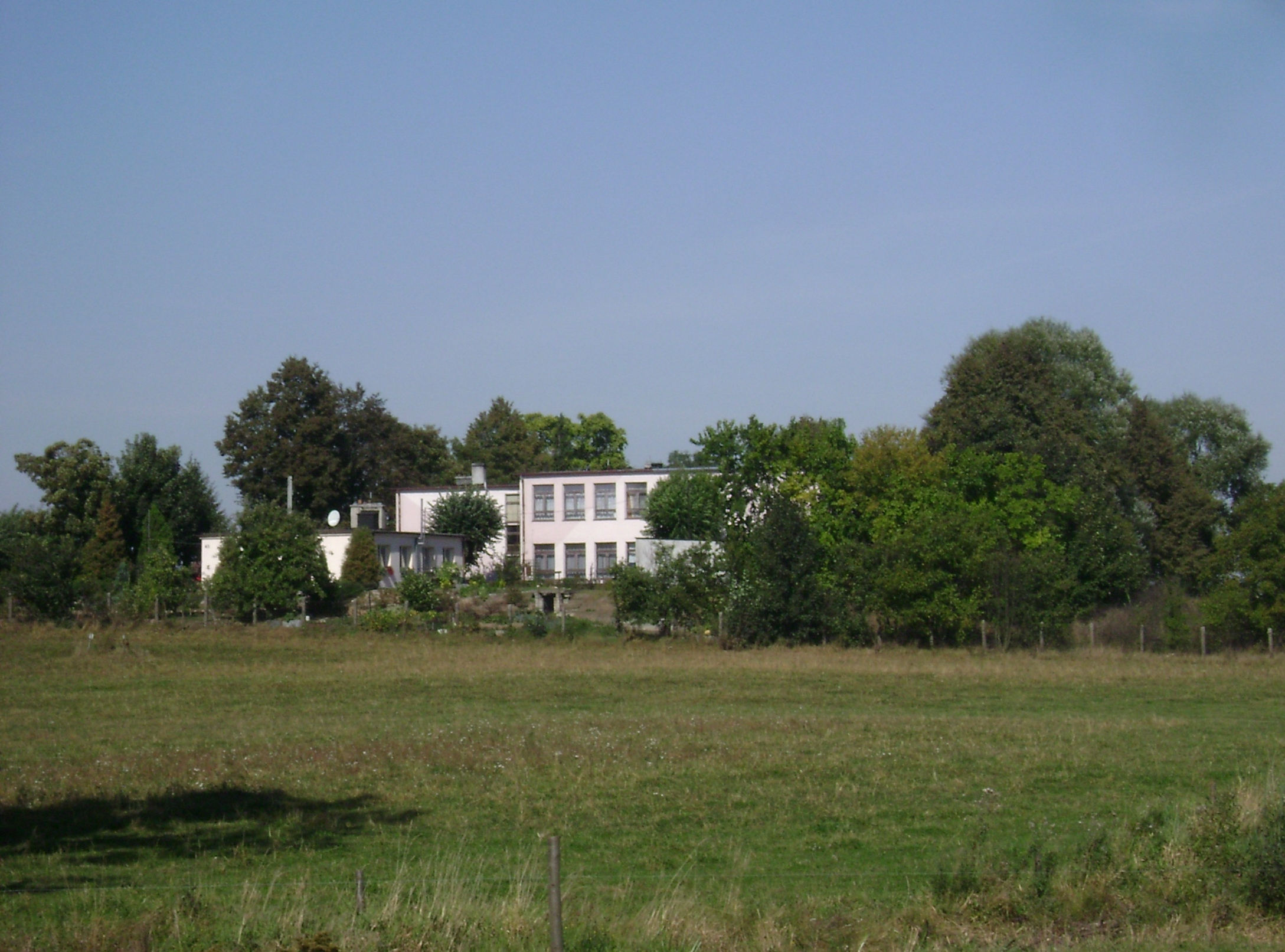

- Location within Poland
- Coordinates: 52°49′N 19°16′E
- Country: Poland
- Voivodeship: Kuyavian-Pomeranian
- County: Lipno
- Gmina: Gmina Lipno
- Time zone: UTC+1 (CET)
  - Summer (DST): UTC+2 (CEST)
- Postal code: 87-600
- Vehicle registration: CLI

Piątki [ˈpjɔntki] is a village in the administrative district of Gmina Lipno, within Lipno County, Kuyavian-Pomeranian Voivodeship, in north-central Poland.
