= Letnica, Lubusz Voivodeship =

Letnica
- Village
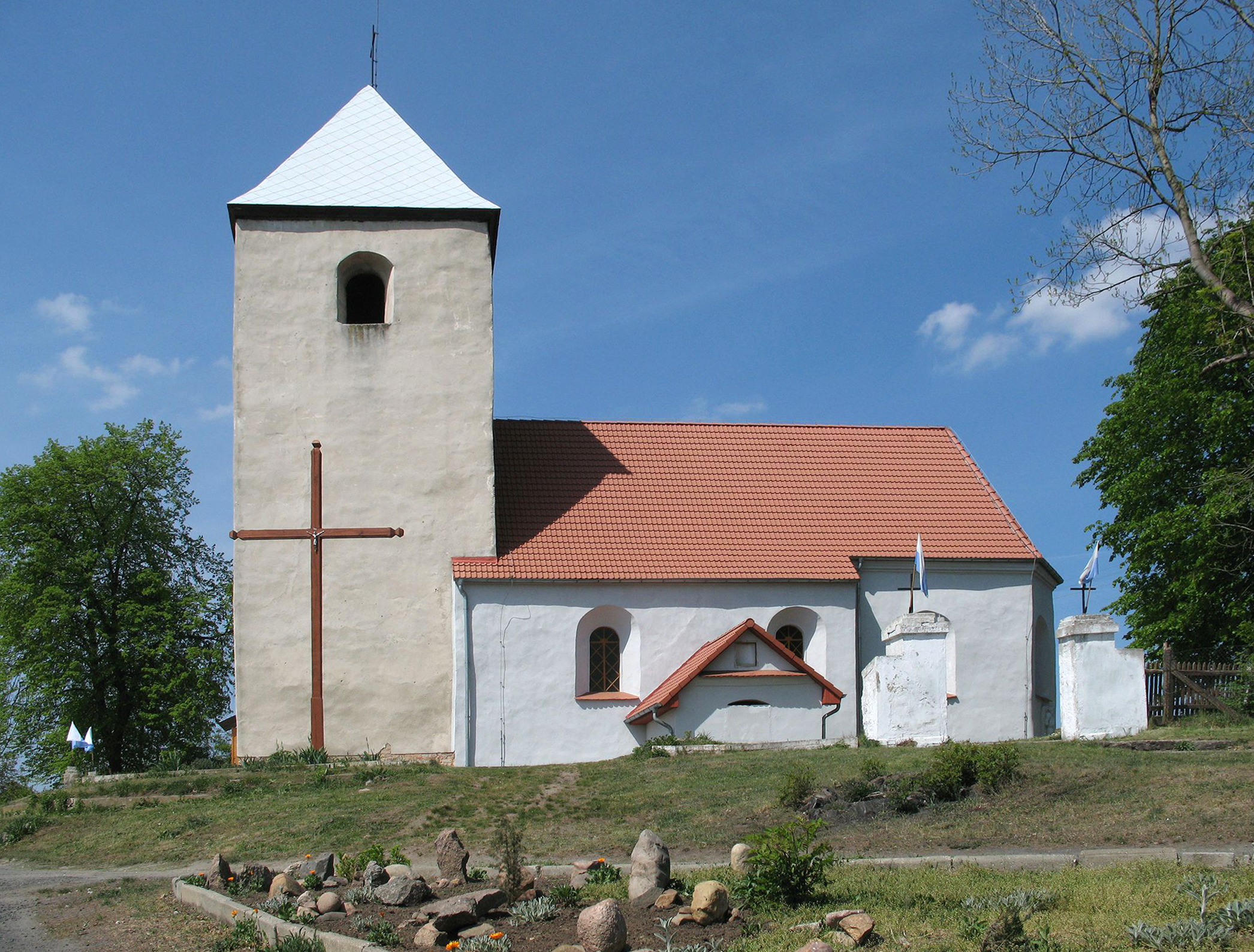
- The Catholic church in Letnica

- Location within Poland
- Coordinates: 51°54′N 15°20′E
- Country: Poland
- Voivodeship: Lubusz
- County: Zielona Góra
- Gmina: Świdnica
- Population (approx.): 630

Letnica [lɛtˈnit͡sa] is a village in the administrative district of Gmina Świdnica, within Zielona Góra County, Lubusz Voivodeship, in western Poland.
