= Mil Mi-3 =

Soviet light-utility helicopter

Mi-3

General information
- Type: Light utility helicopter
- Manufacturer: Mil Moscow Helicopter Plant

History
- Developed from: Mi-2

The Mil Mi-3 was a Soviet light-utility helicopter originally designed in the 1960s as a heavier and larger version of the Mil Mi-2 helicopter. It is also a Russian designation for the Polish-Soviet co-operation on larger helicopters based on the Mi-2 that could replace the Mi-4 from 1971. The project never passed the stage of design. Due to problems in this cooperation, the Poles decided to build a completely new helicopter on their own, designated as PZL W-3 Sokół.

Another helicopter designated Mil Mi-3 was an improved Mil Mi-1 with four bladed main rotor.
