= Lipno, Gmina Lipno, Kuyavian-Pomeranian Voivodeship =

Lipno
- Village
- Location within Poland
- Coordinates: 52°51′33″N 19°10′32″E
- Country: Poland
- Voivodeship: Kuyavian-Pomeranian
- County: Lipno
- Gmina: Gmina Lipno
- Population: 290

Lipno (Polish pronunciation: [ˈlipnɔ]) is a village in Lipno County, Kuyavian-Pomeranian Voivodeship, in north-central Poland.
