= Wirówek, Gmina Świdnica =

Wirówek
- Settlement
- Location within Poland
- Coordinates: 51°57′5″N 15°17′25″E
- Country: Poland
- Voivodeship: Lubusz
- County: Zielona Góra
- Gmina: Świdnica

Wirówek [viˈruvɛk] is a settlement in the administrative district of Gmina Świdnica, within Zielona Góra County, Lubusz Voivodeship, in western Poland.
