= Gmina Świdnica, Lubusz Voivodeship =

Gmina Świdnica Świdnica Commune
- Gmina
- Coat of arms

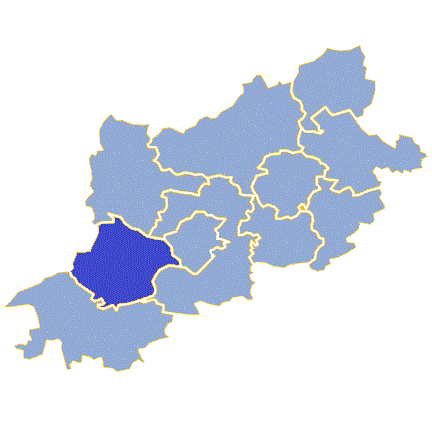
- Gmina Świdnica in Zielona Góra County

- Location within Poland
- Coordinates (Świdnica): 51°53′49″N 15°24′15″E
- Country: Poland
- Voivodeship: Lubusz
- County: Zielona Góra
- Seat: Świdnica

Area
  - Total: 160.8 km^{2} (62.1 sq mi)

Population (2019-06-30)
  - Total: 6,552
  - Density: 40.75/km^{2} (105.5/sq mi)
- Website: www.swidnica.zgora.pl

Gmina Świdnica is a rural gmina (administrative district) in Zielona Góra County, Lubusz Voivodeship, in western Poland. Its seat is the village of Świdnica, which lies approximately 9 kilometres (6 mi) south-west of Zielona Góra.

The gmina covers an area of 160.8 square kilometres (62.1 sq mi), and as of 2019 its total population is 6,552.

== Villages ==
Gmina Świdnica contains the villages and settlements of Buchałów, Dobra, Drzonów, Grabowiec, Koźla, Letnica, Lipno, Łochowo, Orzewo, Piaski, Radomia, Rybno, Słone, Świdnica, Wilkanowo and Wirówek.

== Neighbouring gminas ==
Gmina Świdnica is bordered by the city of Zielona Góra and by the gminas of Czerwieńsk, Dąbie, Nowogród Bobrzański and Zielona Góra.

== Twin towns – sister cities ==
Gmina Świdnica is twinned with:

- Heinersbrück, Germany
- Lübbenau, Germany
