= Białe Błota-Dębowiec =

- Village
- Location within Poland
- Coordinates: 52°49′43″N 18°59′32″E
- Country: Poland
- Voivodeship: Kuyavian-Pomeranian
- County: Lipno
- Gmina: Bobrowniki

Białe Błota-Dębowiec [ˈbjawɛ ˈbwɔta dɛmˈbɔvjɛt͡s] is a village in the administrative district of Gmina Bobrowniki, within Lipno County, Kuyavian-Pomeranian Voivodeship, in northcentral Poland.
