= Zakrzewo, Lipno County =

Zakrzewo
- Village
- Location within Poland
- Coordinates: 52°42′53″N 19°19′3″E
- Country: Poland
- Voivodeship: Kuyavian-Pomeranian
- County: Lipno
- Gmina: Wielgie
- Population: 200

Zakrzewo [zaˈkʂɛvɔ] is a village in the administrative district of Gmina Wielgie, within Lipno County, Kuyavian-Pomeranian Voivodeship, in north-central Poland.
