= Trzcianka, Kuyavian-Pomeranian Voivodeship =

Trzcianka
- Village
- Location within Poland
- Coordinates: 52°43′N 19°26′E
- Country: Poland
- Voivodeship: Kuyavian-Pomeranian
- County: Lipno
- Gmina: Tłuchowo

Trzcianka [ˈtʂt͡ɕaŋka] is a village in the administrative district of Gmina Tłuchowo, within Lipno County, Kuyavian-Pomeranian Voivodeship, in north-central Poland.
