= Rumunki, Kuyavian-Pomeranian Voivodeship =

Rumunki
- Village
- Location within Poland
- Coordinates: 52°51′35″N 19°20′44″E
- Country: Poland
- Voivodeship: Kuyavian-Pomeranian
- County: Lipno
- Gmina: Skępe

Rumunki [ruˈmuŋki] is a village in the administrative district of Gmina Skępe, within Lipno County, Kuyavian-Pomeranian Voivodeship, in north-central Poland.
