= Gnojno, Lipno County =

Gnojno
- Village
- Location within Poland
- Coordinates: 52°47′N 19°4′E
- Country: Poland
- Voivodeship: Kuyavian-Pomeranian
- County: Lipno
- Gmina: Bobrowniki

Gnojno [ˈɡnɔi̯nɔ] is a village in the administrative district of Gmina Bobrowniki, within Lipno County, Kuyavian-Pomeranian Voivodeship, in north-central Poland.
