= Witkowo (disambiguation) =

Witkowo is a town in Greater Poland Voivodeship (west-central Poland).

Witkowo may also refer to:

- Witkowo, Lipno County in Kuyavian-Pomeranian Voivodeship (north-central Poland)
- Witkowo, Toruń County in Kuyavian-Pomeranian Voivodeship (north-central Poland)
- Witkowo, Mogilno County in Kuyavian-Pomeranian Voivodeship (north-central Poland)
- Witkowo, Sępólno County in Kuyavian-Pomeranian Voivodeship (north-central Poland)
- Witkowo, Podlaskie Voivodeship (north-east Poland)
- Witkowo, Masovian Voivodeship (east-central Poland)
- Witkowo, Pomeranian Voivodeship (north Poland)
