= Rachcin =

- Village
- Location within Poland
- Coordinates: 52°44′N 19°2′E
- Country: Poland
- Voivodeship: Kuyavian-Pomeranian
- County: Lipno
- Gmina: Bobrowniki
- Population: 386

Rachcin [ˈraxt͡ɕin] is a village in the administrative district of Gmina Bobrowniki, within Lipno County, Kuyavian-Pomeranian Voivodeship, in north-central Poland.
