= Stare Rybitwy =

- Village
- Location within Poland
- Coordinates: 52°49′09″N 18°55′20″E
- Country: Poland
- Voivodeship: Kuyavian-Pomeranian
- County: Lipno
- Gmina: Bobrowniki

Stare Rybitwy [ˈstarɛ rɨˈbitfɨ] is a village in the administrative district of Gmina Bobrowniki, within Lipno County, Kuyavian-Pomeranian Voivodeship, in north-central Poland.
