= Czerskie Rumunki =

- Village
- Location within Poland
- Coordinates: 52°46′00″N 19°13′00″E
- Country: Poland
- Voivodeship: Kuyavian-Pomeranian
- County: Lipno
- Gmina: Wielgie

Czerskie Rumunki [ˈt͡ʂɛrskʲɛ ruˈmunki] is a village in the administrative district of Gmina Wielgie, within Lipno County, Kuyavian-Pomeranian Voivodeship, in north-central Poland.
