= Lubówiec =

- Village
- Location within Poland
- Coordinates: 52°54′00″N 19°16′00″E
- Country: Poland
- Voivodeship: Kuyavian-Pomeranian
- County: Lipno
- Gmina: Skępe

Lubówiec [luˈbuvjɛt͡s] is a village in the administrative district of Gmina Skępe, within Lipno County, Kuyavian-Pomeranian Voivodeship, in north-central Poland.
