= Źródła =

Źródła may refer to the following places in Poland:

- Źródła, Lower Silesian Voivodeship (south-west Poland)
- Źródła, Kuyavian-Pomeranian Voivodeship (north-central Poland)
- Źródła, Lesser Poland Voivodeship (south Poland)
