= Głęboczek, Gmina Skępe =

Głęboczek
- Village
- Location within Poland
- Coordinates: 52°50′57″N 19°19′16″E
- Country: Poland
- Voivodeship: Kuyavian-Pomeranian
- County: Lipno
- Gmina: Skępe

Głęboczek [ɡwɛmˈbɔt͡ʂɛk] is a village in the administrative district of Gmina Skępe, within Lipno County, Kuyavian-Pomeranian Voivodeship, in north-central Poland.
