= Wielgie, Lipno County =

Wielgie
- Village
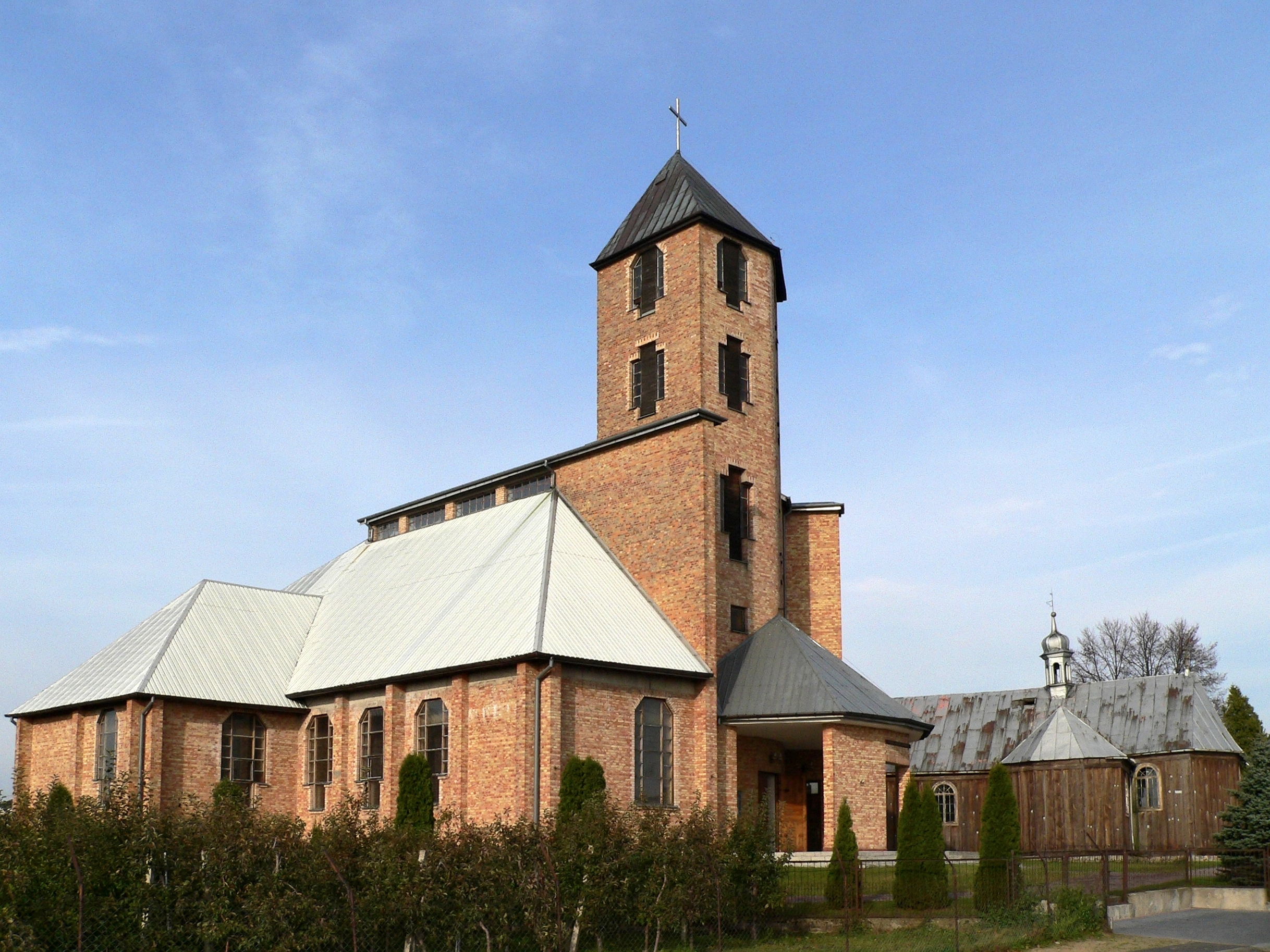
- Saint Lawrence church in Wielgie

- Location within Poland
- Coordinates: 52°45′N 19°16′E
- Country: Poland
- Voivodeship: Kuyavian-Pomeranian
- County: Lipno
- Gmina: Wielgie
- Time zone: UTC+1 (CET)
  - Summer (DST): UTC+2 (CEST)
- Vehicle registration: CLI
- Website: https://www.wielgie.pl/

Wielgie [ˈvjɛlɡʲɛ] is a village in Lipno County, Kuyavian-Pomeranian Voivodeship, in central Poland. It is the seat of the gmina (administrative district) called Gmina Wielgie.

== History ==
During the German occupation of Poland (World War II), Poles from Wielgie were among the victims of large massacres of Poles from the county carried out by the Germans in nearby Karnkowo as part of the Intelligenzaktion.
