= Kukowo =

Kukowo may refer to the following places:

- Kukowo, Kuyavian-Pomeranian Voivodeship (north-central Poland)
- Kukowo, Podlaskie Voivodeship (north-east Poland)
- Kukowo, Pomeranian Voivodeship (north Poland)
- Kukowo, Warmian-Masurian Voivodeship (north Poland)
