= Chałacie =

- Village
- Location within Poland
- Coordinates: 52°52′32″N 19°25′13″E
- Country: Poland
- Voivodeship: Kuyavian-Pomeranian
- County: Lipno
- Gmina: Skępe

Chałacie [xaˈwat͡ɕɛ] is a village in the administrative district of Gmina Skępe, within Lipno County, Kuyavian-Pomeranian Voivodeship, in north-central Poland.

During the years 1975–1998, the settlement administratively belonged to the Włocławek Voivodeship.
