= Nowa Wieś, Gmina Wielgie =

Nowa Wieś
- Village
- Location within Poland
- Coordinates: 52°44′46″N 19°13′57″E
- Country: Poland
- Voivodeship: Kuyavian-Pomeranian
- County: Lipno
- Gmina: Wielgie

Nowa Wieś [ˈnɔva ˈvjɛɕ] is a village in the administrative district of Gmina Wielgie, within Lipno County, Kuyavian-Pomeranian Voivodeship, in north-central Poland.
