= Zajeziorze, Gmina Skępe =

Zajeziorze
- Village
- Location within Poland
- Coordinates: 52°51′15″N 19°22′7″E
- Country: Poland
- Voivodeship: Kuyavian-Pomeranian
- County: Lipno
- Gmina: Skępe
- Time zone: UTC+1 (CET)
  - Summer (DST): UTC+2 (CEST)
- Vehicle registration: CLI

Zajeziorze [zajɛˈʑɔʐɛ] is a village in the administrative district of Gmina Skępe, within Lipno County, Kuyavian-Pomeranian Voivodeship, in central Poland.
