= Popowo, Gmina Tłuchowo =

Popowo
- Village
- Interactive map of Popowo
- Location within Poland
- Coordinates: 52°42′4.18″N 19°24′50.3″E
- Country: Poland
- Voivodeship: Kuyavian-Pomeranian
- County: Lipno
- Gmina: Tłuchowo

Popowo ([pɔˈpɔvɔ]) is a village in the administrative district of Gmina Tłuchowo, within Lipno County, Kuyavian-Pomeranian Voivodeship, in north-central Poland. It lies in the historic region of Dobrzyń Land. The village was first recorded in 1321 in a deed settling the boundary between the dioceses of Płock and Włocławek. From 1975 to 1998 Popowo (via Gmina Tłuchowo) formed part of Włocławek Voivodeship, before the nationwide administrative reform of 1999.

Lech Wałęsa, former president of Poland, was born here.
