= Złowody =

- Village
- Location within Poland
- Coordinates: 52°43′38″N 19°12′18″E
- Country: Poland
- Voivodeship: Kuyavian-Pomeranian
- County: Lipno
- Gmina: Wielgie

Złowody [zwɔˈvɔdɨ] is a village in the administrative district of Gmina Wielgie, within Lipno County, Kuyavian-Pomeranian Voivodeship, in north-central Poland.
