= Białe Błota, Lipno County =

Białe Błota
- Village
- Location within Poland
- Coordinates: 52°50′N 18°58′E
- Country: Poland
- Voivodeship: Kuyavian-Pomeranian
- County: Lipno
- Gmina: Bobrowniki

Białe Błota [ˈbjawɛ ˈbwɔta] is a village in the administrative district of Gmina Bobrowniki, within Lipno County, Kuyavian-Pomeranian Voivodeship, in north-central Poland.
