= Rachcin-Okrągła =

- Village
- Location within Poland
- Coordinates: 52°44′39″N 19°02′05″E
- Country: Poland
- Voivodeship: Kuyavian-Pomeranian
- County: Lipno
- Gmina: Bobrowniki

Rachcin-Okrągła [ˈraxt͡ɕin ɔˈkrɔŋɡwa] is a village in the administrative district of Gmina Bobrowniki, within Lipno County, Kuyavian-Pomeranian Voivodeship, in north-central Poland.
