= Gmina Bobrowniki, Kuyavian-Pomeranian Voivodeship =

Gmina Bobrowniki Bobrowniki Commune
- Gmina
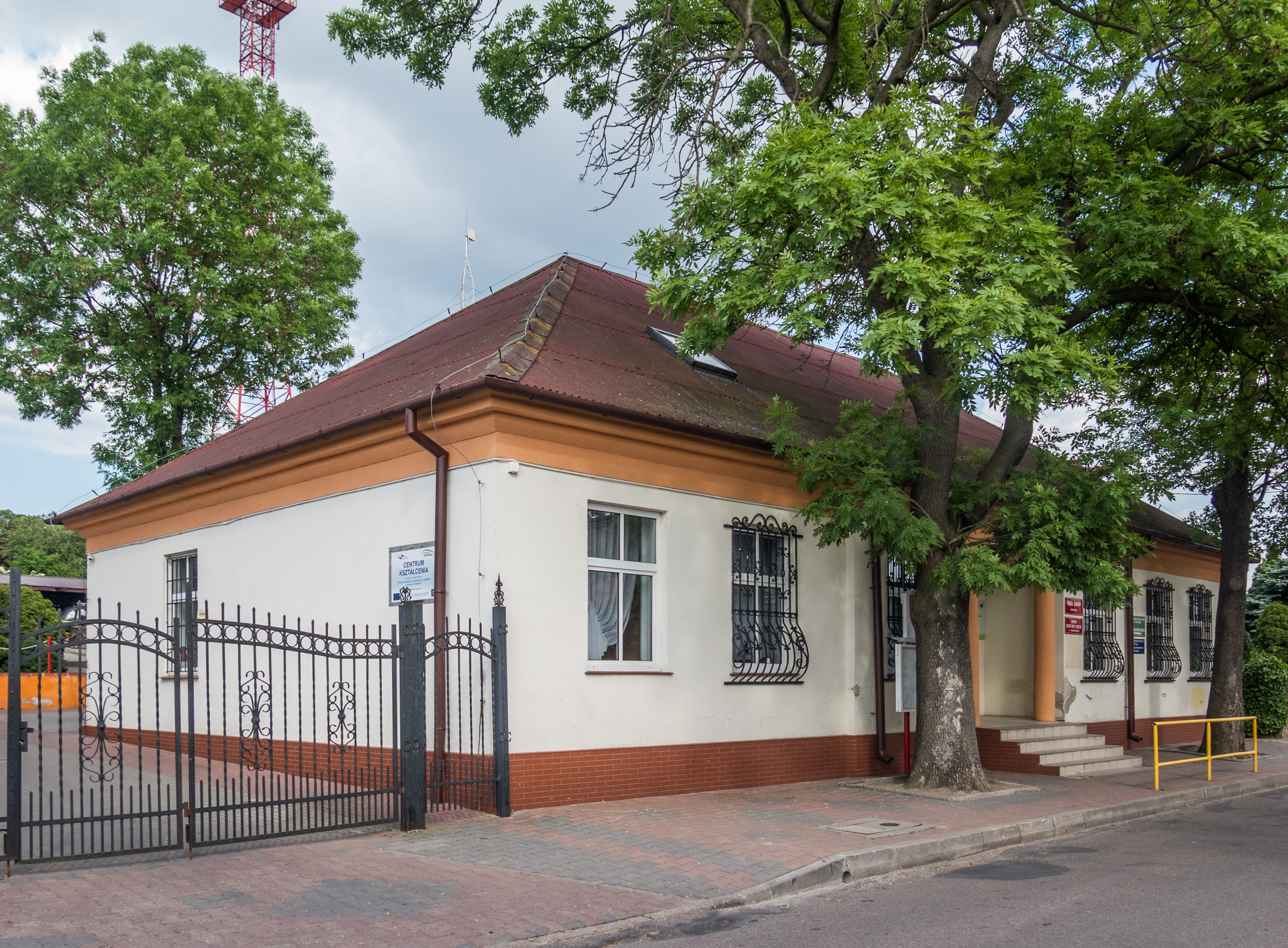
- Seat of the gmina office

- Coat of arms
- Interactive map of Gmina Bobrowniki
- Coordinates (Bobrowniki): 52°46′36″N 18°57′26″E
- Country: Poland
- Voivodeship: Kuyavian-Pomeranian
- County: Lipno
- Seat: Bobrowniki

Area
  - Total: 95.55 km^{2} (36.89 sq mi)

Population (2006)
  - Total: 3,044
  - Density: 31.86/km^{2} (82.51/sq mi)
- Website: http://ugbobrowniki.pl/

Gmina Bobrowniki is a rural gmina (administrative district) in Lipno County, Kuyavian-Pomeranian Voivodeship, in north-central Poland. Its seat is the town of Bobrowniki, which lies approximately 17 kilometres (11 mi) south-west of Lipno and 37 km (23 mi) south-east of Toruń.

The gmina covers an area of 95.55 square kilometres (36.9 sq mi), and as of 2006 its total population is 3,044.

== Villages ==
Gmina Bobrowniki contains the villages and settlements of Białe Błota, Białe Błota-Dębowiec, Bobrownickie Pole, Bógpomóż Nowy, Brzustowa, Gnojno, Oparczyska, Polichnowo, Polichnowo-Piaski, Rachcin, Rachcin-Okrągła, Rachcin-Parcele Łochockie, Rachcinek, Stara Rzeczna, Stare Rybitwy, Stare Rybitwy-Miszek, Stary Bógpomóż and Winduga.

== Neighbouring gminas ==
Gmina Bobrowniki is bordered by the towns of Nieszawa and Włocławek, and by the gminas of Czernikowo, Fabianki, Lipno, Lubanie and Waganiec.
