= Suminek, Kuyavian-Pomeranian Voivodeship =

Suminek
- Village
- Location within Poland
- Coordinates: 52°47′N 19°25′E
- Country: Poland
- Voivodeship: Kuyavian-Pomeranian
- County: Lipno
- Gmina: Tłuchowo

Suminek [suˈminɛk] is a village in the administrative district of Gmina Tłuchowo, within Lipno County, Kuyavian-Pomeranian Voivodeship, in north-central Poland.
