= Czarny Las, Kuyavian-Pomeranian Voivodeship =

Czarny Las
- Village
- Location within Poland
- Coordinates: 51°32′58″N 16°56′52″E
- Country: Poland
- Voivodeship: Kuyavian-Pomeranian
- County: Lipno
- Gmina: Skępe

Czarny Las [ˈt͡ʂarnɨ ˈlas] is a village in the administrative district of Gmina Skępe, within Lipno County, Kuyavian-Pomeranian Voivodeship, in north-central Poland.
