= Bógzapłać =

- Village
- Location within Poland
- Coordinates: 52°56′44″N 19°20′9″E
- Country: Poland
- Voivodeship: Kuyavian-Pomeranian
- County: Lipno
- Gmina: Skępe
- Time zone: UTC+1 (CET)
  - Summer (DST): UTC+2 (CEST)
- Postal code: 87-630
- Vehicle registration: CLI

Bógzapłać [buɡˈzapwat͡ɕ] is a village in the administrative district of Gmina Skępe, within Lipno County, Kuyavian-Pomeranian Voivodeship, in north-central Poland.

Until 2023, Bógzapłać was a part of village Sarnowo.

In the late 19th century, the settlement had a population of 34.
