= Gmina Wielgie =

Gmina Wielgie Wielgie Commune
- Gmina
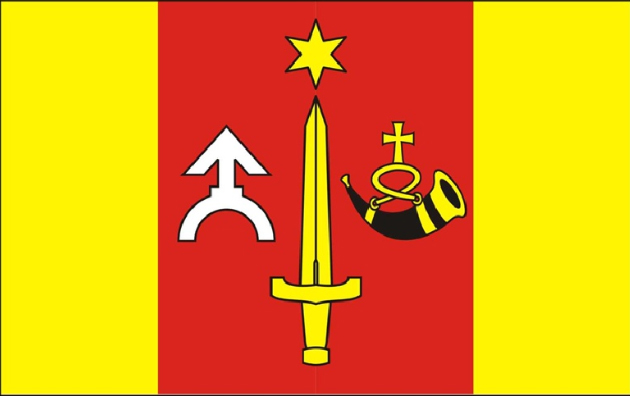
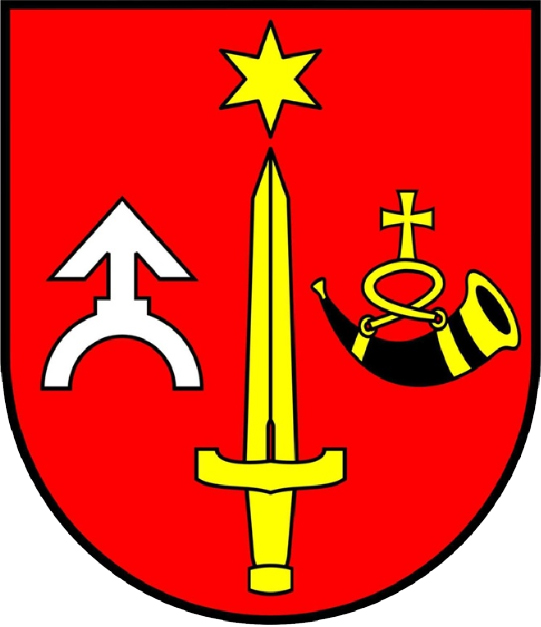
- Flag Coat of arms
- Interactive map of Gmina Wielgie
- Coordinates (Wielgie): 52°45′N 19°16′E
- Country: Poland
- Voivodeship: Kuyavian-Pomeranian
- County: Lipno
- Seat: Wielgie

Area
  - Total: 133.83 km^{2} (51.67 sq mi)

Population (2009)
  - Total: 6,901
  - Density: 51.57/km^{2} (133.6/sq mi)
- Website: http://www.wielgie.pl/

Gmina Wielgie is a rural gmina (administrative district) in Lipno County, Kuyavian-Pomeranian Voivodeship, in north-central Poland. Its seat is the village of Wielgie, which lies approximately 13 kilometres (8 mi) south-east of Lipno and 54 km (34 mi) south-east of Toruń.

The gmina covers an area of 133.83 square kilometres (51.7 sq mi), and as of 2009 its total population is 6,901.

== Villages ==
Gmina Wielgie contains the villages and settlements of Bętlewo, Czarne, Czerskie Rumunki, Nowa Wieś, Oleszno, Piaseczno, Płonczyn, Rumunki Tupadelskie, Suradówek, Suszewo, Teodorowo, Tupadły, Wielgie, Witkowo, Zaduszniki, Zakrzewo and Złowody.

== Neighbouring gminas ==
Gmina Wielgie is bordered by the gminas of Dobrzyń nad Wisłą, Fabianki, Lipno, Skępe and Tłuchowo.
