= Kierz, Kuyavian-Pomeranian Voivodeship =

Kierz
- Village
- Location within Poland
- Coordinates: 52°52′52″N 19°19′7″E
- Country: Poland
- Voivodeship: Kuyavian-Pomeranian
- County: Lipno
- Gmina: Skępe

Kierz [kʲɛʂ] is a village in the administrative district of Gmina Skępe, within Lipno County, Kuyavian-Pomeranian Voivodeship, in north-central Poland.
