= Gmina Skępe =

Gmina Skępe Skępe Commune
- Gmina
- Coat of arms
- Interactive map of Gmina Skępe
- Coordinates (Skępe): 52°51′58″N 19°20′49″E
- Country: Poland
- Voivodeship: Kuyavian-Pomeranian
- County: Lipno
- Seat: Skępe

Area
  - Total: 179.23 km^{2} (69.20 sq mi)

Population (2006)
  - Total: 7,503
  - Density: 41.86/km^{2} (108.4/sq mi)
  - Urban: 3,442
  - Rural: 4,061
- Website: http://www.skepe.pl

Gmina Skępe is an urban-rural gmina (administrative district) in Lipno County, Kuyavian-Pomeranian Voivodeship, in north-central Poland. Its seat is the town of Skępe, which lies approximately 13 kilometres (8 mi) east of Lipno and 53 km (33 mi) east of Toruń.

The gmina covers an area of 179.23 square kilometres (69.2 sq mi), and as of 2006 its total population is 7,503 (out of which the population of Skępe amounts to 3,442, and the population of the rural part of the gmina is 4,061).

== Villages ==
Apart from the town of Skępe, Gmina Skępe contains the villages and settlements of Babie Ławy, Boguchwała, Bógzapłać, Chałacie, Czarny Las, Czermno, Franciszkowo, Gęstowarka, Głęboczek, Gorzeszyn, Grabówiec, Guzowatka, Huta, Jarczewo, Józefkowo, Kamienica, Kierz, Koziołek, Kujawy, Kukowo, Łąkie, Ławiczek, Likiec, Lubówiec, Moczadła, Modrzewie, Narutowo, Pokrzywnik, Radziochy, Rumunki, Sarnowo, Skępskie, Szczekarzewo, Wioska, Wólka, Żagno, Zajeziorze and Żuchowo.

== Neighbouring gminas ==
Gmina Skępe is bordered by the gminas of Chrostkowo, Lipno, Mochowo, Rogowo, Sierpc, Szczutowo, Tłuchowo and Wielgie.
