= Kamień Kotowy =

- Village
- Location within Poland
- Coordinates: 52°44′N 19°26′E
- Country: Poland
- Voivodeship: Kuyavian-Pomeranian
- County: Lipno
- Gmina: Tłuchowo

Kamień Kotowy (Polish pronunciation: [ˈkamjɛj̃ kɔˈtɔvɨ]) is a village in the administrative district of Gmina Tłuchowo, within Lipno County, Kuyavian-Pomeranian Voivodeship, in north-central Poland.
