= Pokrzywnik =

Pokrzywnik may refer to the following places in Poland:

- Pokrzywnik, Lwówek County in Lower Silesian Voivodeship (south-west Poland)
- Pokrzywnik, Zgorzelec County in Lower Silesian Voivodeship (south-west Poland)
- Pokrzywnik, Kuyavian-Pomeranian Voivodeship (north-central Poland)
- Pokrzywnik, Masovian Voivodeship (east-central Poland)
