= Oparczyska =

- Village
- Location within Poland
- Coordinates: 52°48′58″N 19°3′42″E
- Country: Poland
- Voivodeship: Kuyavian-Pomeranian
- County: Lipno
- Gmina: Bobrowniki
- Population: 80

Oparczyska [ɔparˈt͡ʂɨska] is a village in the administrative district of Gmina Bobrowniki, within Lipno County, Kuyavian-Pomeranian Voivodeship, in north-central Poland.
