= Łąkie =

Łąkie may refer to:

- Łąkie, Gmina Rakoniewice, Grodzisk County in Greater Poland Voivodeship (west-central Poland)
- Łąkie, Złotów County in Greater Poland Voivodeship (west-central Poland)
- Łąkie, Lipno County in Kuyavian-Pomeranian Voivodeship (north-central Poland)
- Łąkie, Mogilno County in Kuyavian-Pomeranian Voivodeship (north-central Poland)
- Łąkie, Lubusz Voivodeship (west Poland)
- Łąkie, Gmina Lipnica in Pomeranian Voivodeship (north Poland)
- Łąkie, Gdańsk County in Pomeranian Voivodeship (north Poland)
- Łąkie, West Pomeranian Voivodeship (north-west Poland)
