= Polichnowo-Piaski =

- Village
- Location within Poland
- Coordinates: 52°46′34″N 18°59′28″E
- Country: Poland
- Voivodeship: Kuyavian-Pomeranian
- County: Lipno
- Gmina: Bobrowniki

Polichnowo-Piaski (Polish pronunciation: [pɔlixˈnɔvɔ ˈpjaskʲi]) is a village in the administrative district of Gmina Bobrowniki, within Lipno County, Kuyavian-Pomeranian Voivodeship, in north-central Poland.
