= Bógpomóż Nowy =

- Village
- Location within Poland
- Coordinates: 52°45′33″N 18°58′26″E
- Country: Poland
- Voivodeship: Kuyavian-Pomeranian
- County: Lipno
- Gmina: Bobrowniki
- Population: 80

Bógpomóż Nowy [bukˈpɔmuʂ ˈnɔvɨ] is a village in the administrative district of Gmina Bobrowniki, within Lipno County, Kuyavian-Pomeranian Voivodeship, in north-central Poland.
