= Gmina Tłuchowo =

Gmina Tłuchowo Tłuchowo Commune
- Gmina
- Flag Coat of arms
- Interactive map of Gmina Tłuchowo
- Coordinates (Tłuchowo): 52°45′N 19°28′E
- Country: Poland
- Voivodeship: Kuyavian-Pomeranian
- County: Lipno
- Seat: Tłuchowo

Area
  - Total: 98.67 km^{2} (38.10 sq mi)

Population (2006)
  - Total: 4,634
  - Density: 46.96/km^{2} (121.6/sq mi)
- Website: http://www.tluchowo.com.pl/

Gmina Tłuchowo is a rural gmina (administrative district) in Lipno County, Kuyavian-Pomeranian Voivodeship, in north-central Poland. Its seat is the village of Tłuchowo, which lies approximately 24 kilometres (15 mi) south-east of Lipno and 66 km (41 mi) south-east of Toruń.

The gmina covers an area of 98.67 square kilometres (38.1 sq mi), and as of 2006 its total population is 4,634.

== Villages ==
Gmina Tłuchowo contains the villages and settlements of Borowo, Jasień, Julkowo, Kamień Kmiecy, Kamień Kotowy, Kłobukowo, Koziróg Leśny, Koziróg Rzeczny, Małomin, Marianki, Michałowo, Mysłakówko, Mysłakowo, Nowa Turza, Podole, Popowo, Rumunki Jasieńskie, Suminek, Tłuchówek, Tłuchowo, Trzcianka, Turza Wilcza, Wyczałkowo and Źródła.

== Neighbouring gminas ==
Gmina Tłuchowo is bordered by the gminas of Brudzeń Duży, Dobrzyń nad Wisłą, Mochowo, Skępe and Wielgie.
