= Babie Ławy =

- Village
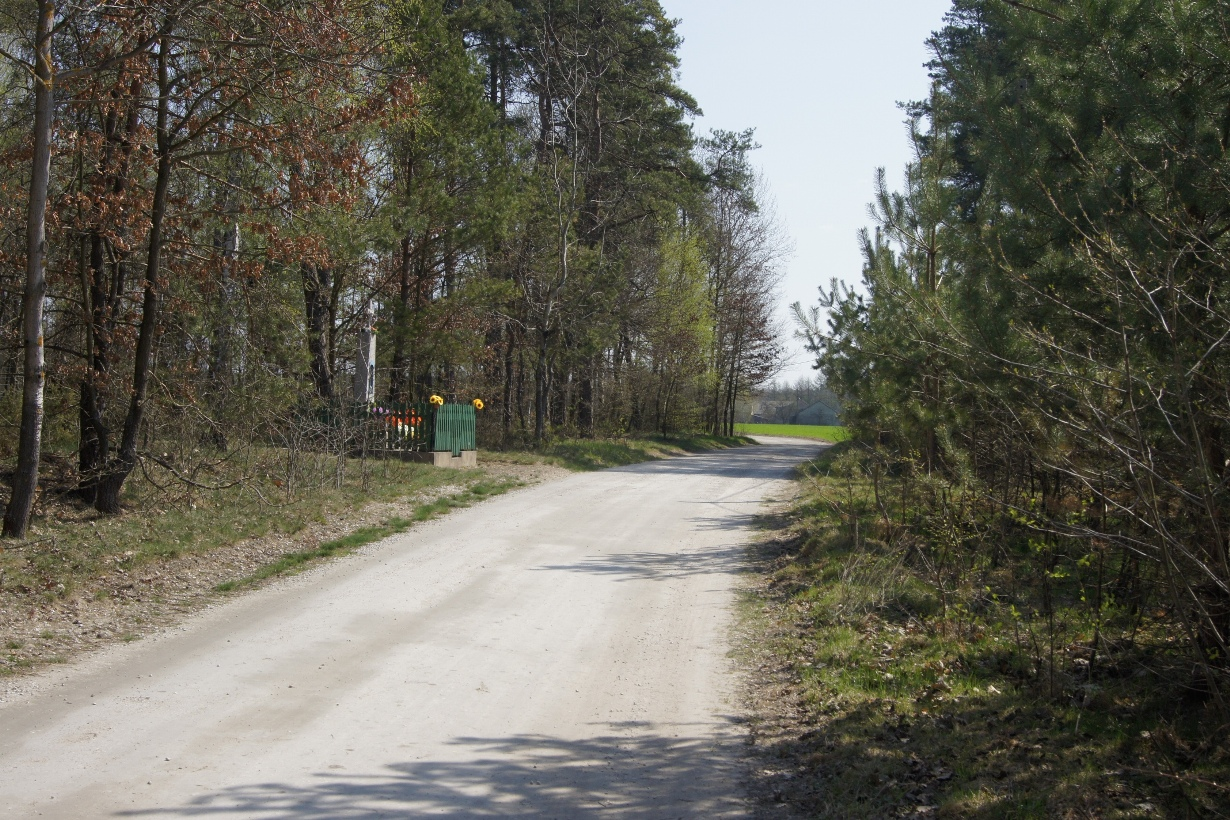
- Kapliczka

- Location within Poland
- Coordinates: 52°52′N 19°25′E
- Country: Poland
- Voivodeship: Kuyavian-Pomeranian
- County: Lipno
- Gmina: Skępe

Babie Ławy [ˈbabjɛ ˈwavɨ] is a village in the administrative district of Gmina Skępe, within Lipno County, Kuyavian-Pomeranian Voivodeship, in north-central Poland.
