= Marianki, Lipno County =

Marianki
- Village
- Location within Poland
- Coordinates: 52°45′38″N 19°28′2″E
- Country: Poland
- Voivodeship: Kuyavian-Pomeranian
- County: Lipno
- Gmina: Tłuchowo
- Population: 100

Marianki [maˈrjaŋki] is a village in the administrative district of Gmina Tłuchowo, within Lipno County, Kuyavian-Pomeranian Voivodeship, in north-central Poland.
