= Guzowatka =

Guzowatka may refer to the following places:

- Guzowatka, Kuyavian-Pomeranian Voivodeship (north-central Poland)
- Guzowatka, Ostrołęka County in Masovian Voivodeship (east-central Poland)
- Guzowatka, Wołomin County in Masovian Voivodeship (east-central Poland)
