= Rachcinek =

- Village
- Location within Poland
- Coordinates: 52°43′59″N 19°01′07″E
- Country: Poland
- Voivodeship: Kuyavian-Pomeranian
- County: Lipno
- Gmina: Bobrowniki

Rachcinek [raxˈt͡ɕinɛk] is a village in the administrative district of Gmina Bobrowniki, within Lipno County, Kuyavian-Pomeranian Voivodeship, in north-central Poland.
