= Żagno =

- Village
- Location within Poland
- Coordinates: 52°50′53″N 19°18′46″E
- Country: Poland
- Voivodeship: Kuyavian-Pomeranian
- County: Lipno
- Gmina: Skępe
- Time zone: UTC+1 (CET)
  - Summer (DST): UTC+2 (CEST)
- Vehicle registration: CLI

Żagno [ˈʐaɡnɔ] is a village in the administrative district of Gmina Skępe, within Lipno County, Kuyavian-Pomeranian Voivodeship, in north-central Poland.

== History ==
During the German occupation of Poland (World War II), Żagno was one of the sites of executions of Poles, carried out by the Germans in 1939 as part of the Intelligenzaktion.
