= Narutowo =

- Village
- Location within Poland
- Coordinates: 52°54′N 19°18′E
- Country: Poland
- Voivodeship: Kuyavian-Pomeranian
- County: Lipno
- Gmina: Skępe

Narutowo ([naruˈtɔvɔ]) is a village in the administrative district of Gmina Skępe, within Lipno County, Kuyavian-Pomeranian Voivodeship, in north-central Poland.
