= Józefkowo =

Józefkowo may refer to the following places:

- Józefkowo, Nakło County in Kuyavian-Pomeranian Voivodeship (north-central Poland)
- Józefkowo, Wąbrzeźno County in Kuyavian-Pomeranian Voivodeship (north-central Poland)
- Józefkowo, Lipno County in Kuyavian-Pomeranian Voivodeship (north-central Poland)
