= Koziołek, Kuyavian-Pomeranian Voivodeship =

Koziołek
- Village
- Location within Poland
- Coordinates: 52°52′6″N 19°28′4″E
- Country: Poland
- Voivodeship: Kuyavian-Pomeranian
- County: Lipno
- Gmina: Skępe

Koziołek [kɔˈʑɔwɛk] is a village in the administrative district of Gmina Skępe, within Lipno County, Kuyavian-Pomeranian Voivodeship, in north-central Poland.
