= Kamień Kmiecy =

- Village
- Location within Poland
- Coordinates: 52°45′00″N 19°25′00″E
- Country: Poland
- Voivodeship: Kuyavian-Pomeranian
- County: Lipno
- Gmina: Tłuchowo

Kamień Kmiecy (Polish pronunciation: [ˈkamjɛj̃ ˈkmjɛtsɨ]) is a village in the administrative district of Gmina Tłuchowo, within Lipno County, Kuyavian-Pomeranian Voivodeship, in north-central Poland.
