= Rumunki Tupadelskie =

- Village
- Location within Poland
- Coordinates: 52°44′9″N 19°18′58″E
- Country: Poland
- Voivodeship: Kuyavian-Pomeranian
- County: Lipno
- Gmina: Wielgie

Rumunki Tupadelskie [ruˈmuŋki tupaˈdɛlskʲɛ] is a village in the administrative district of Gmina Wielgie, within Lipno County, Kuyavian-Pomeranian Voivodeship, in north-central Poland.
