= Tupadły, Lipno County =

Tupadły
- Village
- Location within Poland
- Coordinates: 52°44′N 19°18′E
- Country: Poland
- Voivodeship: Kuyavian-Pomeranian
- County: Lipno
- Gmina: Wielgie

Tupadły [tuˈpadwɨ] is a village in the administrative district of Gmina Wielgie, within Lipno County, Kuyavian-Pomeranian Voivodeship, in north-central Poland.
