= Sarnowo, Lipno County =

Sarnowo
- Village
- Location within Poland
- Coordinates: 52°56′03″N 19°21′19″E
- Country: Poland
- Voivodeship: Kuyavian-Pomeranian
- County: Lipno
- Gmina: Skępe

Sarnowo [sarˈnɔvɔ] is a village in the administrative district of Gmina Skępe, within Lipno County, Kuyavian-Pomeranian Voivodeship, in north-central Poland.
