= Kamienica, Gmina Skępe =

Kamienica
- Village
- Location within Poland
- Coordinates: 52°55′3″N 19°23′52″E
- Country: Poland
- Voivodeship: Kuyavian-Pomeranian
- County: Lipno
- Gmina: Skępe

Kamienica [kamjɛˈnit͡sa] is a village in the administrative district of Gmina Skępe, within Lipno County, Kuyavian-Pomeranian Voivodeship, in north-central Poland.
