= Czarne, Kuyavian-Pomeranian Voivodeship =

Czarne
- Village
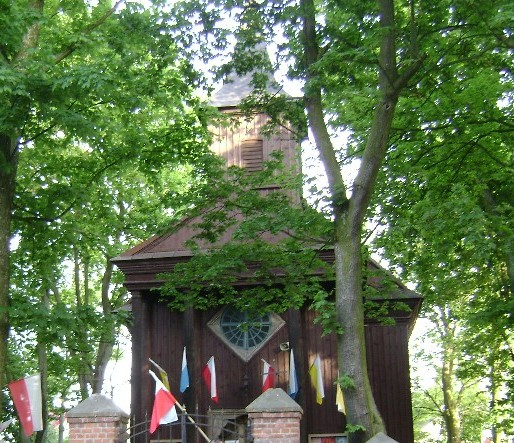

- Location within Poland
- Coordinates: 52°47′10″N 19°15′26″E
- Country: Poland
- Voivodeship: Kuyavian-Pomeranian
- County: Lipno
- Gmina: Wielgie

Czarne ([ˈt͡ʂarnɛ]; German: 1942–1945 Schwarzen) is a village in the administrative district of Gmina Wielgie, within Lipno County, Kuyavian-Pomeranian Voivodeship, in north-central Poland.
