= Zaduszniki =

Zaduszniki may refer to the following villages in Poland:

- Zaduszniki, Kuyavian-Pomeranian Voivodeship (north-central Poland)
- Zaduszniki, Subcarpathian Voivodeship (south-east Poland)
