= Grabówiec, Lipno County =

Grabówiec
- Village
- Location within Poland
- Coordinates: 52°50′11″N 19°24′57″E
- Country: Poland
- Voivodeship: Kuyavian-Pomeranian
- County: Lipno
- Gmina: Skępe
- Population: 90

Grabówiec [ɡraˈbuvjɛt͡s] is a village in the administrative district of Gmina Skępe, within Lipno County, Kuyavian-Pomeranian Voivodeship, in north-central Poland.
