= Julkowo =

- Village
- Location within Poland
- Coordinates: 52°46′23″N 19°26′04″E
- Country: Poland
- Voivodeship: Kuyavian-Pomeranian
- County: Lipno
- Gmina: Tłuchowo

Julkowo [julˈkɔvɔ] is a village in the administrative district of Gmina Tłuchowo, within Lipno County, Kuyavian-Pomeranian Voivodeship, in north-central Poland.
