= Tłuchowo =

- Village
- Location within Poland
- Coordinates: 52°45′N 19°28′E
- Country: Poland
- Voivodeship: Kuyavian-Pomeranian
- County: Lipno
- Gmina: Tłuchowo
- Population: 1,159

Tłuchowo [twuˈxɔvɔ] is a village in Lipno County, Kuyavian-Pomeranian Voivodeship, in north-central Poland. It is the seat of the gmina (administrative district) called Gmina Tłuchowo.
