= Skępe =

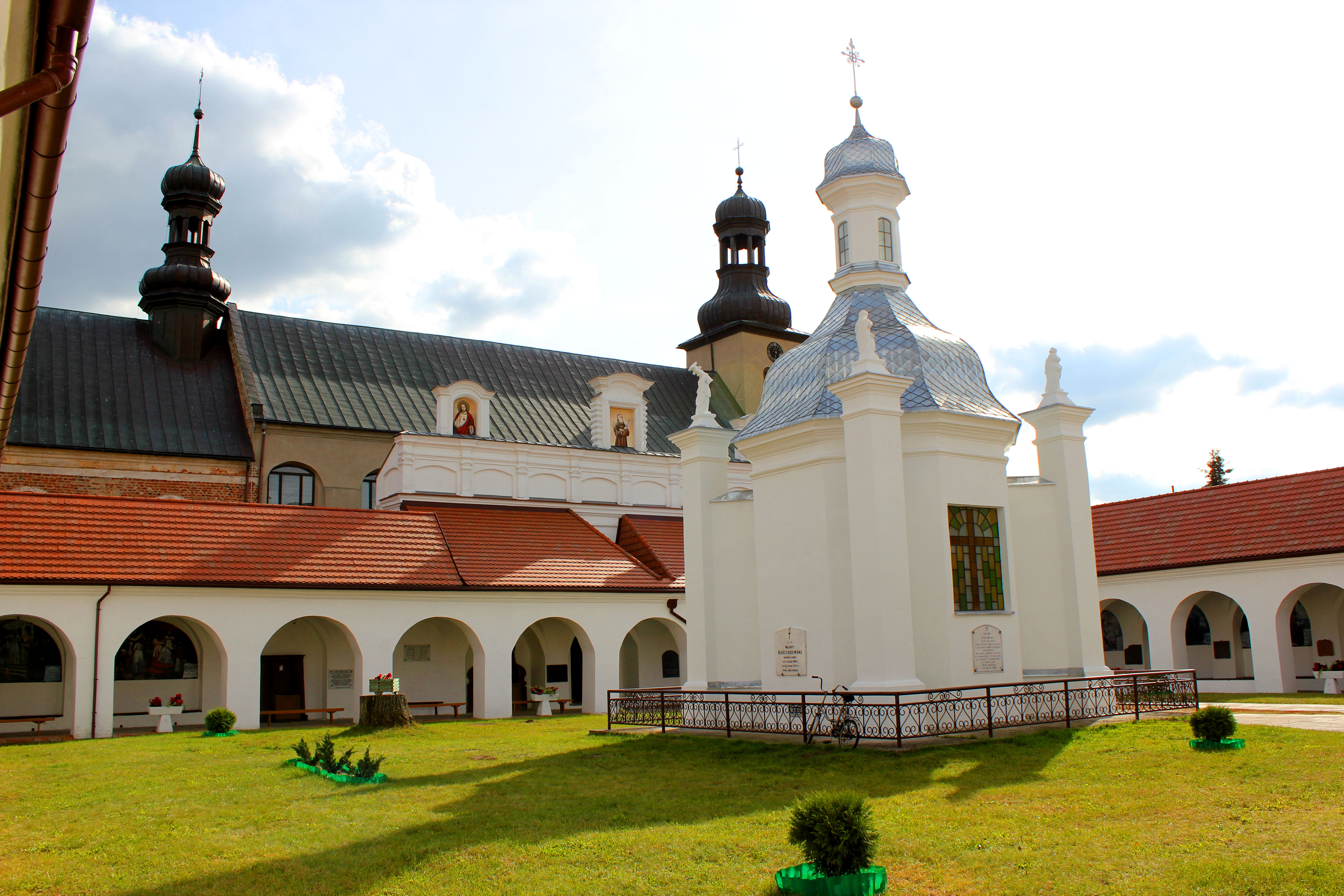
- Bernardine Monastery in Skępe

- Coat of arms

- Location within Poland
- Coordinates: 52°51′58″N 19°20′49″E
- Country: Poland
- Voivodeship: Kuyavian-Pomeranian
- County: Lipno
- Gmina: Skępe
- Town rights: 1445

Government
  - Mayor: Andrzej Józef Gatyński

Area
  - Total: 7.48 km^{2} (2.89 sq mi)

Population (2012)
  - Total: 7,790
  - Density: 1,040/km^{2} (2,700/sq mi)
- Time zone: UTC+1 (CET)
  - Summer (DST): UTC+2 (CEST)
- Postal code: 87-630
- Vehicle registration: CLI
- Website: http://www.skepe.pl

Skępe [ˈskɛmpɛ] is a town in Lipno County, Kuyavian-Pomeranian Voivodeship, Poland, with 7790 inhabitants (2012). It is the main sanctuary of Dobrzyń Land, with image of Our Lady crowned officially in 1755.

== History ==
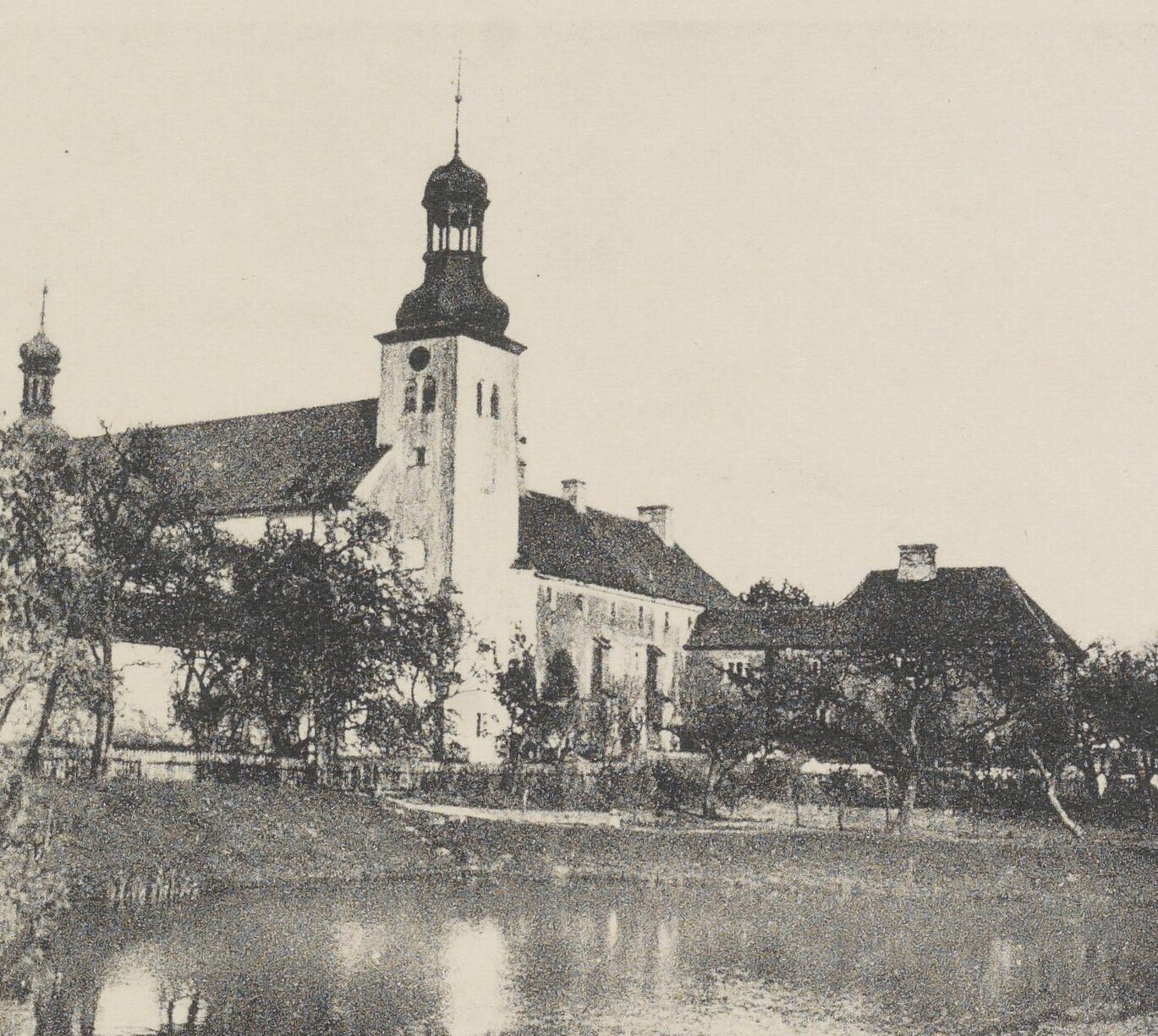
Monastery in 1908

Skępe developed from a medieval Slavic stronghold. It was granted town rights in 1445 by King Casimir IV of Poland. In 1498 the Bernardines came to Skępe from Koło and a monastery was built, with the Church of the Annunciation. Skępe was a private town of Polish nobility, administratively located in the Lipno County in the Inowrocław Voivodeship in the Greater Poland Province of the Kingdom of Poland. The coat of arms of Skępe contains the Ogończyk coat of arms of the Kościelecki noble family, which was essential in the town's development in the 15th century. Two, and from 1530 three, annual fairs were held in Skępe.

The town was annexed by Prussia in the Second Partition of Poland in 1793. In 1807 it was regained by Poles and included within the short-lived Duchy of Warsaw, and in 1815 it became part of so-called Congress Poland in the Russian Partition of Poland. After the unsuccessful Polish January Uprising, the Russians closed down the monastery and church in 1864. Skępe was reintegrated with Poland in 1918, when the country regained independence after World War I. During the Polish–Soviet War, the Soviets captured the town on 13–14 August 1920, and then briefly occupied it. The Soviets looted the monastery and tortured the local Polish parish priest Albin Żmijewski. According to the 1921 census, the population was 85.3% Polish and 14.5% Jewish.

During World War II, Skępe was occupied by Germany from 1939 to 1945. During the Intelligenzaktion in 1939, many inhabitants were murdered in large massacres carried out by the Germans in the Barbarka forest and in nearby Karnkowo. Arrested Polish teachers were imprisoned in Włocławek. The occupiers also carried out expulsions of Poles, whose houses were handed over to German colonists as part of the Lebensraum policy. In 1942, the Germans renamed the town to Schemmensee to erase traces of Polish origin, however the original Polish name was restored in 1945 after the occupation ended.

== Gallery ==
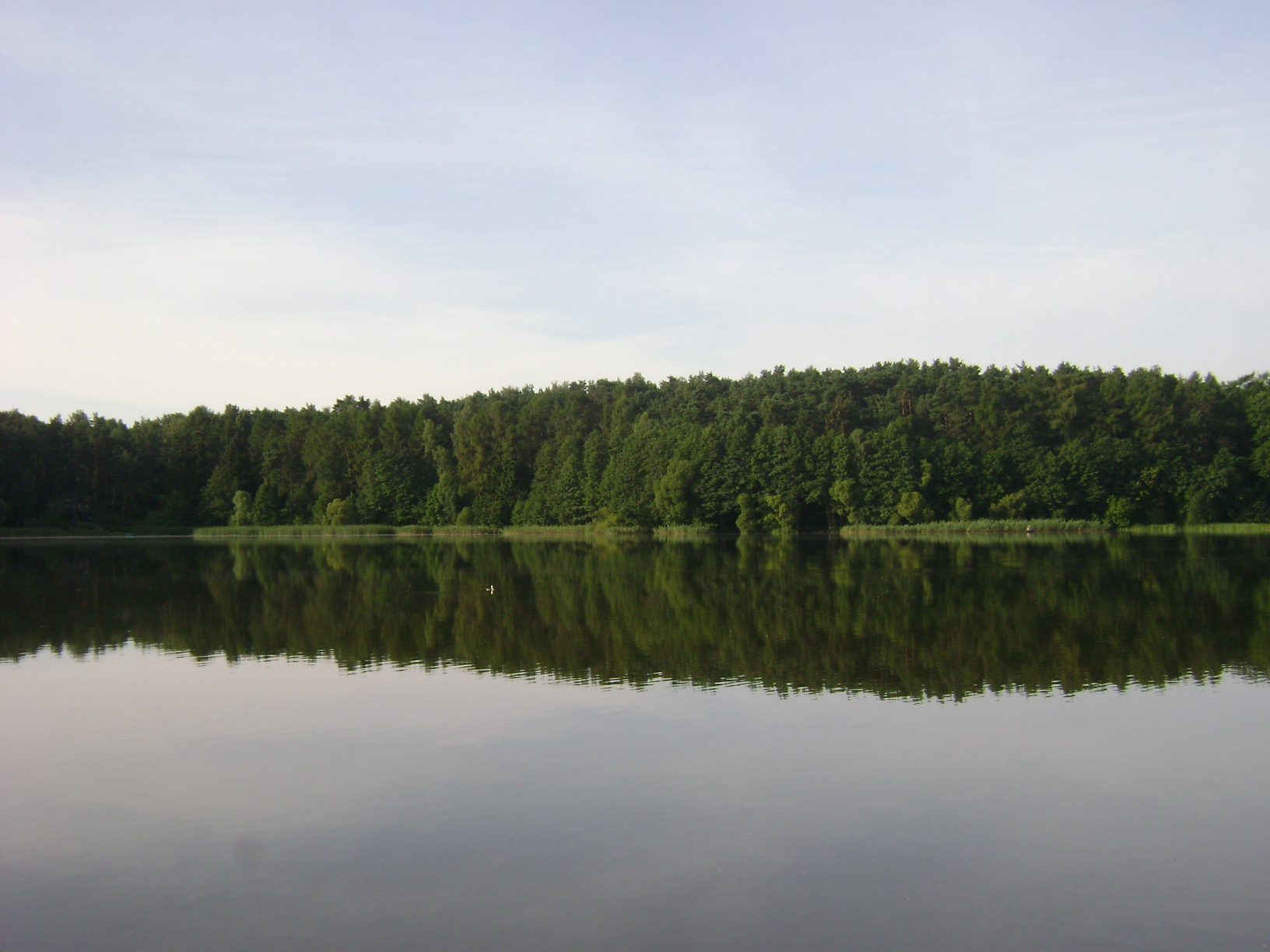
Wielkie Lake

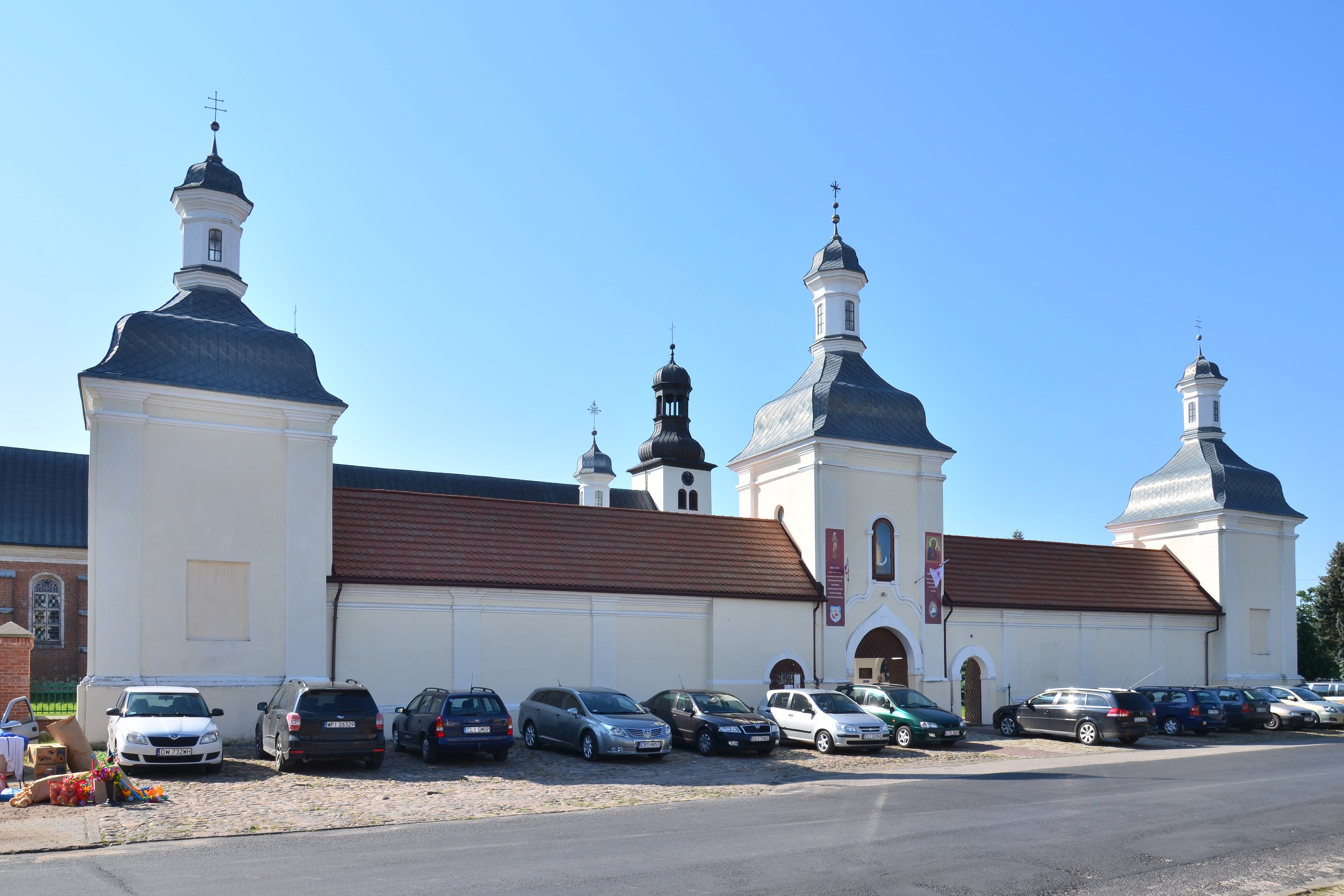
Bernardine Monastery

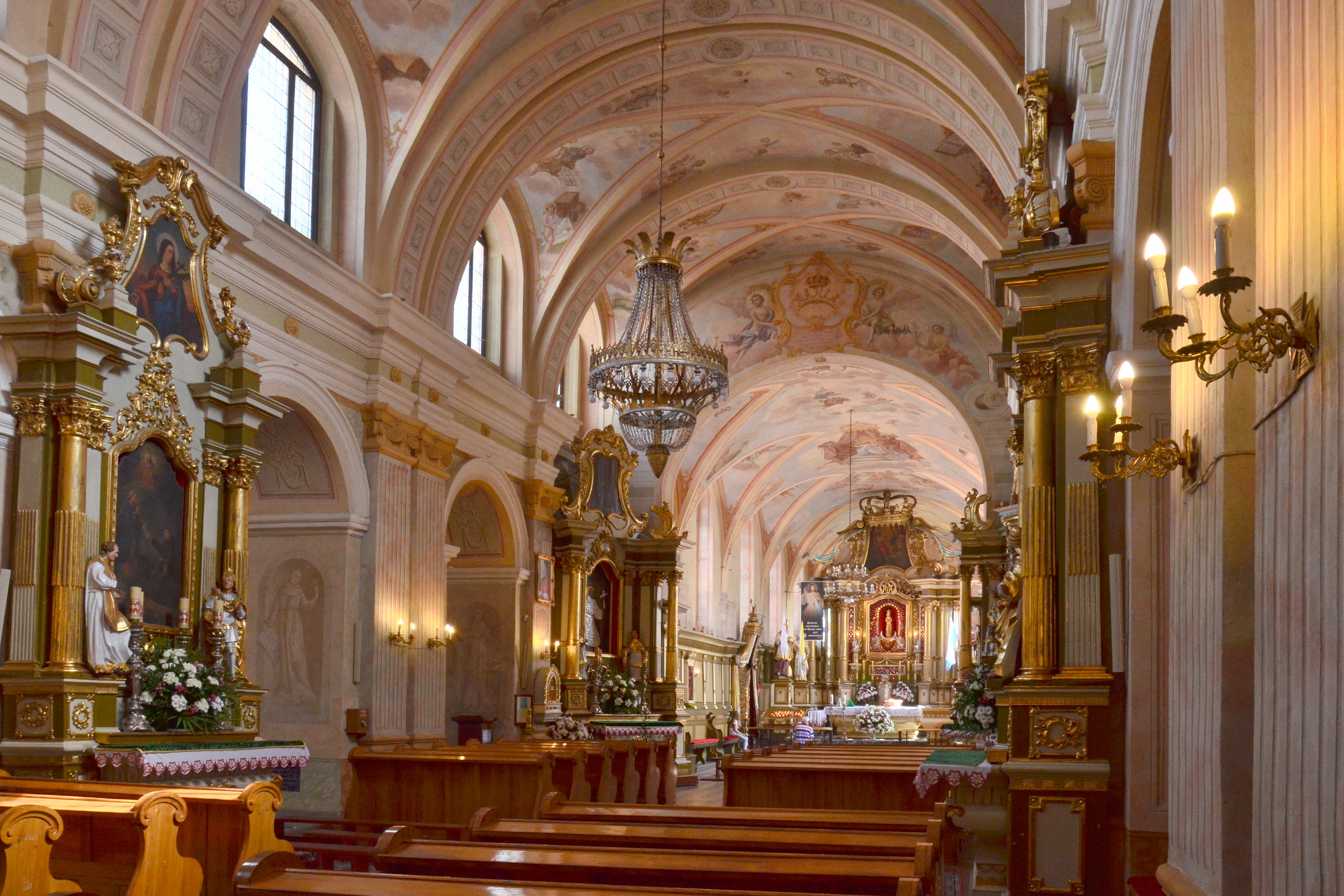
Interior of the Church of the Annunciation

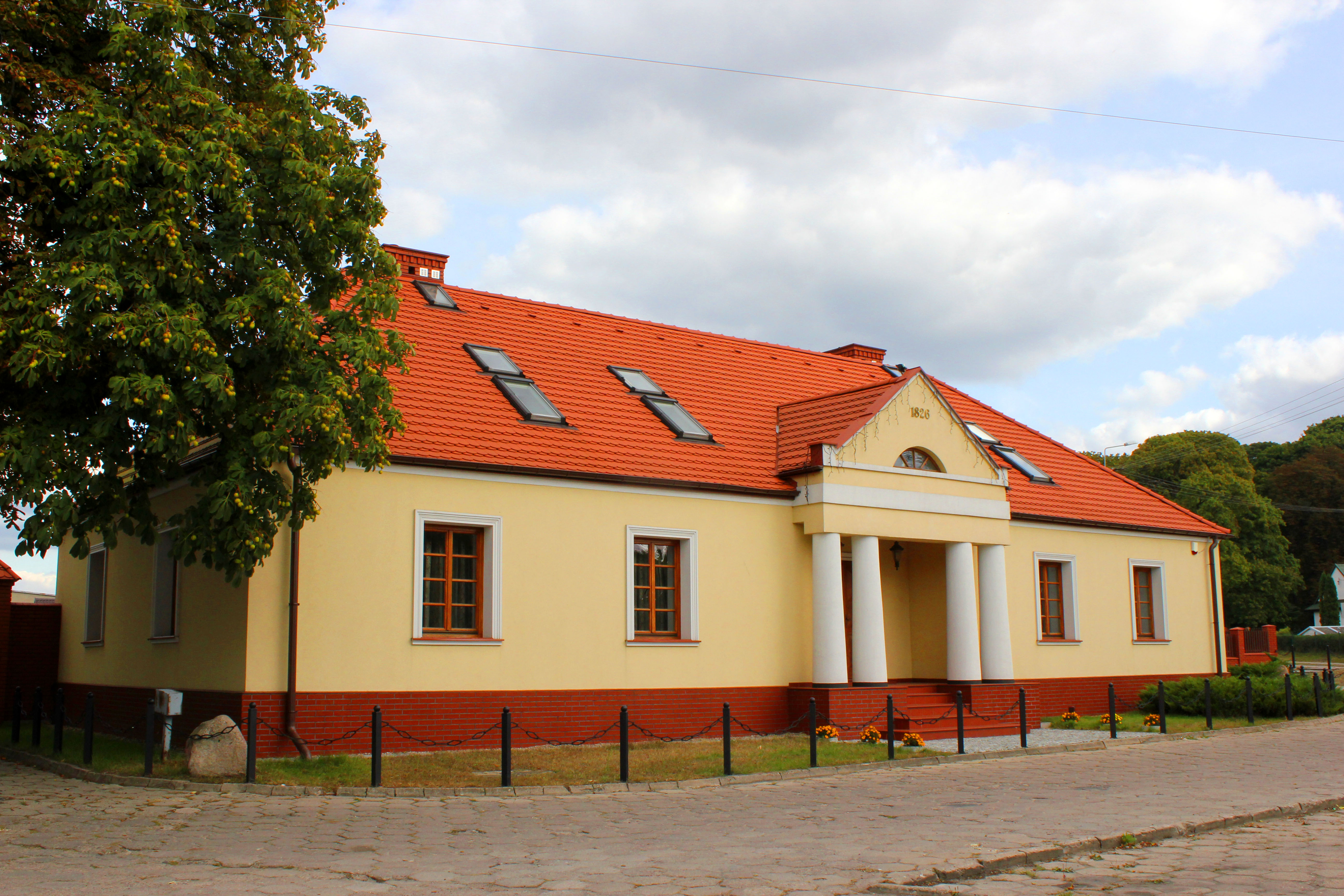
Pod Kasztanami Inn
