= Kukowo, Kuyavian-Pomeranian Voivodeship =

Kukowo
- Village
- Location within Poland
- Coordinates: 52°50′29″N 19°25′46″E
- Country: Poland
- Voivodeship: Kuyavian-Pomeranian
- County: Lipno
- Gmina: Skępe

Kukowo [kuˈkɔvɔ] is a village in the administrative district of Gmina Skępe, within Lipno County, Kuyavian-Pomeranian Voivodeship, in north-central Poland.
