= Zaduszniki, Kuyavian-Pomeranian Voivodeship =

Zaduszniki
- Village
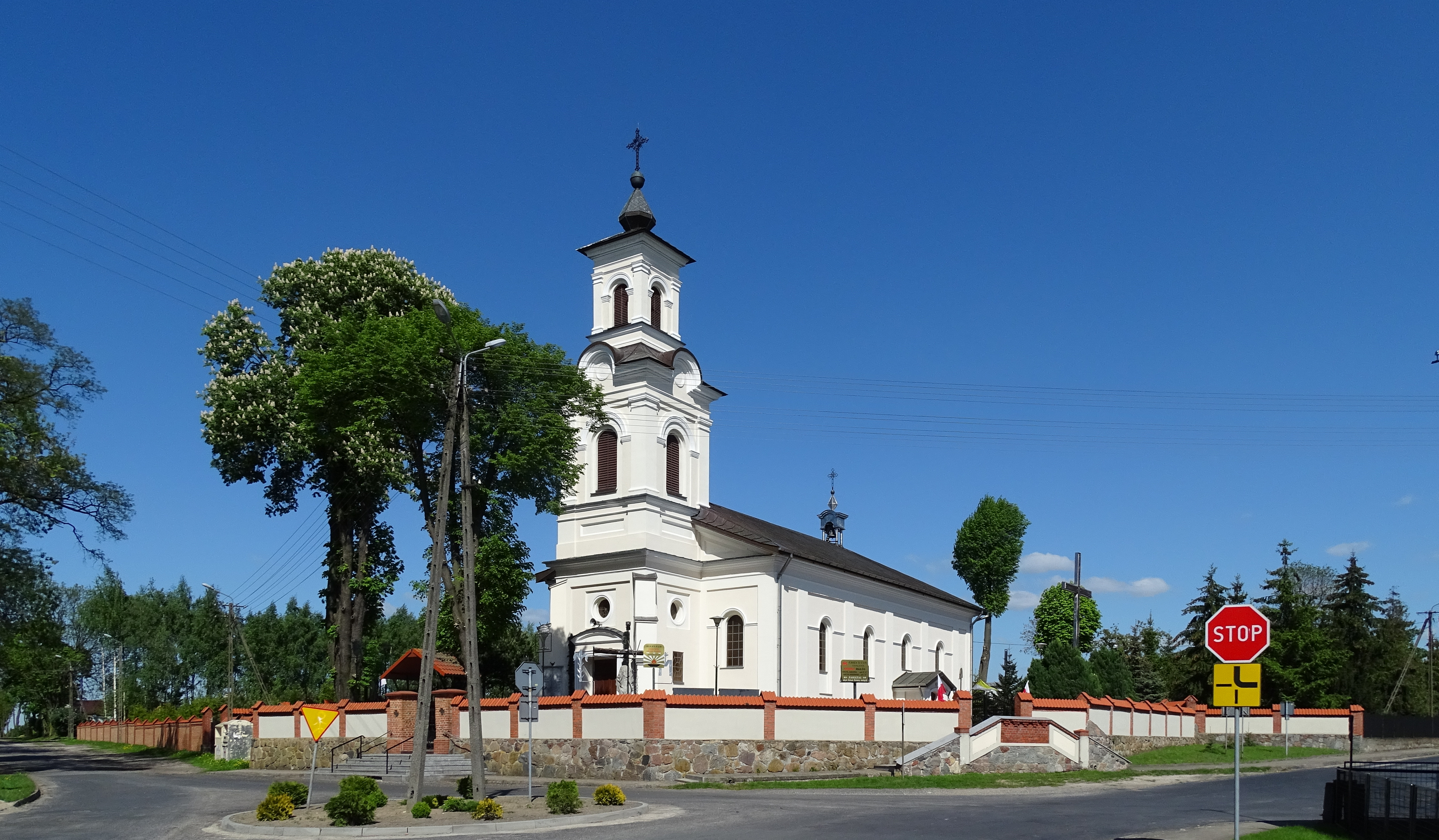

- Location within Poland
- Coordinates: 52°42′57″N 19°11′41″E
- Country: Poland
- Voivodeship: Kuyavian-Pomeranian
- County: Lipno
- Gmina: Wielgie

Zaduszniki [zaduʂˈniki] is a village in north-central Poland, located in the administrative district of Gmina Wielgie, within Lipno County, Kuyavian-Pomeranian Voivodeship.
