= Pokrzywnik, Kuyavian-Pomeranian Voivodeship =

Pokrzywnik
- Village
- Location within Poland
- Coordinates: 52°50′13″N 19°18′6″E
- Country: Poland
- Voivodeship: Kuyavian-Pomeranian
- County: Lipno
- Gmina: Skępe
- Population: 120

Pokrzywnik [pɔˈkʂɨvnik] is a village in the administrative district of Gmina Skępe, within Lipno County, Kuyavian-Pomeranian Voivodeship, in north-central Poland.
