= Karnkowo, Kuyavian-Pomeranian Voivodeship =

Karnkowo
- Village
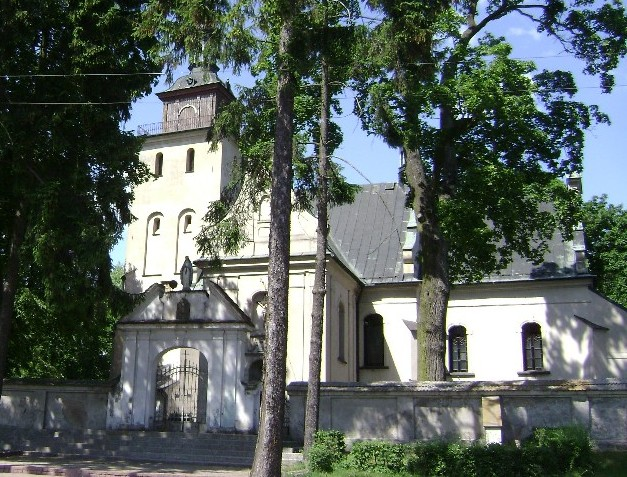
- Church of Saint Hedwig in Karnkowo

- Location within Poland
- Coordinates: 52°52′N 19°15′E
- Country: Poland
- Voivodeship: Kuyavian-Pomeranian
- County: Lipno
- Gmina: Gmina Lipno
- Time zone: UTC+1 (CET)
  - Summer (DST): UTC+2 (CEST)
- Vehicle registration: CLI

Karnkowo [karnˈkɔvɔ] is a village in the administrative district of Gmina Lipno, within Lipno County, Kuyavian-Pomeranian Voivodeship, in north-central Poland. It is located in the historic Dobrzyń Land.

== History ==
During the German occupation of Poland (World War II), the forest of Karnkowo was the site of large massacres, in which Germans murdered around 200 Poles, inhabitants of Karnkowo, as well as nearby towns of Lipno and Skępe and other nearby villages. Local teacher Władysław Karczewski was among Polish teachers murdered in the Mauthausen concentration camp during the Intelligenzaktion.

== Notable people ==
- Stanisław Karnkowski (1520–1603), archbishop of Gniezno and Primate of Poland, bishop of Kuyavia, royal secretary of Polish kings, interrex in 1586–1587
- Józef Bartczak (1894–1940), Polish military officer, Katyn massacre victim
