= Lipno, Lipno County =

Town in Kuyavian-Pomeranian Voivodeship, Poland

Lipno
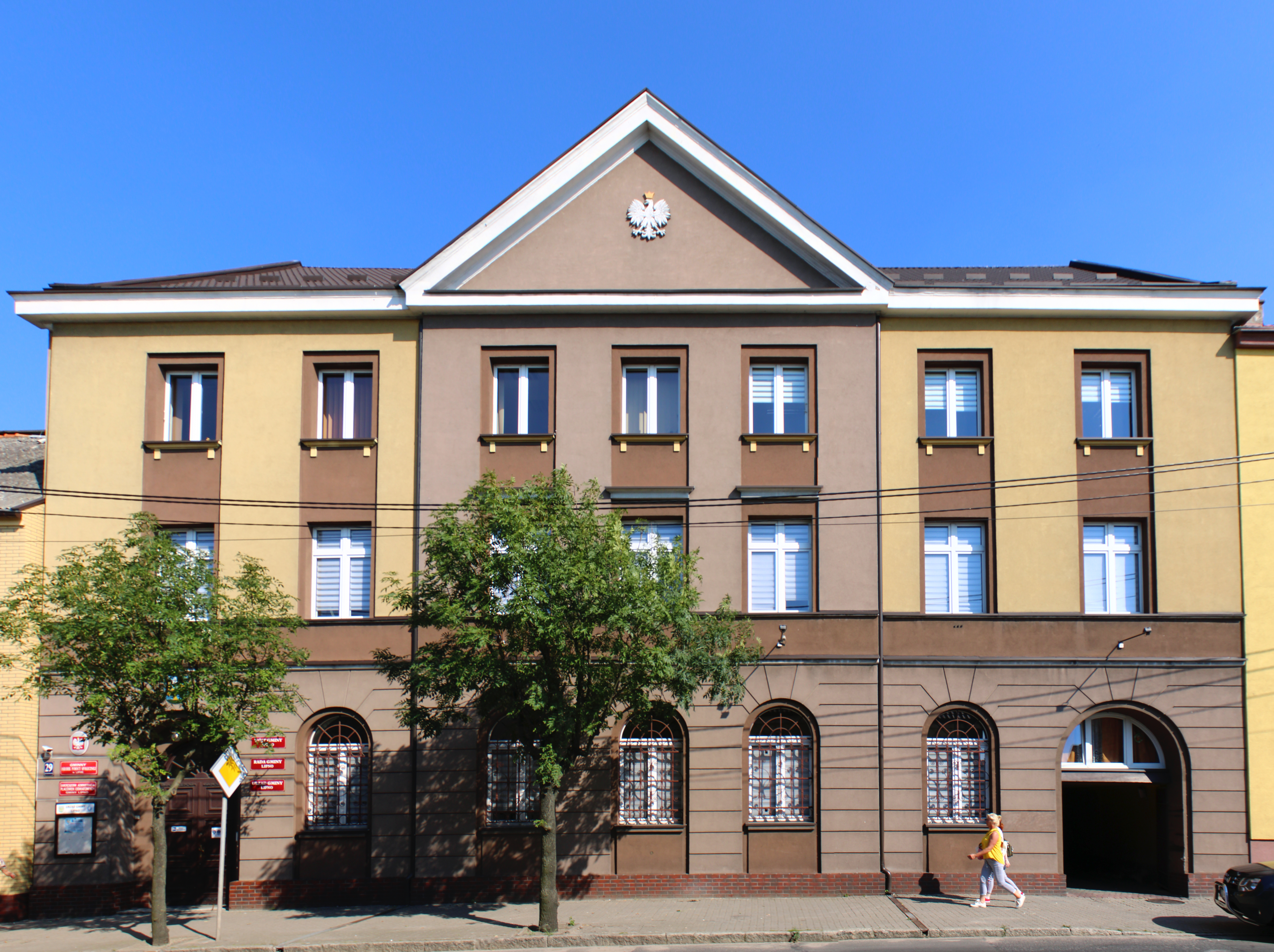
- Gmina office in Lipno

- Flag Coat of arms

- Location within Poland
- Coordinates: 52°50′44″N 19°10′45″E
- Country: Poland
- Voivodeship: Kuyavian-Pomeranian
- County: Lipno
- Gmina: Lipno (urban gmina)
- Town rights: 1349

Government
  - Mayor: Paweł Banasik

Area
  - Total: 10.99 km^{2} (4.24 sq mi)

Population (2010)
  - Total: 14,791
  - Density: 1,346/km^{2} (3,486/sq mi)
- Time zone: UTC+1 (CET)
  - Summer (DST): UTC+2 (CEST)
- Postal code: 87-600
- Car plates: CLI
- Website: http://www.umlipno.pl/

Lipno (Polish pronunciation: [ˈlipnɔ]) is a town in central Poland, in Kuyavian-Pomeranian Voivodeship, about 40 km (25 mi) southeast of Toruń. It is the administrative seat of Lipno County and of Gmina Lipno. Its population is 14,791 (2010).

== History ==
Lipno dates back to the Middle Ages, when it was part of the Piast-ruled Kingdom of Poland. In 1349 it was granted town rights. Administratively Lipno was located in the Dobrzyń Land in the Inowrocław Voivodeship in the Greater Poland Province, Crown of the Kingdom of Poland. Despite not being the capital of the Dobrzyń Land, Lipno became the region's most important centre and the seat of the sejmik of the Dobrzyń Land.

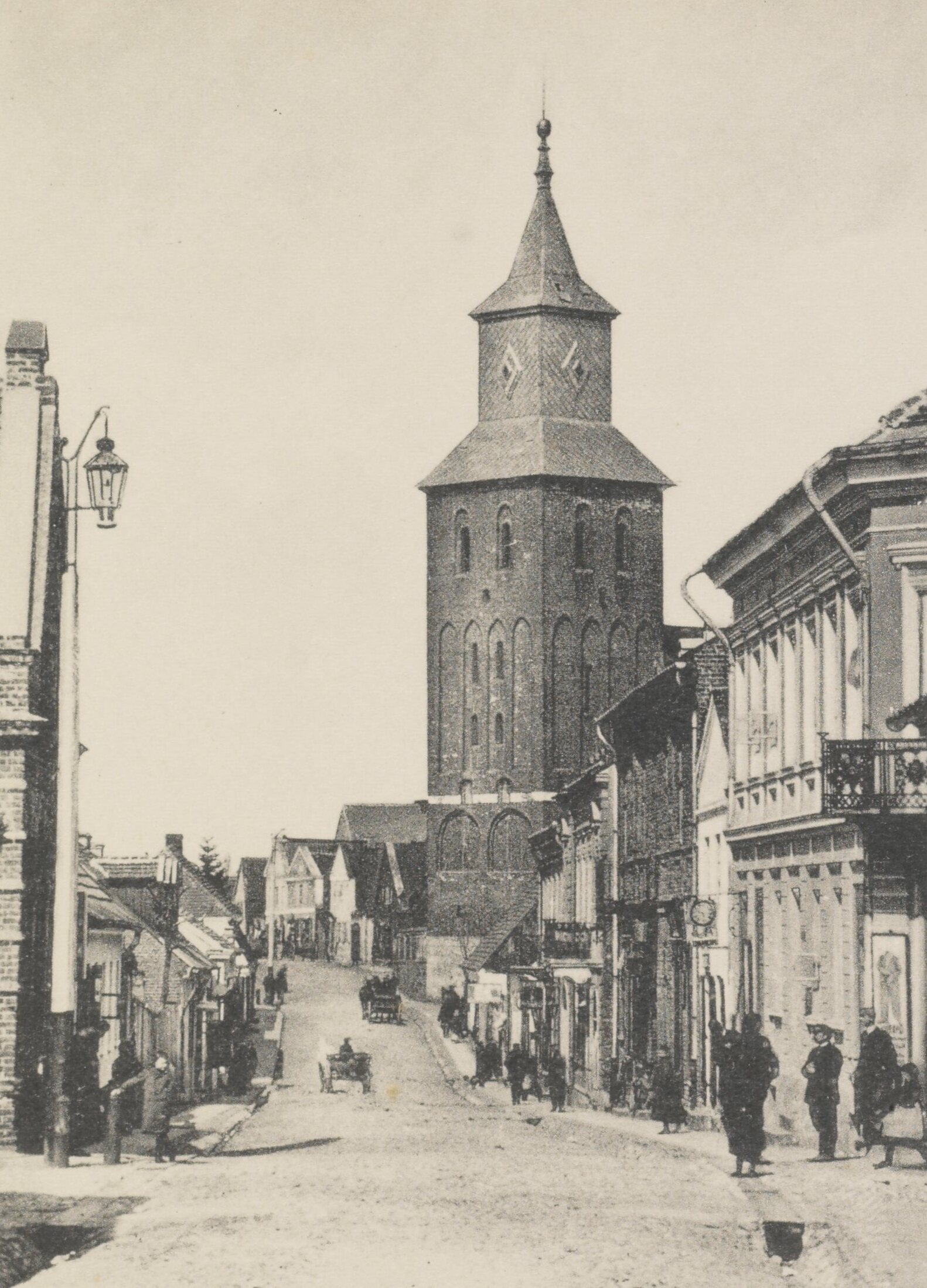
Lipno in 1908

The town was annexed by Prussia in the Second Partition of Poland in 1793, in 1807 it became part of the short-lived Polish Duchy of Warsaw and in 1815 it became part of so-called Congress Poland in the Russian Partition. Many inhabitants took part in the unsuccessful November and January Uprisings against Russia, after which Lipno was subject to severe persecutions. Nevertheless, local Poles founded various organisations. Lipno became part of independent Poland again, when the country proclaimed independence on 11 November 1918, afterwards the town's cultural life was revived.

During the Polish–Soviet War, the town was briefly occupied by the Soviets from 13–14 August 1920. The Soviets then plundered private homes and shops, as well as the municipal office, and terrorized the population. Prominent local activist and organizer of the Polish defense, Jerzy Starzyński, was subjected to gruesome tortures and murdered. Nearly half of the occupying security forces were local communist Jews, recruited mainly from the poor. Wealthy Jews and Orthodox Jews did not support the Soviets, and several wealthy Jews were robbed and murdered by the Soviets. Lipno was liberated by Poles on 20 August 1920. A monument to local Polish soldiers fallen in the war was erected in 1930.

In 1924, Zygmunt Uzarowicz, a former Polish independence activist in the Russian Partition of Poland, became the mayor of the town, and held office until the German invasion of Poland in 1939.

=== World War II ===
During the invasion of Poland, which started World War II, the town was raided by the Germans on 2 September 1939 and captured on 8 September.

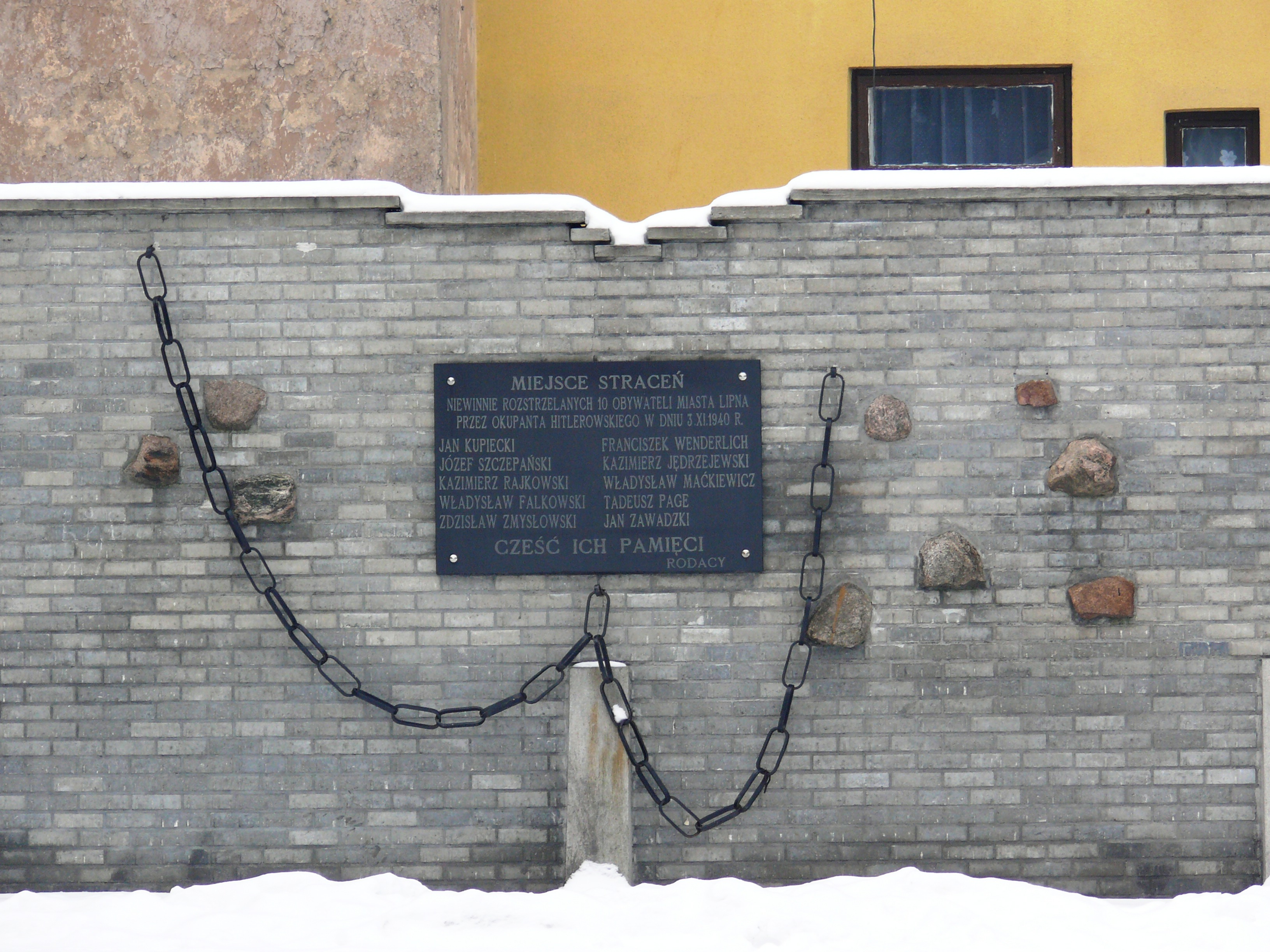
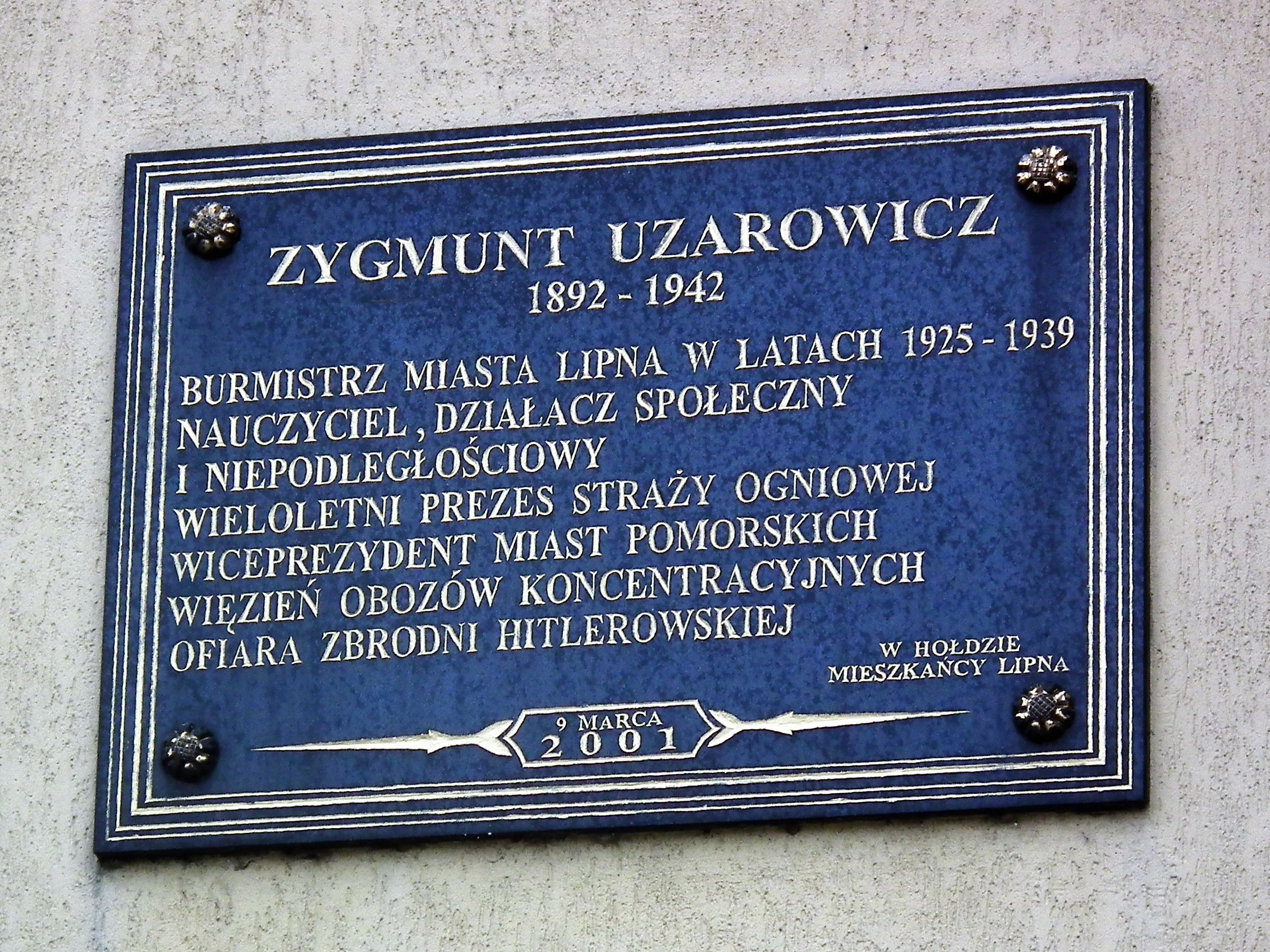
Memorials to victims of a German-perpetrated massacre from 1940 and to pre-war mayor Zygmunt Uzarowicz, killed by the Germans in 1942

During the German occupation, Poles were subject to mass arrests, expulsions and executions. A prison for Poles was established in the town. In October 1939, the Germans carried out mass arrests of Polish teachers and landowners from Lipno and surrounding villages, deceitfully gathering them to Lipno for alleged conferences on town matters. 71 teachers and several dozen landowners were arrested, imprisoned in concentration and forced labour camps, and mostly later murdered. Also 20 priests were arrested and imprisoned in the Stutthof concentration camp, where 13 of whom died. Around 200 Poles and Jews from Lipno and surrounding villages were murdered in the forest near Karnkowo. Next mass arrests of Poles were carried out in April 1940. 10 Poles were murdered in a public execution at the market square on 3 November 1940. The pre-war mayor Zygmunt Uzarowicz was arrested and imprisoned in Grudziądz in 1940, and then deported to the Dachau and Buchenwald concentration camps, where he was beaten to death by the Germans in 1942, whereas the local starost (head of the county administration) Edward Woronowicz was murdered by the Russians in the Katyn massacre in 1940.

In addition, about 3,300 Poles were expelled from the Lipno County, and Jews were deported to Nazi ghettos, however Poles managed to create an underground resistance movement. The resistance published the Iskra Wolności Polish underground newspaper in Lipno. In 1939, the Germans destroyed the Polish monument from 1930. It was rebuilt in 1992.

== Sports ==
The local football team is Mień Lipno, which competes in the lower leagues.

== Notable residents ==
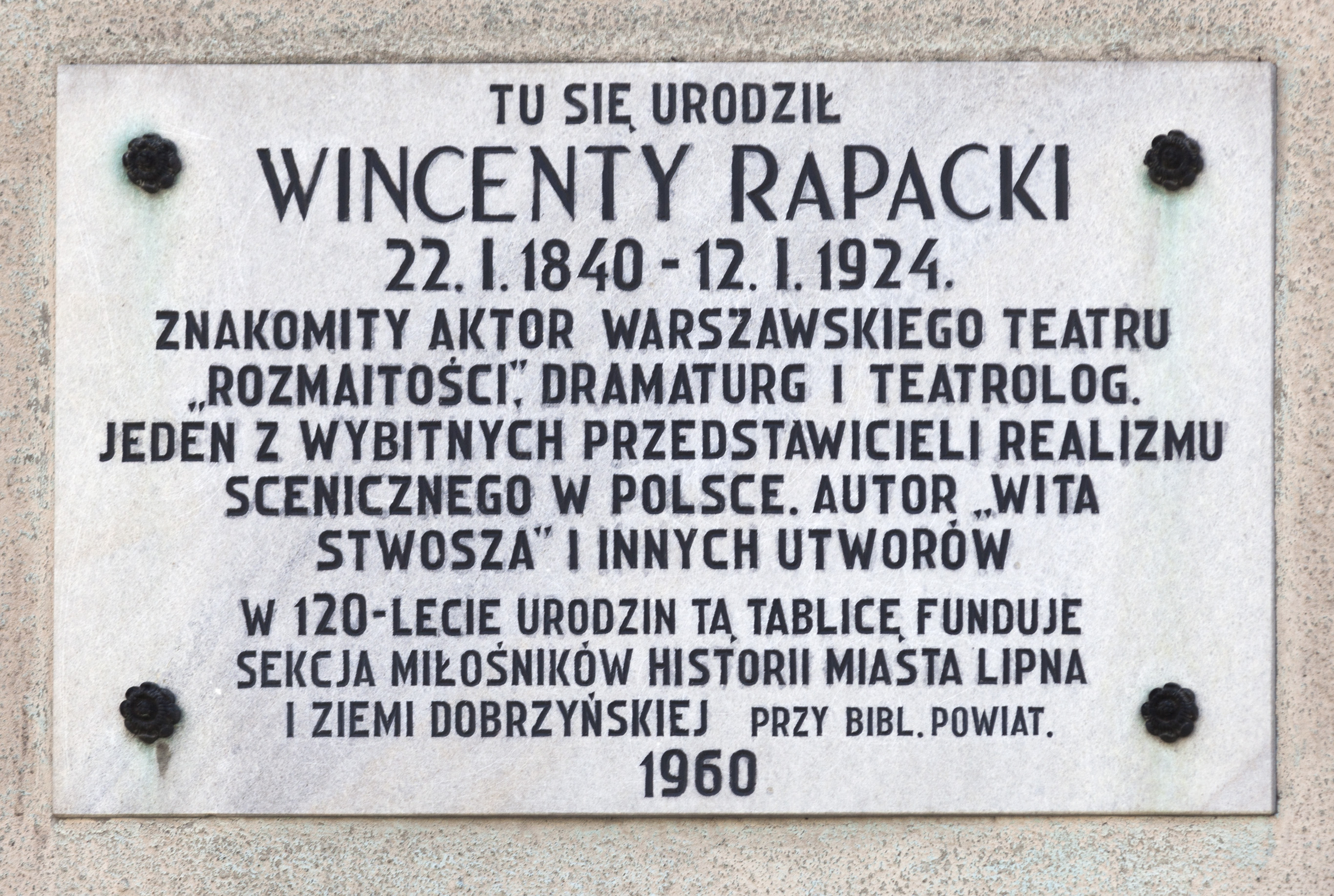
Memorial plaque at the birthplace of Wincenty Rapacki

- Wincenty Rapacki (1840–1924), Polish actor and theatre director
- Pola Negri (1897–1987), Polish stage and film actress and singer
- Ya'akov Meridor (born Yaakov Viniarsky; 1913–1995), Israeli politician, Minister, Irgun commander, and businessman
- Leszek Balcerowicz (born 1947), Polish economist

== Gallery ==
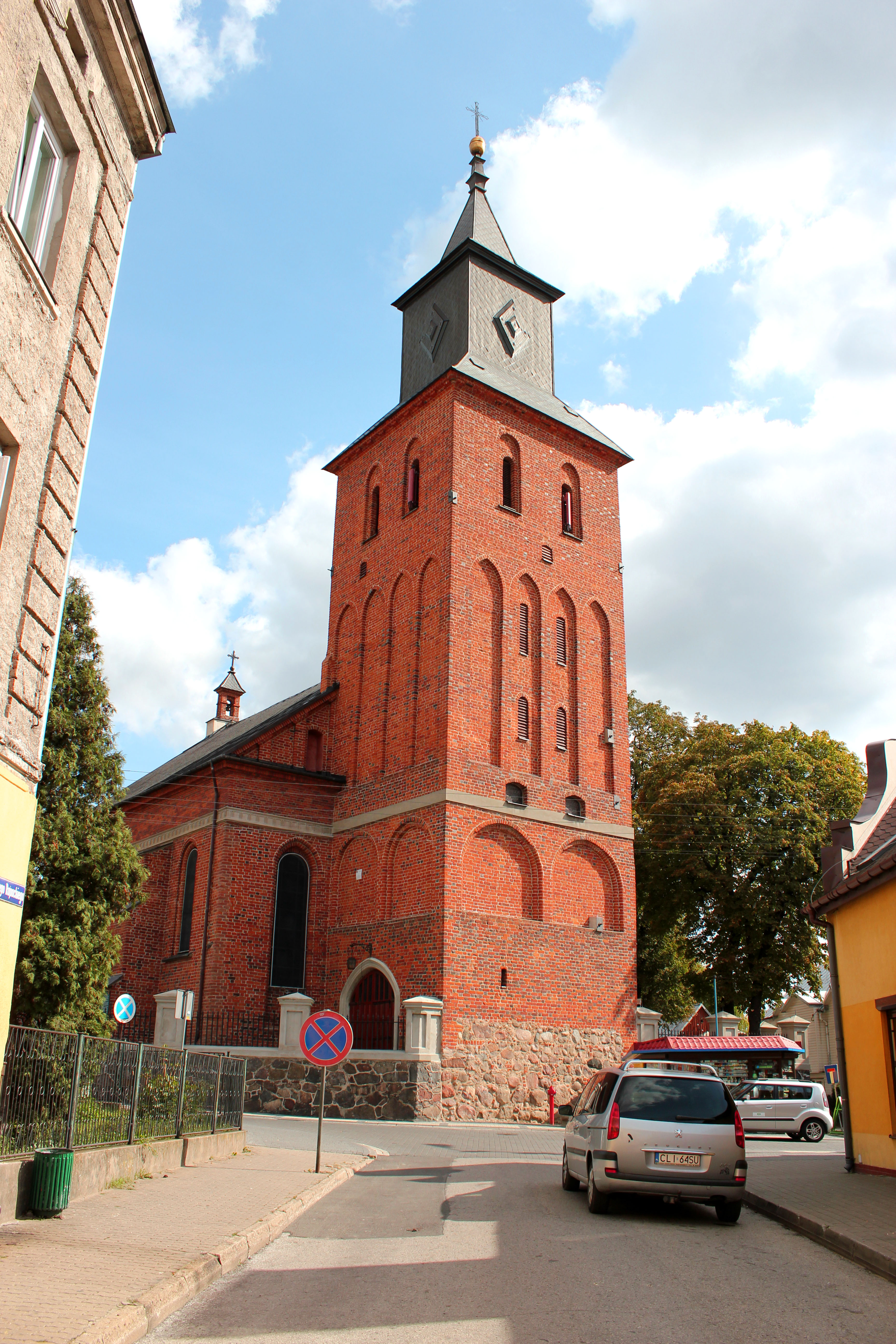
Church of the Assumption

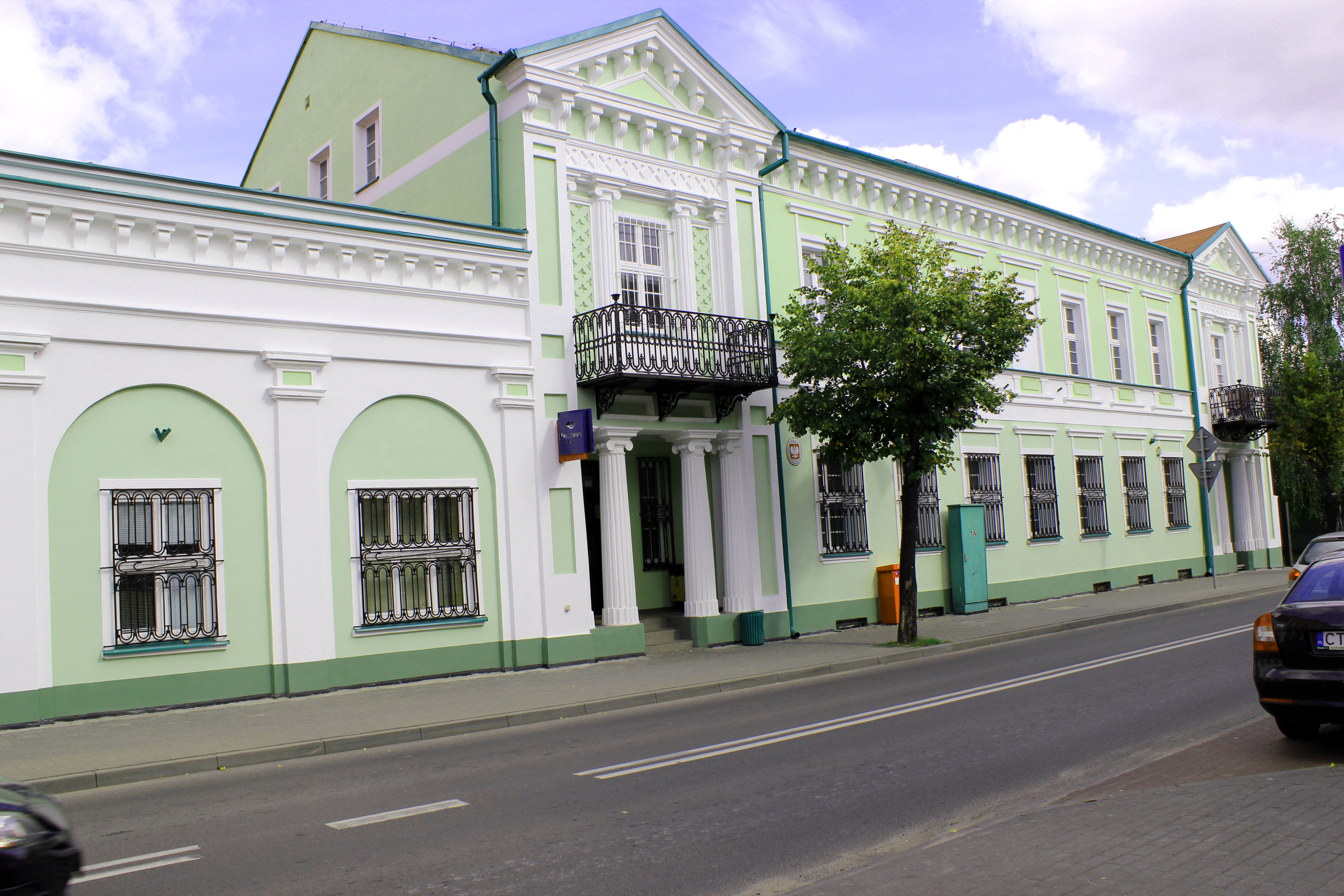
Post office

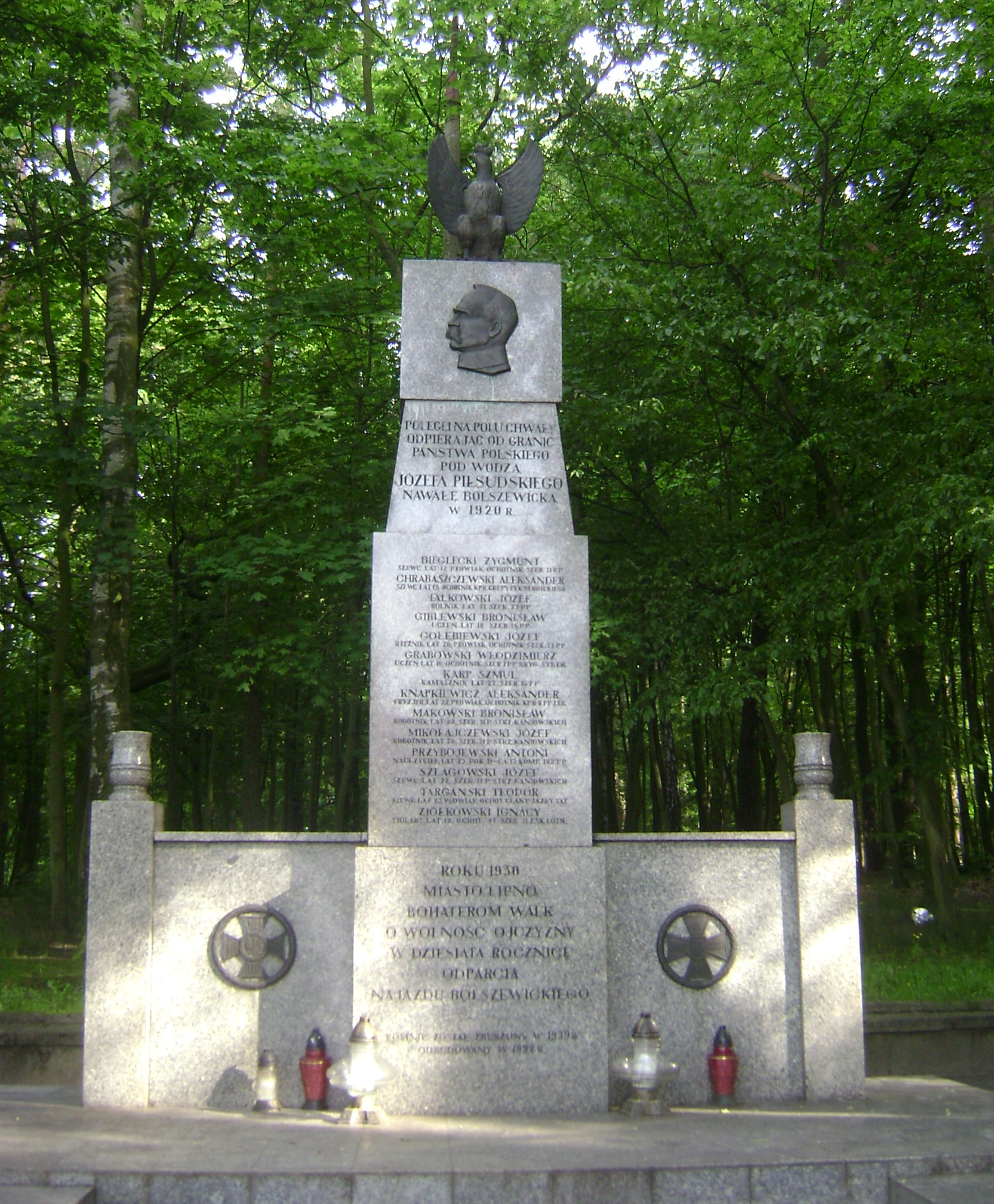
Memorial to Polish soldiers fallen in the Polish–Soviet War

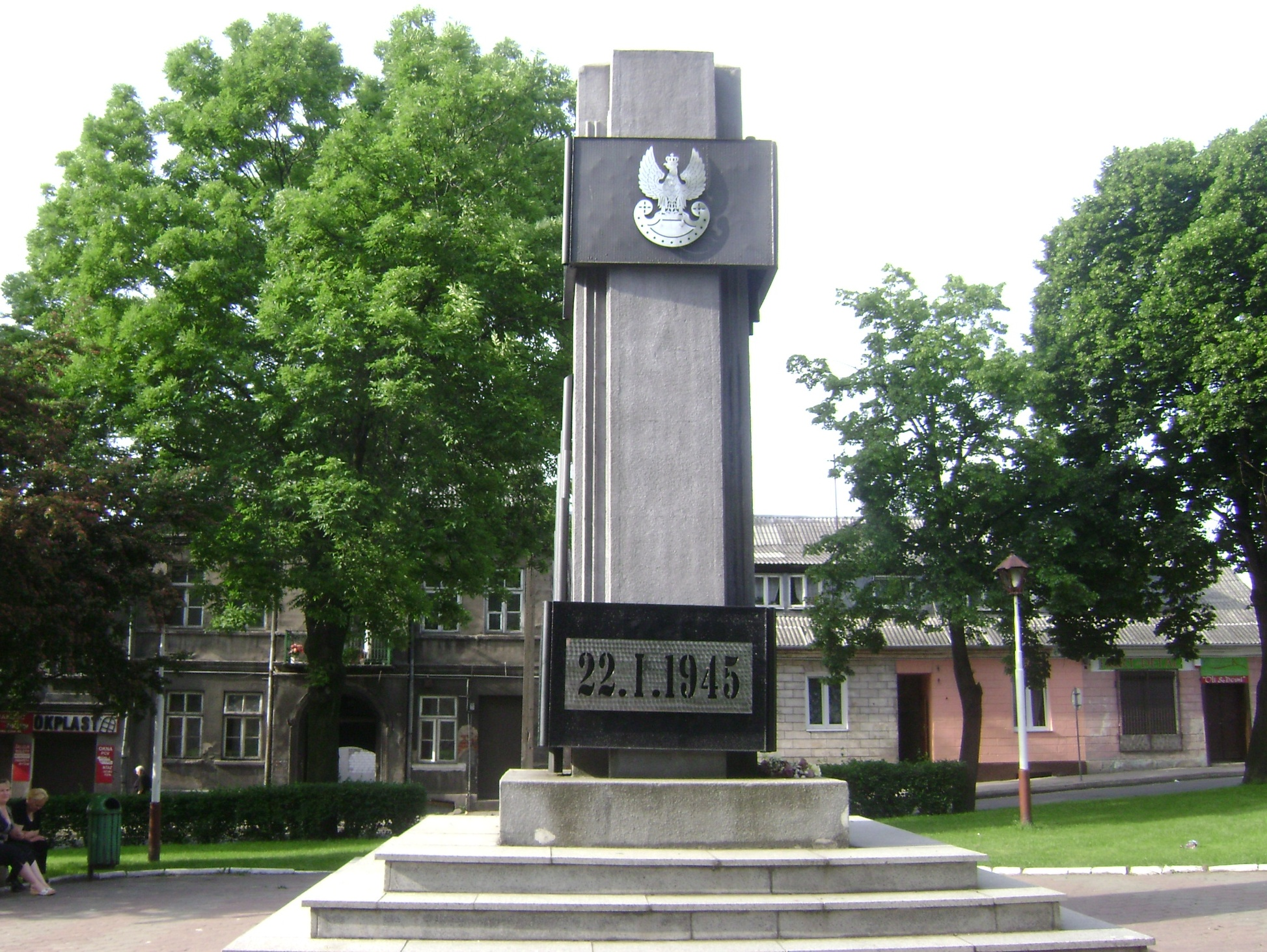
World War II memorial
