= Lipno County =

Lipno County Powiat lipnowski
- County
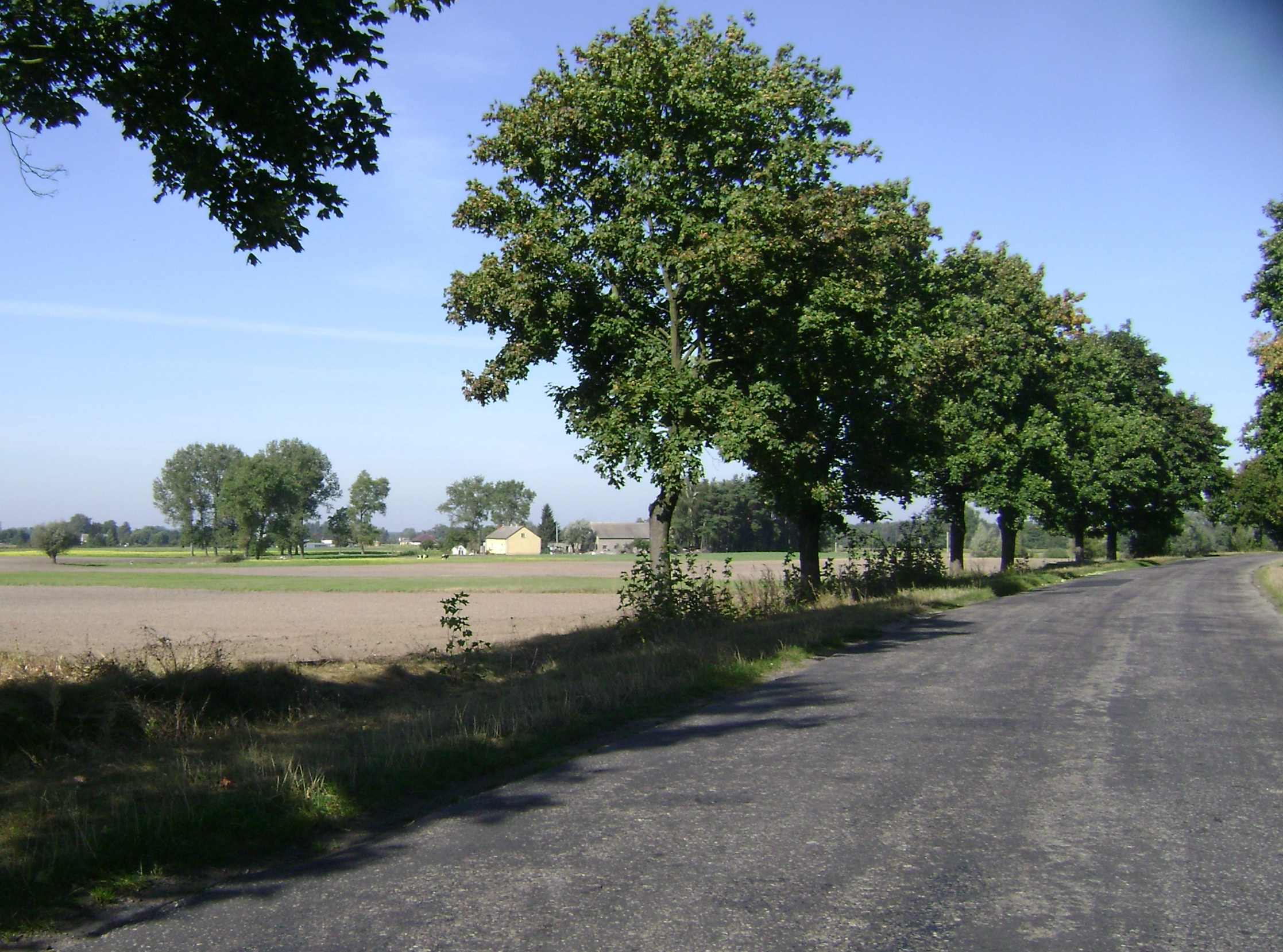

- Flag Coat of arms

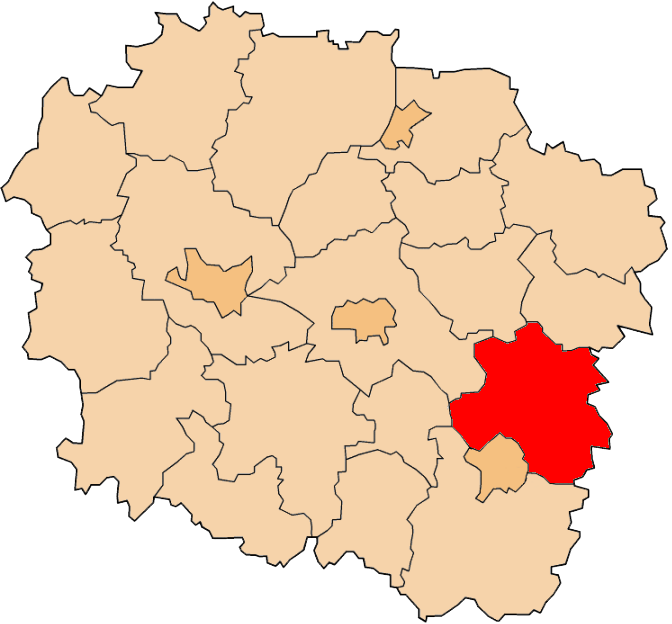
- Location within the voivodeship
- Coordinates (Lipno): 52°51′N 19°10′E
- Country: Poland
- Voivodeship: Kuyavian-Pomeranian
- Seat: Lipno
- Gminas: Total 9 (incl. 1 urban): Lipno; Gmina Bobrowniki; Gmina Chrostkowo; Gmina Dobrzyń nad Wisłą; Gmina Kikół; Gmina Lipno; Gmina Skępe; Gmina Tłuchowo; Gmina Wielgie

Area
  - Total: 1,015.6 km^{2} (392.1 sq mi)

Population (2019)
  - Total: 65,869
  - Density: 64.857/km^{2} (167.98/sq mi)
  - Urban: 20,146
  - Rural: 45,723
- Car plates: CLI
- Website: www.lipnowski.powiat.pl

Lipno County (Polish: powiat lipnowski) is a unit of territorial administration and local government (powiat) in Kuyavian-Pomeranian Voivodeship, north-central Poland. It was formed on January 1, 1999, as a result of the Polish local government reforms passed in 1998. Its administrative seat and largest town is Lipno, which lies 43 km (27 mi) south-east of Toruń and 84 km (52 mi) east of Bydgoszcz. The county also contains the towns of Skępe, lying 13 km (8 mi) east of Lipno, and Dobrzyń nad Wisłą, 26 km (16 mi) south-east of Lipno.

The county covers an area of 1,015.6 square kilometres (392.1 sq mi). As of 2019 its total population is 65,869, out of which the population of Lipno is 14,339, that of Skępe is 3,620, that of Dobrzyń nad Wisłą is 2,129, and the rural population is 45,723.

== Neighbouring counties ==
Lipno County is bordered by Golub-Dobrzyń County to the north, Rypin County to the north-east, Sierpc County to the east, Płock County to the south-east, the city of Włocławek and Włocławek County to the south, and Aleksandrów County and Toruń County to the west.

== Administrative divisions ==
The county is subdivided into nine gminas (one urban, two urban-rural and six rural). These are listed in the following table, in descending order of population.

Gmina	Type	Area (km^{2})	Population (2019)	Seat
Lipno	urban	11.0	14,399	
Gmina Lipno	rural	209.7	11,830	Lipno *
Gmina Dobrzyń nad Wisłą	urban-rural	115.4	7,638	Dobrzyń nad Wisłą
Gmina Skępe	urban-rural	179.2	7,550	Skępe
Gmina Kikół	rural	98.2	7,112	Kikół
Gmina Wielgie	rural	133.8	6,739	Wielgie
Gmina Tłuchowo	rural	98.7	4,655	Tłuchowo
Gmina Bobrowniki	rural	95.6	3,082	Bobrowniki
Gmina Chrostkowo	rural	74.1	2,864	Chrostkowo
* seat not part of the gmina
