= List of awards and honours received by Lech Wałęsa =

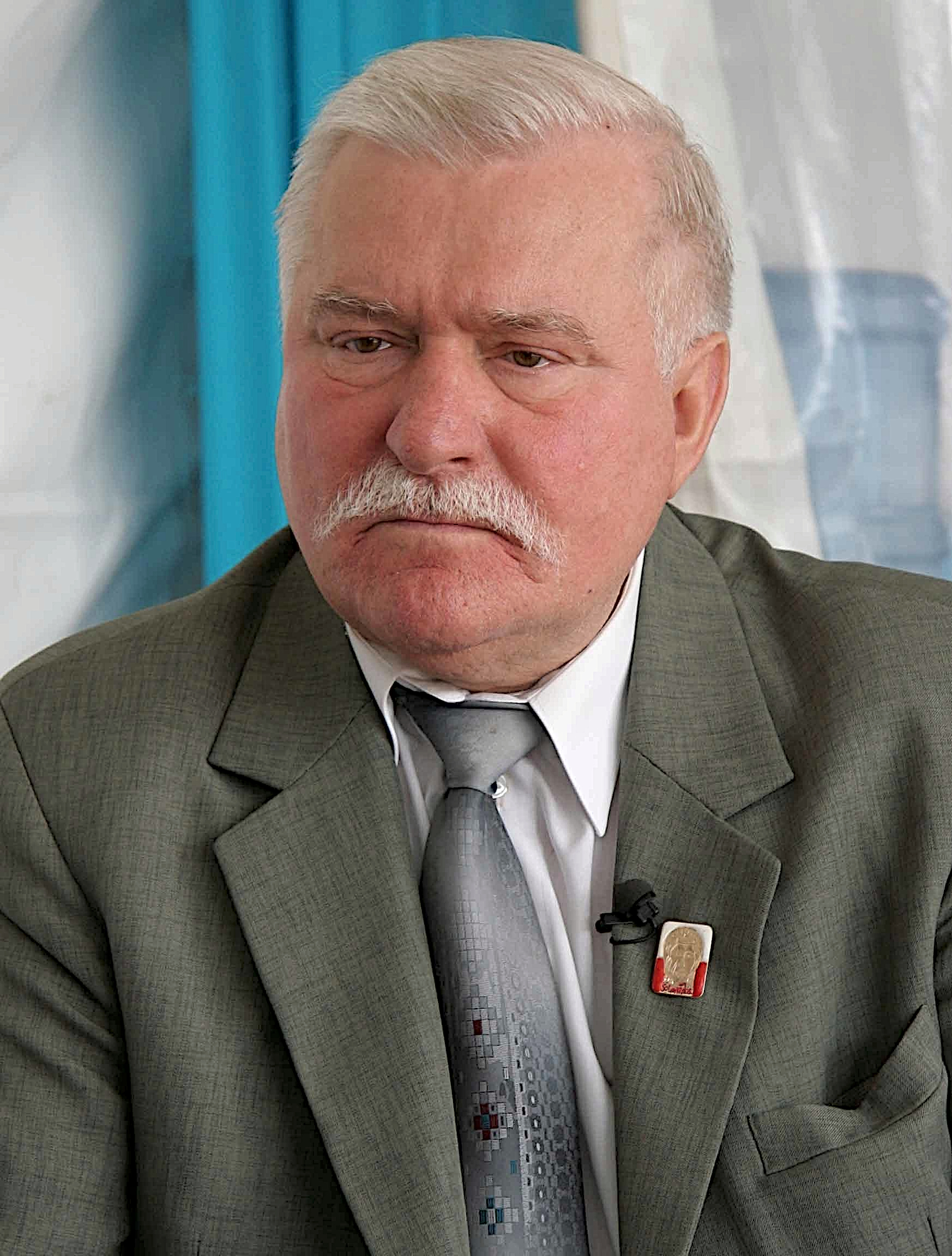
Wałęsa in 2009

Lech Wałęsa is a Polish statesman, former dissident, politician, trade-union organizer, and human-rights activist. He has received multiple awards and honors from national governments, universities, and other non-governmental organisations including the 1983 Nobel Peace Prize.

Wałęsa served as President of Poland from 1990 to 1995 and became the first democratically elected president of Poland since 1926 as well as the first-ever Polish president elected by popular vote. He was the leader of the Solidarity movement and led a successful pro-democratic effort, which in 1989 ended Communist rule in Poland and ushered in the end of the Cold War.

He was named the Time Person of the Year (1981) and one of Time's 100 most important people of the 20th century (1999). He has received over forty honorary degrees, including from Harvard University and Columbia University, as well as dozens of the highest state orders, including the Presidential Medal of Freedom, the Knight Grand Cross of the Order of the Bath, and the French Grand Cross of Legion of Honour. In 1989, Wałęsa was the first foreign non-head of state to address the Joint Meeting of the U.S. Congress. The Gdańsk Lech Wałęsa Airport has borne his name since 2004.

== Honors ==
Lech Wałęsa's coat of arms assigned by the Heraldic Authority of the Kingdom of Sweden on the occasion of his admittance into the Royal Order of the Seraphim. According to the intentions of the designer, Adam Heymowski, it refers to Polish national colors and the coat of arms of Gdańsk, of which one of the crosses was replaced by a fleur-de-lis, symbol of Our Lady of Częstochowa.

Apart from his 1983 Nobel Peace Prize, Wałęsa has received many other international distinctions and awards. He has been named "Man of the Year" by Time Magazine (1981), The Financial Times (1980) and The Observer (1980). He was the first recipient of the Liberty Medal, on 4 July 1989 in Philadelphia, Pennsylvania, and that same year received the Presidential Medal of Freedom. He is the third foreigner and the first non-head-of-state to have addressed a joint session of the United States Congress (15 November 1989).

On 8 February 2002, Wałęsa represented Europe, carrying the Olympic flag at the opening ceremonies of the XIX Olympic Winter Games in Salt Lake City, in company with Archbishop Desmond Tutu (Africa), John Glenn (the Americas), Kazuyoshi Funaki (Asia), Cathy Freeman (Oceania), Jean-Michel Cousteau (Environment), Jean-Claude Killy (Sport), and Steven Spielberg (Culture). Two years later, on 10 May 2004, Gdańsk International Airport was officially renamed Gdańsk Lech Wałęsa Airport to commemorate a famous Gdańsk citizen, and his signature was incorporated into the airport's logo.

A month later, in June 2004, Wałęsa represented Poland at the state funeral of Ronald Reagan. On 11 October 2006, Wałęsa was keynote speaker at the launch of "International Human Solidarity Day," proclaimed in 2005 by the United Nations General Assembly. In January 2007 Wałęsa spoke at a Taiwan event, "Towards a Global Forum on New Democracies," in support of peace and democracy, along with other prominent world leaders and Taiwan's President Chen Shui-bian.

On 25 April 2007, Wałęsa represented the Polish government at the funeral of Boris Yeltsin, former president of the Russian Federation. On 23 October 2009, he spoke at a conference in Gdansk of presidents of all European senates, commemorating the 20th anniversary of the first free parliamentary elections in a former communist country – the 1989 elections to the Polish Senate.

On 6 September 2011, Wałęsa rejected Lithuania's Order of Vytautas the Great as a result of constant discrimination on the part of the Lithuanian government towards its Polish minority.

== Orders ==
Ribbon bar	Award or decoration	Country	Date	Place	Note	Ref
	Knight Grand Cross of Order of Leopold I	Belgium	1991		One of the three Belgian national honorary Knight Orders. Highest Order of Belgium.	
	Order of the Southern Cross	Brazil	March 21, 1995		Brazil's highest order of merit.	
	Grand Cross of the Order of the Merit	Chile			Chilean order of merit.	
	Grand Cross of the Order of the White Lion	Czech Republic	1999		The highest order of the Czech Republic.	
	Knight of the Order of the Elephant	Denmark	July 5, 1993		The highest order of Denmark.	
	Grand Cross, Special Class of Order of Christopher Columbus	Dominican Republic	May 9, 2001		Order of the Dominican Republic, established in 1937.	
	Grand Cross of the Order of the Cross of Terra Mariana	Estonia	February 23, 2006	Kadriorg	Instituted in 1995 to honour the independence of the Estonian state.	
	Distinguished Member of the European Order of Merit	EU	May 19, 2026	Strasbourg	The highest class of this honour. Awarded to individuals recognised for their significant contributions to European integration or for promoting and defending the values established in the European Union treaties.	
	Grand Cross of the Order of the White Rose of Finland	Finland	1993		One of three highest state orders of Finland, established in 1919 by Carl Gustaf Emil Mannerheim.	
	Grand Cross of the Order of the Legion of Honour	France	1991		Highest decoration of France.	
	Grand Cross of the Order of Merit of the Federal Republic of Germany	Germany	2009	Berlin	Highest honour of West Germany (and modern Germany).	
	Grand Cross of the Order of Merit of the Italian Republic	Italy	February 6, 1991	Rome	The highest ranking honour of the Italian Republic.	
	Grand Order of Mugunghwa	South Korea	9 December 1994		The highest ranking honour of South Korea.	
	Star of Lithuania's Millennium	Lithuania	September 4, 2008		In recognition for his merits Lithuania. This order was founded in 2007 on the occasion of the thousandth anniversary of the first known written remark about Lithuania.	
	Order of the Netherlands Lion 1st Class	Netherlands	2008		Second-highest order of the Netherlands, founded by the first King of the Netherlands, William I.	
	Grand Cross of the Order of St. Olav	Norway	1995		Highest Norwegian order of chivalry.	
	Grand Cordon of the Royal and Hashemite Order of the Pearl	Philippines	February 2, 2013		Dynastic order of the Royal house of Sulu instituted by Sultan Muedzul Lail Tan Kiram and awarded at the 41st International Polonaise Ball.	
	Grand Cross of the Order of Polonia Restituta	Poland	December 23, 1992		(ex officio) One of Poland's highest orders.	
	Knight of Order of the White Eagle	Poland	December 23, 1992		(ex officio) Poland's highest decoration awarded to both civilians and the military for their merits.	
	Grand Collar of Order of Liberty	Portugal	August 18, 1993		A Portuguese honorific civil order that distinguishes relevant services to the cause of democracy and freedom, in the defense of the values of civilization and human dignification.	
	Grand Collar of Order of Prince Henry	Portugal	March 3, 1995		Portuguese National Order of knighthood.	
	Grand Cross of the Royal Order of Saint Michael of the Wing	Portugal	January 30, 2010	Miami	The oldest Portuguese order of knighthood, awarded by Prince Dom Miguel Duke of Viseu at the 38th International Polonaise Ball 2010.	
	Order of Saint James of the Sword	Portugal			Portuguese order of chivalry, founded in 1171.	
	Knight Grand Cross of the Royal Order of the Crown	(Romania) Romanian Royal Family	21 November 2014	Elisabeta Palace, Bucharest	Second highest ranking Romanian dynastic order of knighthood, granted and personally awarded by King Michael I of Romania for Lech's unparalleled contribution to the fall of communism in Europe.	
	Grand Cross of Order of Merit of the Hungarian Republic	Hungary	1994		Hungarian national order.	
	Order of Francisco de Miranda 1st Class	Republic of Venezuela	1989		Conferred by the Republic of Venezuela in memory of Francisco de Miranda.	
	Knight of the Royal Order of the Seraphim	Sweden	September 16, 1993		Swedish Royal order of chivalry, established by King Frederick I on 23 February 1748. Wałęsa received also his own Coat of arms.	
	First Class of the Order of the State of Republic of Turkey	Turkey	July 14, 1994		The highest national order awarded by President of Turkey.	
	Knight Grand Cross of the Most Honourable Order of the Bath	United Kingdom	1991		British order of chivalry.	
	Order of Prince Yaroslav the Wise 2nd Class	Ukraine	August 31, 2005			
	Presidential Medal of Freedom	United States	November 13, 1989	Washington	The highest civilian award in the U.S.	
	Medal of the Oriental Republic of Uruguay	Uruguay	23 February 1995	Montevideo	Medal awarded by the Uruguayan authorities to foreign personalities	
	Knight with the Collar of the Order of Pius IX	Vatican City	1991		A Papal Order of Knighthood founded on 17 June 1847 by Pope Pius IX.	
	Medal of Pope Pius XII	Vatican City	2008			

=== Awards ===
Award or decoration	Country	Date	Place	Note	Ref
European Human Rights Prize	France	11 May 1989	Strasbourg	Council of Europe's award in recognition of outstanding contributions to the cause of human rights as enshrined in the European Convention on Human Rights.	
Eisenhower Medallion	Germany	28 September 2007	Berlin	The highest award bestowed by People to People International.	
Ernst Reuter plaque	Germany	9 June 2009	Berlin	Berlin's highest honour.	
European Ulrich of Augsburg Prize	Germany	24 June 2011	Dillingen		
Freedom Award	Germany	8 November 2009	Berlin	honoured on behalf of the people of Poland at the Atlantic Council Freedom's Challenge	
Golden Hen	Germany	19 September 2012	Berlin		
International Democracy Award	Germany	November 1982	Berlin	Democracy Medal of International Association of Political Consultants. Wałęsa was its first recipient.	
World Tolerance Award	Germany	23 October 2003	Hamburg	International award for individuals for their achievements in a variety of areas.	
Medal of 65th Anniversary of End of World War II	Israel	22 December 2010	Warsaw	Awarded by Izraelski Związek Inwalidów i Uczestników Walki Zbrojnej z Nazizmem.	
Medal of 65th Anniversary of Warsaw Ghetto Uprising during World War II	Israel	22 December 2010	Warsaw	Awarded by Izraelski Związek Inwalidów i Uczestników Walki Zbrojnej z Nazizmem.	
Premio Galileo 2000	Italy	3 July 2007	Florence		
Legion of Liberty	Mexico	3 March 2009		Award of the Agora Institute of Strategic Thinking (IPEA).	
Award of Free World	Norway	1982			
Nobel Peace Prize	Norway	5 October 1983	Oslo	One of the five Nobel Prizes bequeathed by the Swedish industrialist and inventor Alfred Nobel. Wałęsa wasn't present; his acceptance was read by Mrs Danuta Wałęsa on 10 December 1983, in Oslo.	
Chair of Two Decades	Poland	26 February 2009	Warsaw	Award of The Warsaw Voice (Wałęsa shared it with Leszek Balcerowicz)	
Combatant Commemorative Cross "for the Victors"	Poland	22 December 2010	Warsaw	Awarded by Polish Society of War Veterans.	
Diamond of Freedom	Poland	25 September 2010	Świdnica		
Diploma of the Minister of Foreign Affairs	Poland	25 June 2004	Warsaw		
Euro-Atlantic Medal	Poland	27 April 2011	Warsaw		
Friend of Homeless People	Poland	17 July 1996		Decoration established by Marek Kotański.	
Haller Ring	Poland	10 February 1995	Puck	The highest award of the Maritime and Colonial League.	
Jan Karski Eagle Award	Poland	22 June 2011		Granted also to Mikhail Gorbachev, for changing Europe and the world. The award was established in April 2000 by Jan Karski to recognize humanitarian service to others, with a special connection to Poland.	
Jan Karski Freedom Award	Poland	23 January 2007	Warsaw	The award recognizes a Pole who has worked for the promotion of democracy and freedom. Wałęsa was its first recipient.	
Kisiel Prize	Poland	5 December 2005	Warsaw	Awarded for those whose actions most closely portray the spirit and beliefs of the Polish publicist and politician, Stefan Kisielewski.	
Komandoria Missio Reconciliationis	Poland	2013		Awarded by Ogólnopolskie Społeczne Stowarzyszenie "Misja Pojednania".	
Medal of Merit for NSZZ "Solidarnosc"	Poland	14 December 2005	Gdańsk	first recipient	
Medal of the President of the Association of Polish Electrical Engineers	Poland	8 April 2011	Gdańsk		
Person of Merit for Warmia and Masuria	Poland	23 August 2008			
Pigeon statuette	Poland	12 May 2008	Gdańsk	Funded on the 60th anniversary of adopting the Universal Declaration of Human Rights by the UNGA. Received on account of his contributions to human rights issues from Jerzy Buzek. Passed to Stanisław Szuszkiewicz on 12 May 2008.	
Princess Łyna statuette	Poland	25 June 2010	Olsztynek		
Pro Fide et Patria Medal	Poland	1985	Jasna Góra		
Super Wektor 2006	Poland	12 March 2007	Warsaw	Award granted by Employers of Poland.	
Victoria International Humanitarian Award	Poland	11 May 2003	Świdnica		
One of 15 Champions of World Democracy	Slovenia	19 January 2008	Ljubljana	Award granted by the Europe-based magazine A Different View.	
Let Live Award	Sweden	17 May 1981	Malmö		
1978 Orbis Guaraniticus Medal	UNESCO				
Democracy Service Medal	United States	April 1999	Washington	Lech Wałęsa and Lane Kirkland were its first recipients.	
Distinction in International Law and Affairs Award	United States	1991		New York State Bar Association's award to honor outstanding efforts in the area of international law and affairs.	
Dole Leadership Prize	United States	22 September 2005	Lawrence	Awarded to an individual or group whose public service inspires others.	
George Meany Human Rights Award	United States	14 November 1989	Washington	Award was first intended for Solidarnosc in 1981, but Wałęsa wasn't allowed by Polish authorities to claim that prize.	
George Washington Honor Medal	United States	1983		The highest civilian honor of Freedoms Foundation at Valley Forge.	
Gold Medal of The American Institute of Polish Culture	United States	1991	Miami	Awarded to Wałęsa "for launching an avalanche of freedom".	
Integrity Award	United States	24 October 1986	Los Angeles	Transparency International's humanitarian award. Polish authorities refused to give Lech Wałęsa a passport for a trip to the United States, where he was to receive it.	
International Freedom Award	United States	1999	Memphis		
Lincoln Leadership Prize	United States	9 February 2012	Springfield	Distinction of Abraham Lincoln Presidential Library conferred on people whose "lives and actions exemplify Lincoln's legacy of leadership".	
Medal of Merit	United States	1981		Medal of Polish American Congress.	
Pacem in Terris Award	United States	2001	Davenport	Created in 1964 by the Davenport Catholic Interracial Council, to honor a person for their achievements in peace and justice in the world.	
Philadelphia Liberty Medal	United States	4 July 1989		National Constitution Center's award to recognize leadership in the pursuit of freedom. Wałęsa was first recipient, accepted by Danuta Wałęsa on his behalf.	
Ronald Reagan Freedom Award	United States	24 May 2011	Washington	The highest civilian honor bestowed by the private Ronald Reagan Presidential Foundation.	
Sam Houston Humanitarian Award	United States	15 October 1996	Huntsville	Created in 1993 in honor of the 200th anniversary of the birth of American statesman and Texas hero Sam Houston, awarded "for his outstanding achievements against incredible odds".	
Social Justice Award	United States	26 May 1983		One of the highest honors of the United Auto Workers.	
Spirit of Humanity Award	United States	3 May 2006	Washington	Award for Individual Achievement	
The Path to Peace Award	United States	1996	New York City	Bestowed on individuals whose life and work have dramatically affected the world community for the better	
Humanitarian Public Service Medal		1984			
Love International Award		1981			

== Man of the Year prizes ==
Man of the Year	By	Location	Date	Notes	Ref
1980	The Financial Times	United Kingdom			
1980	The Observer	United Kingdom			
1980	Die Welt	Germany			
1981	Die Zeit	Germany			
1981	L'Express	France			
1981	Le Soir	Brussels, Belgium			
1981	TIME Magazine	United States	4 January 1982	Time Person of the Year	
1981	Le Point	France			
1989	Polish Radio and Television	Poland			
1989	Saudi Gazette	Saudi Arabia			
1989	The Warsaw Voice	Poland			
1989	El Periodico	Barcelona, Spain			
1995	Wprost	Warsaw, Poland	3 January 1996		
2001	Federacja Regionalnych Związków Gmin i Powiatów RP	Poland			
2004	XV Economic Forum in Krynica	Krynica-Zdrój, Poland	7 September 2005		
2012	Tłuchowo	Tłuchowo, Poland	20 January 2013		

== Honorary ==
=== Honorary doctorates ===
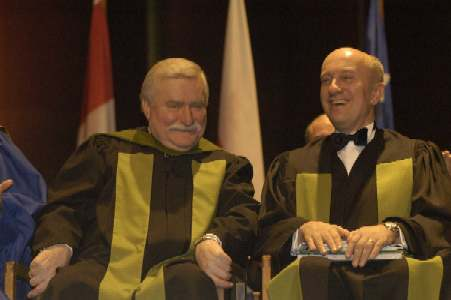
Lech Wałęsa (left) receives honorary doctorate from Université du Québec à Trois-Rivières, November 2005

Wałęsa has been awarded over 100 honorary doctorates by universities around the world.

Institution	Degree	Location	Date	Notes	Ref
Universidad de Mendoza		Mendoza, Argentina	1997		
Universidad del Salvador		Buenos Aires, Argentina	1997		
Katholieke Universiteit Leuven		Leuven, Belgium	1981		
McMaster University	LL.D.	Hamilton, Ontario, Canada	November 1989		
Simon Fraser University		Burnaby, Canada	1989		
Université du Québec à Trois-Rivières		Trois-Rivières, Quebec, Canada	28 November 2005	"in recognition of his exceptional life, involvement and participation in the development of democracy"	
University of Chile		Santiago, Chile	1995		
Pontificia Universidad Católica Madre y Maestra		Santiago de los Caballeros, Dominican Republic	2001		
London Metropolitan University	Doctor of Philosophy	London, England	8 December 2009	"in recognition of his outstanding contribution to international relations in Europe and the wider world"	
Alliance College		Paris, France	1981	in absentia	
St. Senis University		Paris, France	1982		
University of Paris		Paris, France	1983		
University of Hawaii at Manoa		(United States) Honolulu, Hawaii	1999		
Meiji University		Tokyo, Japan	1997		
Universidad Anáhuac del Sur		Mexico City, Mexico	1996		
University of Lima		Lima, Peru	21 June 2007		
Nicolaus Copernicus University in Toruń		Toruń, Poland	1 October 1990		
Opole University		Opole, Poland	10 March 2011		
University of Gdańsk		Gdańsk, Poland	20 March 1990	"in recognition of his undying achievements in developing and propagating the ideas of freedom and democracy, the rebirth of humanist values, the dignity and rights of man, and the community and the nation"	
Korea University	hon. prof.	Seoul, South Korea	1997		
European University of Madrid		Madrid, Spain	28 January 2011	"in recognition of his defense of independent unionism and for becoming Poland's first democratic president after the fall of communism"	
University of Dundee	Doctor of Laws	Dundee, Scotland, UK	13 July 1984		
Central Connecticut State University	Doctor of Humane Letters	Hartford, Connecticut, United States	10 April 1996	Commencement at CCSU	
Columbia University		(United States) New York City, USA	1981		
Fordham University	Doctor of Laws	(United States) New York City, USA	20 May 1984	in absentia	
Gannon University		(United States) Erie, Pennsylvania	1999		
Harvard University		Cambridge, Massachusetts, United States	14 April 1983	Never actually received	
Lawrence University	Doctor of Laws	Appleton, Wisconsin, United States	15 October 2001	"in recognition of his democratic efforts both in his homeland and worldwide"	
Lewis & Clark College		Portland, Oregon, United States	2000		
Lewis & Clark College	Doctorate of Humane Letters	Portland, Oregon, United States	6 May 2001		
Lynn University		(United States) Florida, USA	11 December 1998		
MacMurray College		Jacksonville, Illinois, United States	1982		
Marquette University	Doctor of Laws	Milwaukee, Wisconsin, United States	2 March 2004		
Middlebury College	Doctor of Letters	Middlebury, Vermont, United States	21 May 2000		
Nasson College	Doctor of Laws	Springvale, Maine, United States	7 June 1982	in absentia	
National University of Kyiv-Mohyla Academy		Kyiv, Ukraine	26 March 2026		
New England College		Henniker, New Hampshire, United States	14 May 2022		
Providence College		Providence, Rhode Island, United States	1981		
Ramapo College		Mahwah, New Jersey, United States	3 October 2001	presented a public lecture: Democracy: The Never Ending Battle.	
Saint Ambrose University	Doctor of Humanities	Davenport, Iowa, United States	14 May 2001		
Seton Hall University	Doctor of Laws	South Orange, New Jersey, United States	1982	received on 2 December 2005, from Kurt Borowsky	
Springfield College	Doctor of Humanics	Springfield, Massachusetts, United States	1982		
University of North Carolina at Charlotte	Doctor of Laws	Charlotte, North Carolina, United States	14 December 2002		
University of Notre Dame		Notre Dame, United States	May 1982	in absentia	
University of Oregon		Eugene, Oregon, United States	2001		
University of West Florida	Doctor of Public Service	(United States) Pensacola, Florida, U.S.	31 March 2006		
University of Santo Tomas	Honorary Professor	Manila, Philippines	26 November 2012	"Whereas, you were awarded the Nobel Peace Prize in 1983 for your struggles and ideals, as a trade union leader and organizer, advocating non-violent human right activism against a communist regime [...] You are man of the people, who regarded the Catholic faith as a source of strength and inspiration, and the courage and moral vision of a hero of Polish independence." Gave a lecture entitled "The Role of Faith on the Struggle for Freedom and Democracy"	
Westminster College		Fulton, Missouri, United States	1998		

=== Honorary citizenship ===
City / Region	Country	Date	Notes	Ref
Turin	Italy	1982	received on 22 October 2000	
Reggio nell'Emilia	Italy	1984	conferred on 5 July 1984	Reference
Osaka	Japan			
Białystok	Poland	1990		
Borne Sulinowo	Poland			
Brzeg Dolny	Poland	23 June 2005		
Będzin	Poland			
Darłowo	Poland	3 March 2010		
Elbląg	Poland	27 October 2011		
Gdańsk	Poland	24 April 1997		
Gdynia	Poland	20 December 1995		
Kościerzyna	Poland	6 June 2005		
Kraków	Poland	24 August 1990		
Kuyavian-Pomeranian Voivodeship	Poland	19 October 2010	received in Toruń	
Łęczyca	Poland	June 2004		
Łuków	Poland	10 November 1995		
Mielec	Poland	31 October 1990		
Mława	Poland	16 November 2009		
Opole	Poland	2009	received on 11 October 2010	
Poznań	Poland	18 November 2009		
Puławy	Poland	3 June 2009	accepted by Henryk Wujec from Workers' Defence Committee (KOR) on Wałęsa's behalf	
Radom	Poland	1990		
Sopot	Poland	21 December 1995		
Szczecin	Poland	8 September 2008	received on 20 April 2009	
Terespol	Poland	22 August 2009		
Ustrzyki Dolne	Poland	10 July 2010		
Warsaw	Poland	24 May 2007	received on 31 July 2007	
Wrocław	Poland	24 June 2005		
Zamość	Poland	19 November 1990		
Zielona Góra	Poland	August 2008	received on 10 September 2010	
London	United Kingdom	1991		
Buffalo	United States			

=== Other ===
Honor / award	Location	Date	Notes	Ref
Honorary fellowship of Liverpool John Moores University	Liverpool, United Kingdom	16 May 2006		
Honorary Brovarnia Beer Mug of Hotel Gdansk	Gdańsk, Poland	December 2008		
Friend of Scouting in Europe (FOSE) of European Scout Foundation	Chelmsford, United Kingdom	3 August 2007		
Honorary ITKF Black Belt	Stara Wieś, Poland	10 October 2009		

== Places named after Lech Wałęsa ==
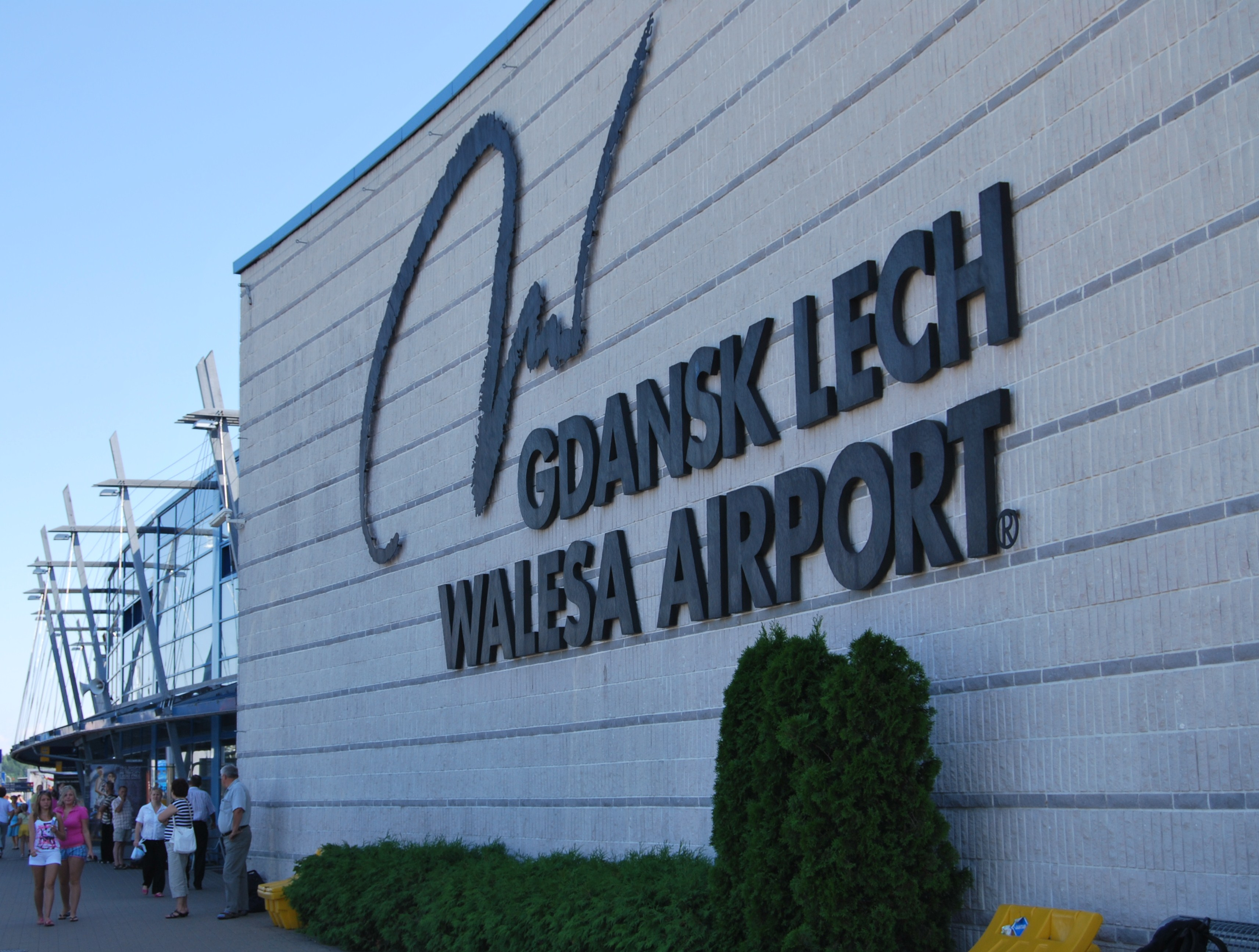
Gdańsk Lech Wałęsa Airport (2009)

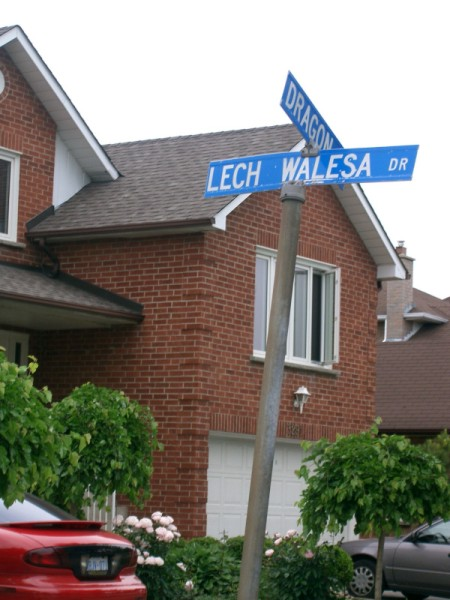
Lech Walesa Drive in Mississauga (2004)

=== Buildings ===
Place	Location	Date	Note	Ref
Gdańsk Lech Wałęsa Airport	Gdańsk, Poland	10 May 2004		
Conference Centre – Niepołomice Castle	Niepołomice, Poland	10 April 2008		
Lech Walesa Hall at Northeastern Illinois University	Chicago, United States	29 May 2009		

=== Schools ===
School	Location	Date	Note	Ref
All Saints Catholic School	Toronto, Canada			
Publiczne Gimnazjum w Chalinie	Chalin, Poland	31 August 2006		
Zespół Szkół w Kowalewie Pomorskim	Kowalewo Pomorskie, Poland	14 October 2008		
Gimnazjum Nr 1	Reda, Poland	11 October 2008		
Szkoła Podstawowa Nr 3	Stryszawa, Poland	26 October 1996		

=== Streets ===
School	Location	Date	Note	Ref
Lech Walesa Drive	Mississauga, Canada			
Rue Lech Walesa	Arras, France	2007		
Rue Lech Walesa	Le Kremlin-Bicêtre, France			
Allée Lech Walesa	Lognes, France			
Boulevard Lech Walesa	Nice, France			
Avenue Lech Walesa	Rosny sous Bois France			
Ulica Lecha Wałęsy	Zgorzałe, Poland	21 December 2009		
Lech Walesas Gata	Kalmar, Sweden			
Lech Walesa Street	San Francisco, United States			
