= Lech Wałęsa =

President of Poland from 1990 to 1995

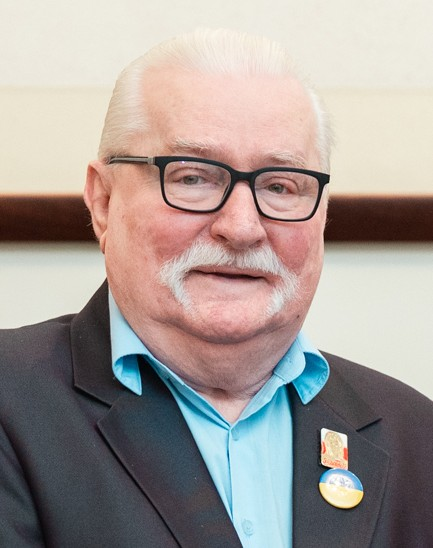
- Wałęsa in 2026

President of Poland
- In office 22 December 1990 – 22 December 1995
- Prime Minister: Tadeusz Mazowiecki; Jan Krzysztof Bielecki; Jan Olszewski; Waldemar Pawlak (caretaker); Hanna Suchocka; Waldemar Pawlak; Józef Oleksy
- Preceded by: Wojciech Jaruzelski (in country); Ryszard Kaczorowski (as the last President-in-exile)
- Succeeded by: Aleksander Kwaśniewski

Chairman of Christian Democracy of the Third Polish Republic
- In office 1997–2001
- Preceded by: Position established
- Succeeded by: Position abolished

Chairman of Nonpartisan Bloc for Support of Reforms
- In office 30 November 1993 – November 1997
- Preceded by: Position established
- Succeeded by: Position abolished

Chairman of Solidarity
- In office 17 September 1980 – 23 February 1991 (Note: Underground from 13 December 1981 to 17 April 1989.)
- Preceded by: Union established
- Succeeded by: Marian Krzaklewski

Personal details
- Born: 29 September 1943 (age 83) Popowo, Danzig-West Prussia, Nazi-occupied Poland
- Party: Civic Coalition (since 2025) (Affiliated non-Member)
- Other political affiliations: Civic Platform (2016-2025) (Affiliated non-Member); Christian Democracy of the Third Polish Republic (1997–2001); Solidarity Electoral Action (1997–2001); Nonpartisan Bloc for Support of Reforms (1993–1997); Solidarity Citizens' Committee (1988–1993); Solidarity (1980–1988)
- Spouse: Mirosława Danuta Gołoś (m. 1969)
- Children: 8, including Jarosław
- Occupation: Electrician
- Awards: Full list
- Lech Wałęsa's voice Wałęsa following the signing of the Gdańsk Agreement; Recorded 31 August 1980

Lech Wałęsa (Note: English: /vəˈwɛnsə/ və-WEN-sə, Polish: [ˈlɛɣ vaˈwɛ̃sa]; spelling sometimes simplified as Walesa in English-language sources and media.) (born 29 September 1943) is a Polish statesman, anti-communist dissident and Nobel Peace Prize laureate who served as the president of Poland between 1990 and 1995. After winning the 1990 election, Wałęsa became the first democratically elected president of Poland since 1922 and the first-ever Polish president elected by popular vote. An electrician by trade, Wałęsa became the leader of the opposition Solidarity movement and led a successful pro-democratic effort, which in 1989 ended Communist rule in Poland and ushered in the end of the Cold War.

While working at the Lenin Shipyard (now Gdańsk Shipyard), Wałęsa, an electrician, became a trade-union activist, for which he was persecuted by the government, placed under surveillance, fired in 1976 and arrested several times. In August 1980, he was instrumental in political negotiations that led to the ground-breaking Gdańsk Agreement between striking workers and the government. He co-founded the Solidarity trade union, whose membership rose to more than ten million.

After martial law in Poland was imposed and Solidarity was outlawed, Wałęsa was arrested again. Released from custody, he continued his activism and was prominent in the establishment of the Round Table Agreement that led to the semi-free 1989 Polish parliamentary election and a Solidarity-led government. He presided over Poland's transition from Marxist–Leninist state socialism into a market-based liberal democracy, but his active role in Polish politics diminished after he narrowly lost the 1995 Polish presidential election. In 1995, he established the Lech Wałęsa Institute.

Since 1980, Wałęsa has received hundreds of prizes, honors and awards from multiple countries and organisations worldwide. He was named the Time Man of the Year (1981) and one of Time's 100 most important people of the 20th century (1999). In 1983, he was awarded the Nobel Peace Prize, which was received by his wife, as he worried the authorities would not let him return. He has received more than forty honorary degrees, including from Harvard University, Fordham University and Columbia University, as well as dozens of high state orders, including being awarded the Presidential Medal of Freedom, and being appointed a Knight Grand Cross of the Order of the Bath, and a Grand Cross of the Legion of Honour. In 1989, Wałęsa was the first foreign non-head of state to address the Joint Meeting of the U.S. Congress. The Gdańsk Lech Wałęsa Airport has borne his name since 2004.

== Early life ==
Lech (Note: His given name, Lech, was the name of the legendary founder of Poland.) Wałęsa was born in Popowo, in the present-day Lipno County of Kuyavian-Pomeranian Voivodeship, then under Nazi German occupation as part of Landkreis Leipe in Reichsgau Danzig-West Prussia. His father, Bolesław Wałęsa (1909–1945), was a carpenter who was rounded up and interned in a forced labour camp at Młyniec (outpost of KL Stutthof) by the German occupying forces before Lech was born. (Note: The German airfield Danzig-Langfuhr in Wrzeszcz-Gdańsk was located on the site of the former villages Młyniec and Zaspa (now neighborhoods of Gdańsk) and was serviced by prisoners of KL Stutthof forming the Außenkommando KL Stutthof – Danzig-Langfuhr. The airfield was heavily bombed by the Allies in 1945, but remained in use until 1974 Lotnisko Gdańsk-Wrzeszcz.) Bolesław returned home after the war but died two months later from exhaustion and illness. Lech's mother, Feliksa Wałęsa (née Kamieńska; 1915–1976), has been credited with shaping her son's beliefs and tenacity. After Bolesław's death, Feliksa remarried her brother-in-law, Stanisław Wałęsa (1917–1981), a farmer. Lech had three elder full siblings; Izabela (1935–2012), (Note: Izabela Młyńska, after marriage) Edward (1937–1999) and Stanisław (1940–2001); and three younger half-brothers; Tadeusz (born 1945), Zygmunt (born 1948) and Wojciech (1950–1988). In 1973, Lech's mother and stepfather emigrated to the US for economic reasons. They lived in Jersey City, New Jersey, where Feliksa died in a car accident in 1976 and Stanisław died of a heart attack in 1981. Both of them were buried in Poland.

In 1961, Lech graduated from primary and vocational school in nearby Chalin and Lipno as a qualified electrician. He worked as a car mechanic from 1962 to 1964, and then embarked on his two-year, obligatory military service, attaining the rank of corporal before beginning work on 12 July 1967 as an electrician at Lenin Shipyard (Stocznia Gdańska im. Lenina), now called Gdańsk Shipyard (Stocznia Gdańska) in Gdańsk.

== Solidarity movement ==
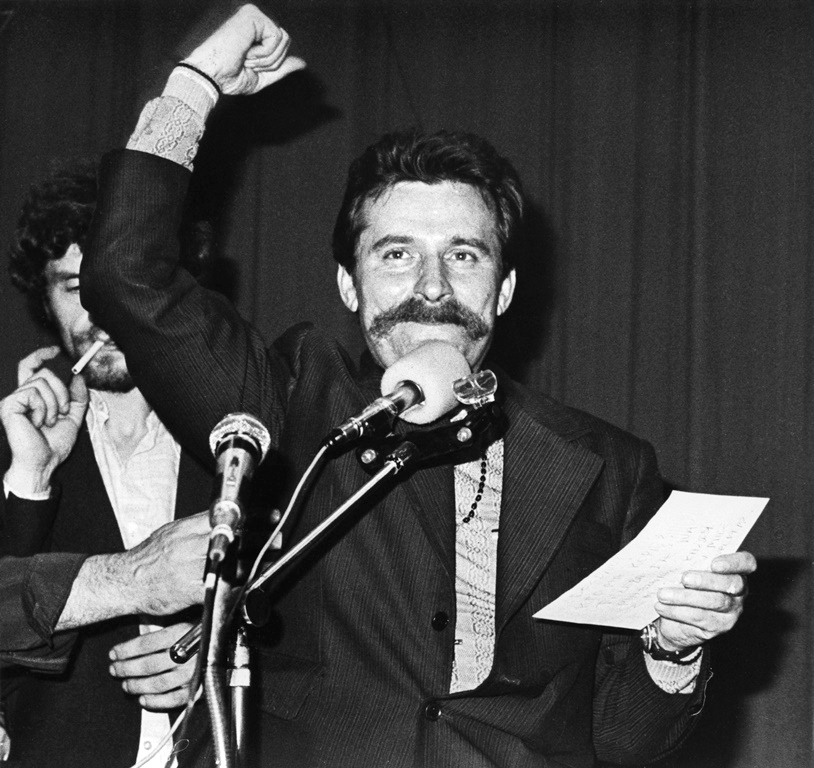
Wałęsa during the strike at the Lenin Shipyard, August 1980

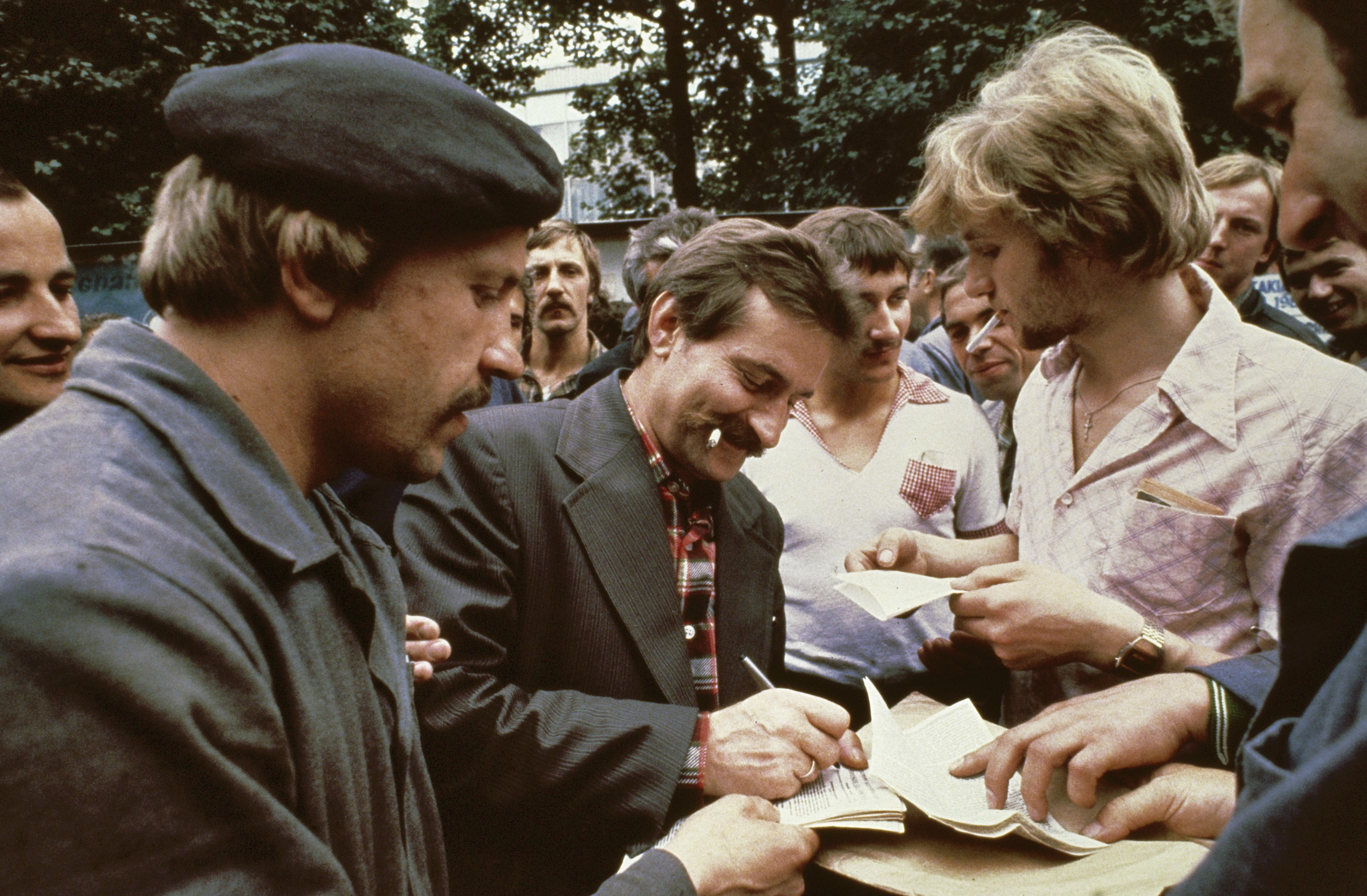
Wałęsa signs autographs during the strike in August 1980.

From early in his career, Wałęsa was interested in workers' concerns; in 1968 he encouraged shipyard colleagues to boycott official rallies that condemned recent student strikes. He was a charismatic leader, who helped organise the illegal 1970 protests at the Gdańsk Shipyard when workers protested at the government's decree raising food prices and he was considered for the position of chairman of the strike committee. The strikes' outcome, which involved the deaths of more than 30 workers, galvanised Wałęsa's views on the need for change. In June 1976, Wałęsa lost his job at the Gdańsk Shipyard because of his continued involvement in illegal unions, strikes, and a campaign to commemorate the victims of the 1970 protests. Afterwards, he worked as an electrician for several other companies but his activism led to him continually being laid off and he was jobless for long periods. Wałęsa and his family were under constant surveillance by the Polish secret police; his home and workplace were always bugged. Over the next few years, he was arrested several times for participating in dissident activities.

Wałęsa worked closely with the Workers' Defence Committee (KOR), a group that emerged to lend aid to people arrested after the 1976 labor strikes and to their families. In June 1978, he became an activist of the underground Free Trade Unions of the Coast (Wolne Związki Zawodowe Wybrzeża). On 14 August 1980, another rise in food prices led to a strike at the Lenin Shipyard in Gdańsk, of which Wałęsa was one of the instigators. Wałęsa climbed over the shipyard fence and quickly became one of the strike leaders. The strike inspired other similar strikes in Gdańsk, which then spread across Poland. Wałęsa headed the Inter-Enterprise Strike Committee, coordinating the workers at Gdańsk and at 20 other plants in the region. On 31 August, the government, represented by Mieczysław Jagielski, signed an accord (the Gdańsk Agreement) with the Strike Coordinating Committee. Wałęsa used an oversized pen to sign the agreement, which was shown on television networks worldwide. The agreement granted the Lenin Shipyard workers the right to strike and permitted them to form an independent trade union. The Strike Coordinating Committee legalised itself as the National Coordinating Committee of the Solidarność (Solidarity) Free Trade Union, and Wałęsa was chosen as chairman of the committee. The Solidarity trade union quickly grew, ultimately claiming more than 10 million members – more than a quarter of Poland's population. Wałęsa's role in the strike, in the negotiations, and in the newly formed independent trade union gained him fame on the international stage.

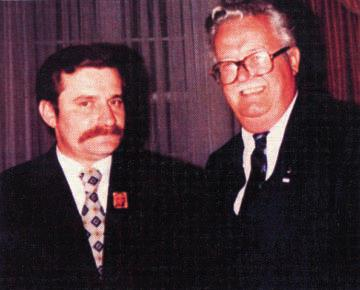
Wałęsa with Alojzy Mazewski in January 1981

On 10 March 1981, through the introduction of his former superior in the army, Wałęsa met Wojciech Jaruzelski for the first time in the office building of the Council of Ministers for three hours. During the meeting, Jaruzelski and Wałęsa agreed that mutual trust was necessary if the problems of Poland were to be solved. Wałęsa said, "It's not the case that the name of socialism is bad. Only some people spoiled the name of socialism". He also complained about and criticised the government. Jaruzelski informed Wałęsa of the coming war games of the Warsaw Pact from 16 to 25 March, hoping he could help maintain the social order and avoid anti-Soviet remarks. Jaruzelski also reminded Wałęsa that Solidarity had used foreign funds. Wałęsa joked, "We don't have to take only dollars. We can take corn, fertiliser, anything is okay. I told Mr. Kania before that, I would take everything from the enemy. The more the better, until the enemy was weakened no more".

Wałęsa held his position until 13 December 1981, when General Jaruzelski declared martial law in Poland. Wałęsa and many other Solidarity leaders and activists were arrested; he was incarcerated for 11 months until 14 November 1982 at Chylice, Otwock, and Arłamów; eastern towns near the Soviet border. On 8 October 1982, Solidarity was outlawed. In 1983, Wałęsa applied to return to the Gdańsk Shipyard as an electrician. The same year, he was awarded the Nobel Peace Prize. He was unable to accept it himself, fearing Poland's government would not let him back into the country. His wife Danuta accepted the prize on his behalf.

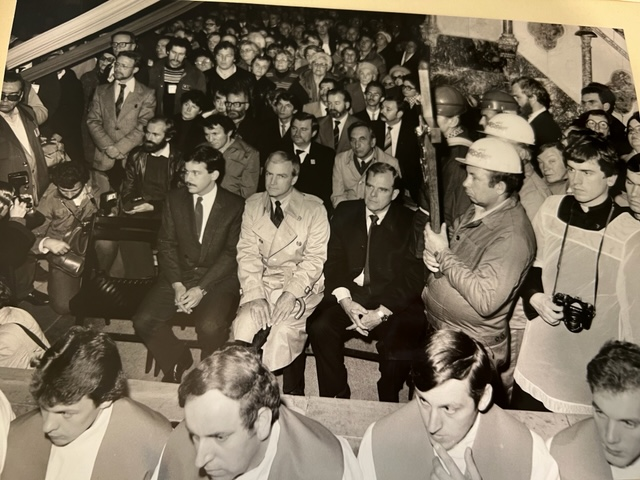
Solidarity leaders Lech Walesa and Tadeusz Mazowiecki at memorial mass on first anniversary of Father Popieluszko's death, October 1985.

Through the mid-1980s, Wałęsa continued underground Solidarity-related activities. Every issue of the leading underground weekly publication Tygodnik Mazowsze bore his motto, "Solidarity will not be divided or destroyed". Following a 1986 amnesty for Solidarity activists, Wałęsa co-founded the Provisional Council of NSZZ Solidarity (Tymczasowa Rada NSZZ Solidarność), the first overt legal Solidarity entity since the declaration of martial law. From 1987 to 1990, he organized and led the semi-illegal Provisional Executive Committee of the Solidarity Trade Union. In mid-1988, he instigated work-stoppage strikes at the Gdańsk Shipyard. He was frequently hauled in for interrogations by the Polish secret police, the Security Service, during the 1980s. On many of these occasions, Danuta – who was even more anti-Communist than her husband – was known to openly taunt Security Service agents when they picked Lech up.

After months of strikes and political deliberations, at the conclusion of the 10th plenary session of the Polish United Workers' Party (PZPR, the Polish Communist party), the government agreed to enter into Round Table Negotiations that lasted from February to April 1989. Wałęsa was an informal leader of the non-governmental side in the negotiations. During the talks, he traveled throughout Poland giving speeches in support of the negotiations. At the end of the talks, the government signed an agreement to re-establish the Solidarity Trade Union and to organise semi-free elections to the Polish parliament; in accordance with the Round Table Agreement, only members of the Communist party and its allies could stand for 65 percent of the seats in the lower house, the Sejm.

In December 1988, Wałęsa co-founded the Solidarity Citizens' Committee; this was ostensibly an advisory body but in practice a political party that won the parliamentary elections in June 1989. Solidarity took all the seats in the Sejm that were subject to free elections, and all but one seat in the newly re-established Senate. Wałęsa was one of Solidarity's most public figures; he was an active campaigner, appearing on many campaign posters, but did not run for parliament himself. Solidarity winners in the Sejm elections were referred to as "Wałęsa's team" or "Lech's team" because they had all appeared on their election posters with Wałęsa.

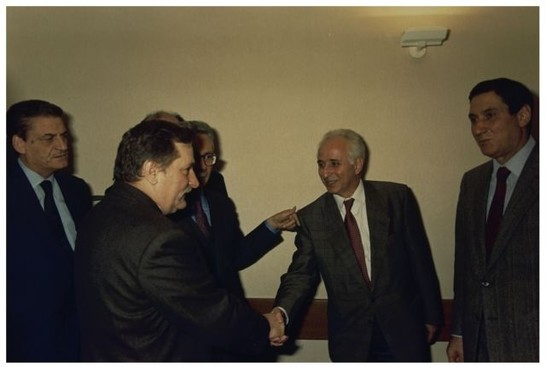
Wałęsa meeting with Christian democratic European politicians, April 1989

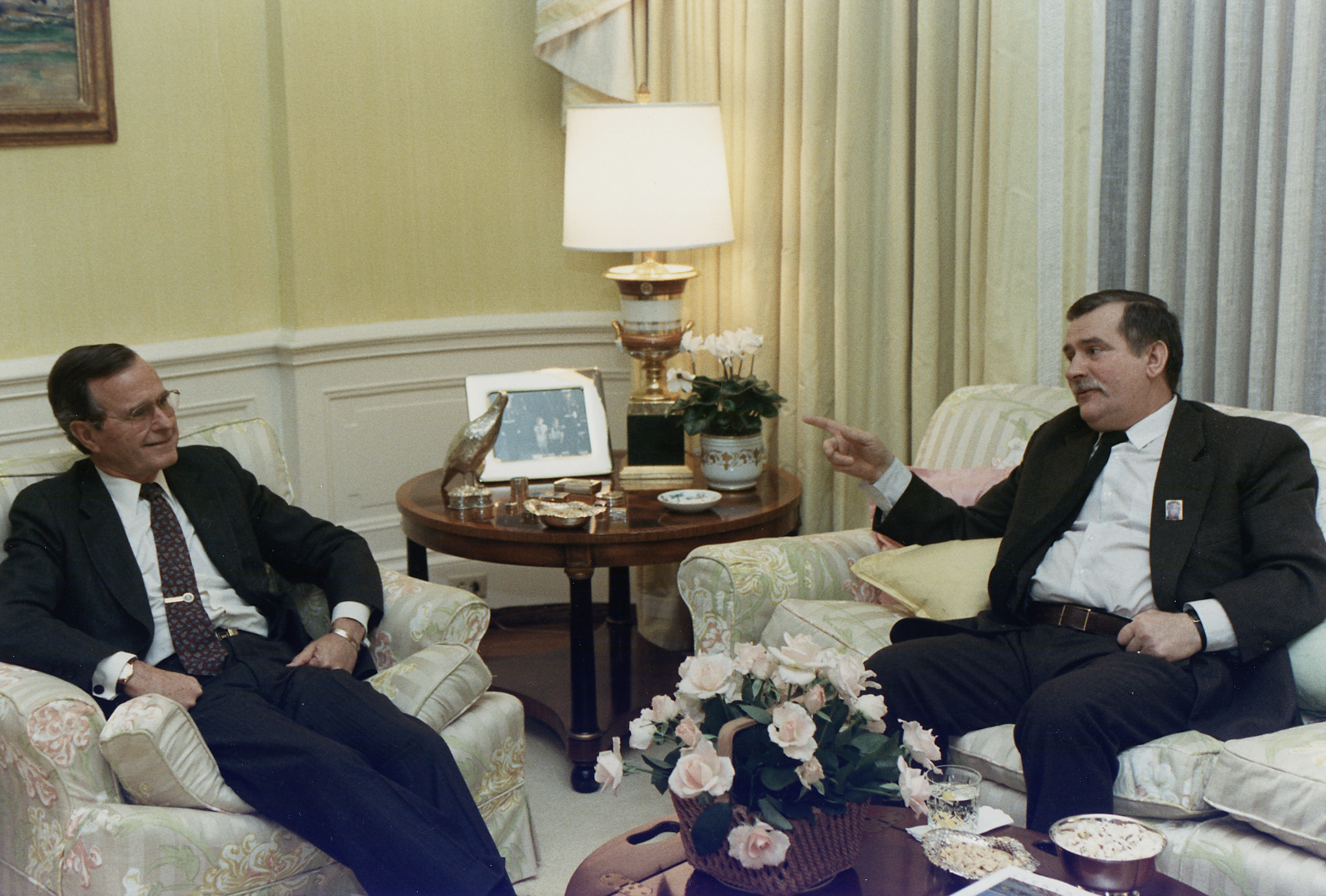
U.S. President George H. W. Bush meets privately with Wałęsa, November 1989.

While ostensibly only the chairman of Solidarity, Wałęsa played a key role in practical politics. In August 1989, he persuaded leaders of parties formerly allied with the Communist Party to form a non-Communist coalition government – the first non-Communist government in the Soviet Bloc. The parliament elected Tadeusz Mazowiecki as the first non-Communist Prime Minister of Poland in more than forty years. In November 1989, he delivered the speech "We the People" – taken from the preamble to the US Constitution.

== Presidency ==
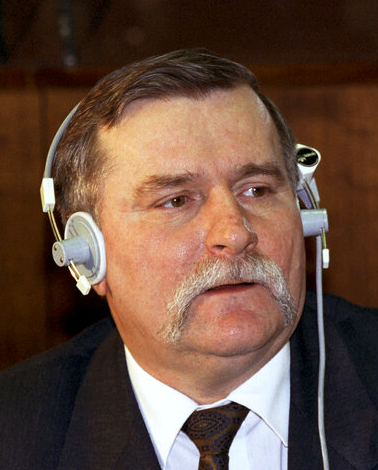
- Wałęsa in 1991
- Presidency of Lech Wałęsa; 22 December 1990 – 22 December 1995
- President: Lech Wałęsa
- Party: Independent
- Election: 1990
- Seat: Belweder

Graphical summary of Lech Wałęsa's approval rating polls

Following the June 1989 parliamentary elections, Wałęsa was disappointed that some of his former fellow campaigners were satisfied to govern alongside former Communists. He decided to run for the newly re-established office of president, using the slogan, "I don't want to, but I have to" ("Nie chcę, ale muszę."). On 9 December 1990, Wałęsa won the presidential election, defeating Prime Minister Mazowiecki and other candidates to become Poland's first freely elected head of state in 63 years, and the first non-Communist head of state in 45 years. In 1993, he founded his own political party, the Nonpartisan Bloc for Support of Reforms (BBWR); the grouping's Polish-language acronym echoed that of Józef Piłsudski's "Nonpartisan Bloc for Cooperation with the Government", of 1928–1935, likewise an ostensibly non-political organization.

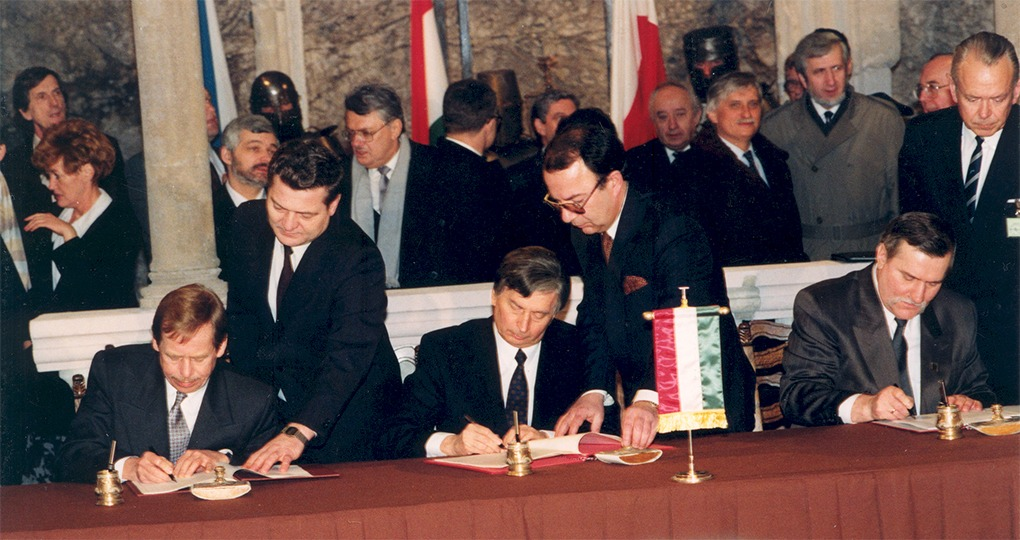
Wałęsa founding the Visegrád Group together with Czechoslovak President Václav Havel and Hungarian Prime Minister József Antall, February 1991:

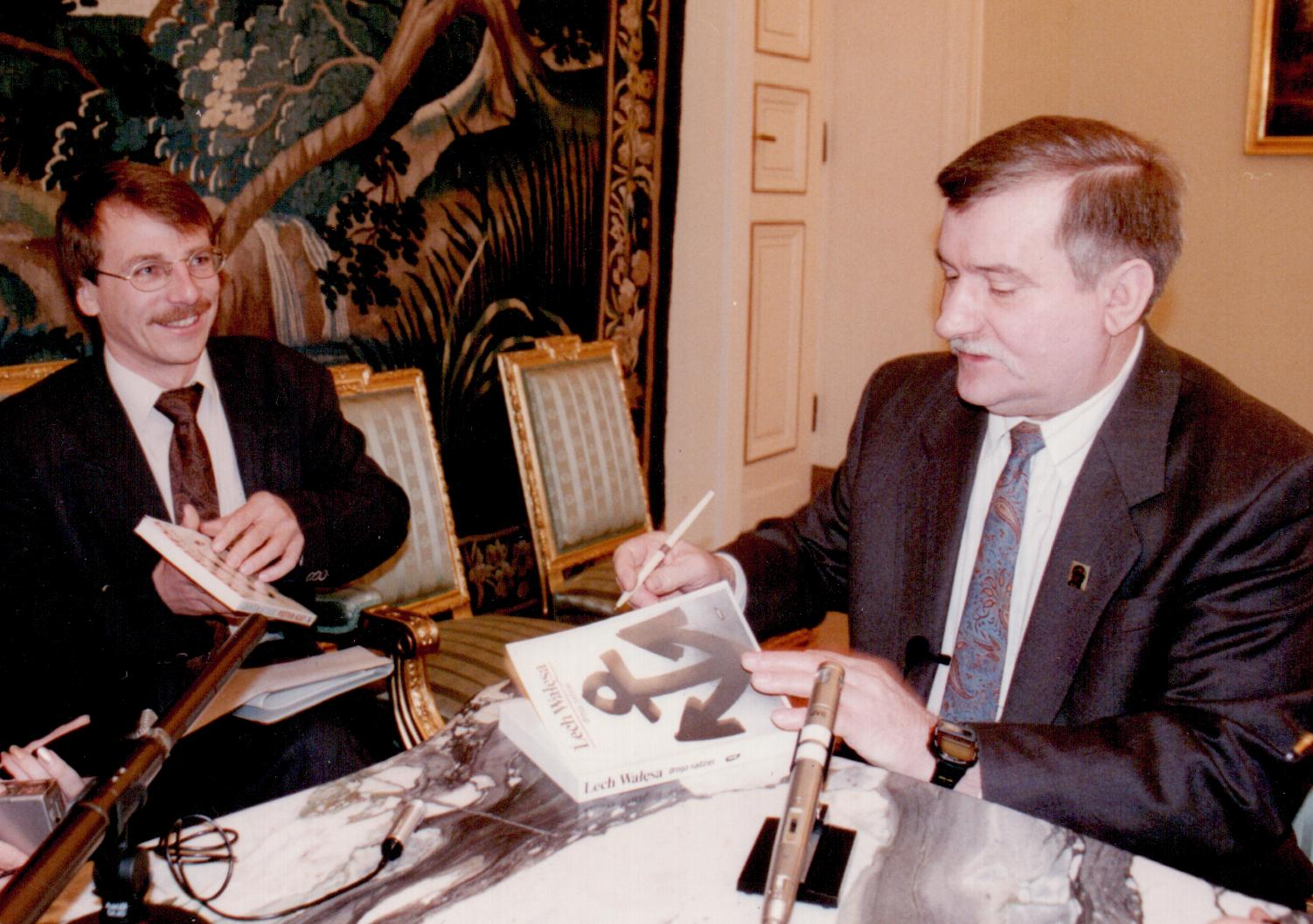
Wałęsa during an interview with German journalist Thomas Urban, March 1992

During his presidency, Wałęsa saw Poland through privatisation and transition to a free-market economy (the Balcerowicz Plan), Poland's first completely free parliamentary elections in 1991, and a period of redefinition of the country's foreign relations towards a pro-Western policy. He successfully negotiated the withdrawal of Russian troops from Poland in 1993 and won a substantial reduction in foreign debts. Wałęsa supported Poland's entry into NATO and the European Union, both of which occurred after his presidency, in 1999 and 2004, respectively. In the early 1990s, he proposed the creation of a sub-regional security system called NATO bis. The concept was supported by right-wing and populist movements in Poland but garnered little support abroad; Poland's neighbors, some of which (e.g. Lithuania, Belarus and Ukraine) had recently regained independence, tended to see the proposal as Polish neo-imperialism.

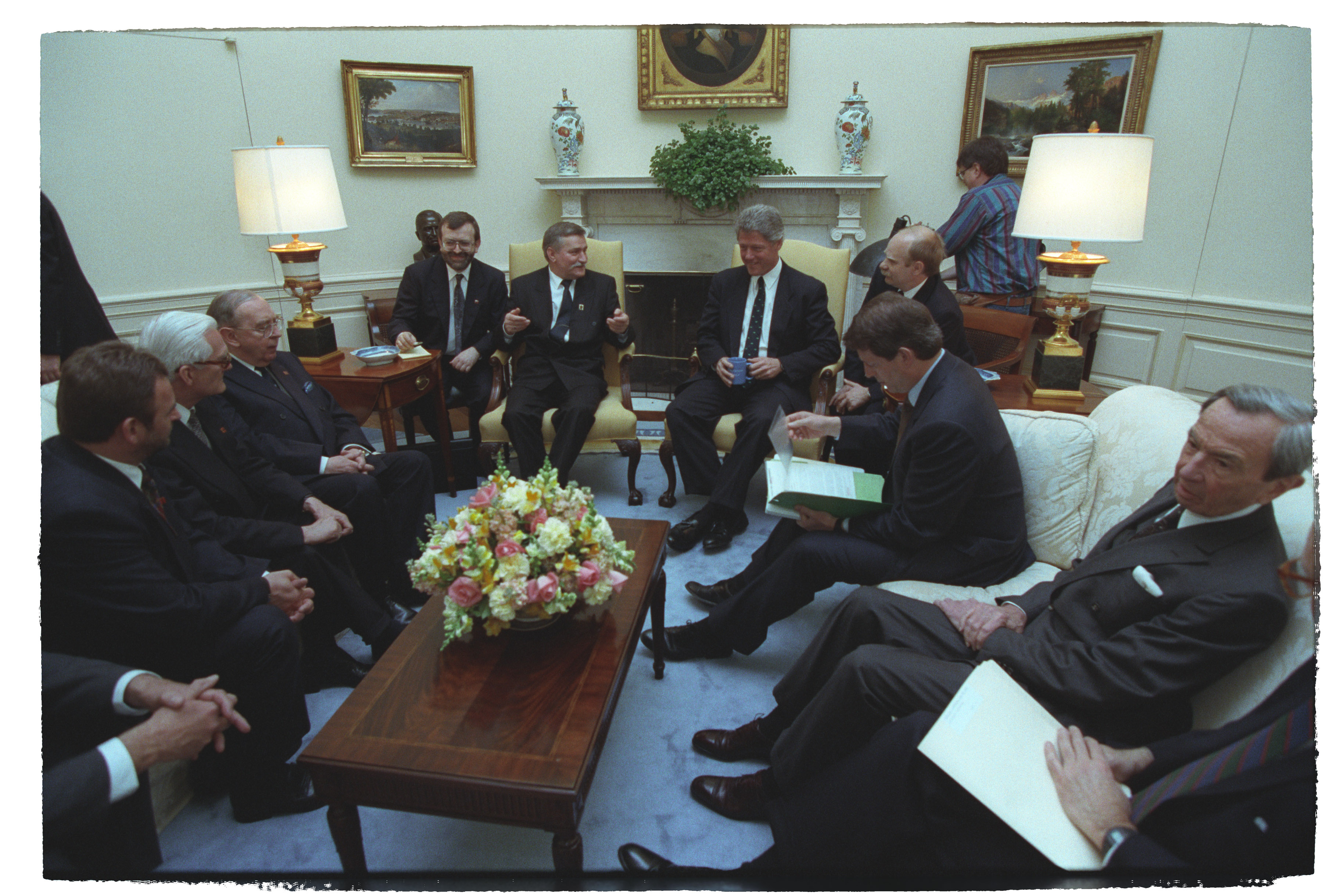
Wałęsa meeting with U.S. President Bill Clinton in the Oval Office, April 1993

Wałęsa has been criticised for a confrontational style and for instigating "war at the top", wherein former Solidarity allies clashed with one another, causing annual changes of government. This increasingly isolated Wałęsa on the political scene. As he lost political allies, he came to be surrounded by people who were viewed by the public as incompetent and disreputable. Mudslinging during election campaigns tarnished his reputation. Some thought Wałęsa, an ex-electrician with no higher education, was too plain-spoken and too undignified for the post of president. Others thought him too erratic in his views or complained he was too authoritarian and that he sought to strengthen his own power at the expense of the Sejm. Wałęsa's national security advisor, Jacek Merkel, credited the shortcomings of Wałęsa's presidency to his inability to comprehend the office of the president as an institution. He was an effective union leader capable of articulating what the workers felt, but as president, he had difficulty delegating power or navigating bureaucracy. Wałęsa's problems were compounded by the difficult transition to a market economy; although it was seen as highly successful in the long run, it lost Wałęsa's government much popular support at the time.

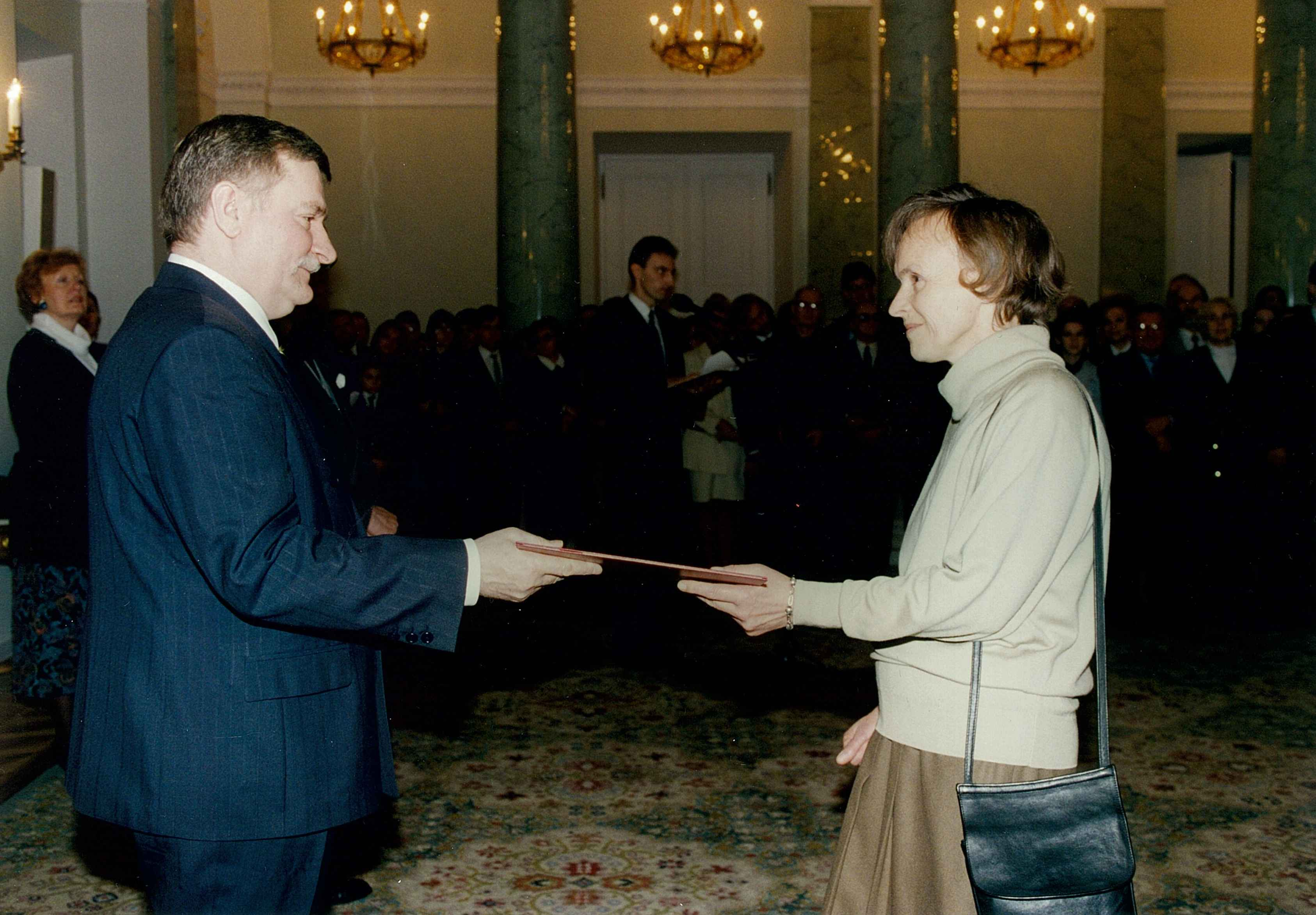
Wałęsa giving Elżbieta Kossecka a diploma of professor, 1994

Wałęsa supported the liberal and pro-market cabinet of Jan Krzysztof Bielecki from KLD in 1991 while opposing the conservative Prime Minister Jan Olszewski in 1991–1992. Following the fall of the Olszewski cabinet, he favored and designed the PSL leader Waldemar Pawlak for a new head of government. However, Pawlak failed to form a new cabinet after 33 days. Ultimately, Hanna Suchocka became a Prime Minister until a vote of no confidence against her governmentin May 1993, on which the President responded by dissolving Sejm and announcing new elections. Wałęsa's BBWR performed poorly in the 1993 parliamentary elections, leading to the establishment of the Second Pawlak cabinet that included social democratic SLD and agrarianist PSL, creating a cohabitation between President Wałęsa and the government. The new Prime Minister initially viewed by Wałęsa as a lesser evil, that would, quickly evolve into open hostility after a replacement of Pawlak by SLD member Józef Oleksy in early 1995; at times his popular support dwindled to 10% and he narrowly lost the 1995 presidential election, winning 33.11% of the vote in the first round and 48.28% in the run-off against Aleksander Kwaśniewski, who represented the resurgent Polish post-Communist social democratic Democratic Left Alliance (SLD). Wałęsa's fate was sealed by his poor handling of the media; in televised debates he appeared incoherent and rude; in response to Kwaśniewski's extended hand at the end of the first of the two debates, he replied that the post-Communist leader could "shake his leg". After the election, Wałęsa said he was going into "political retirement" and his role in politics became increasingly marginal.

== Post-presidency ==
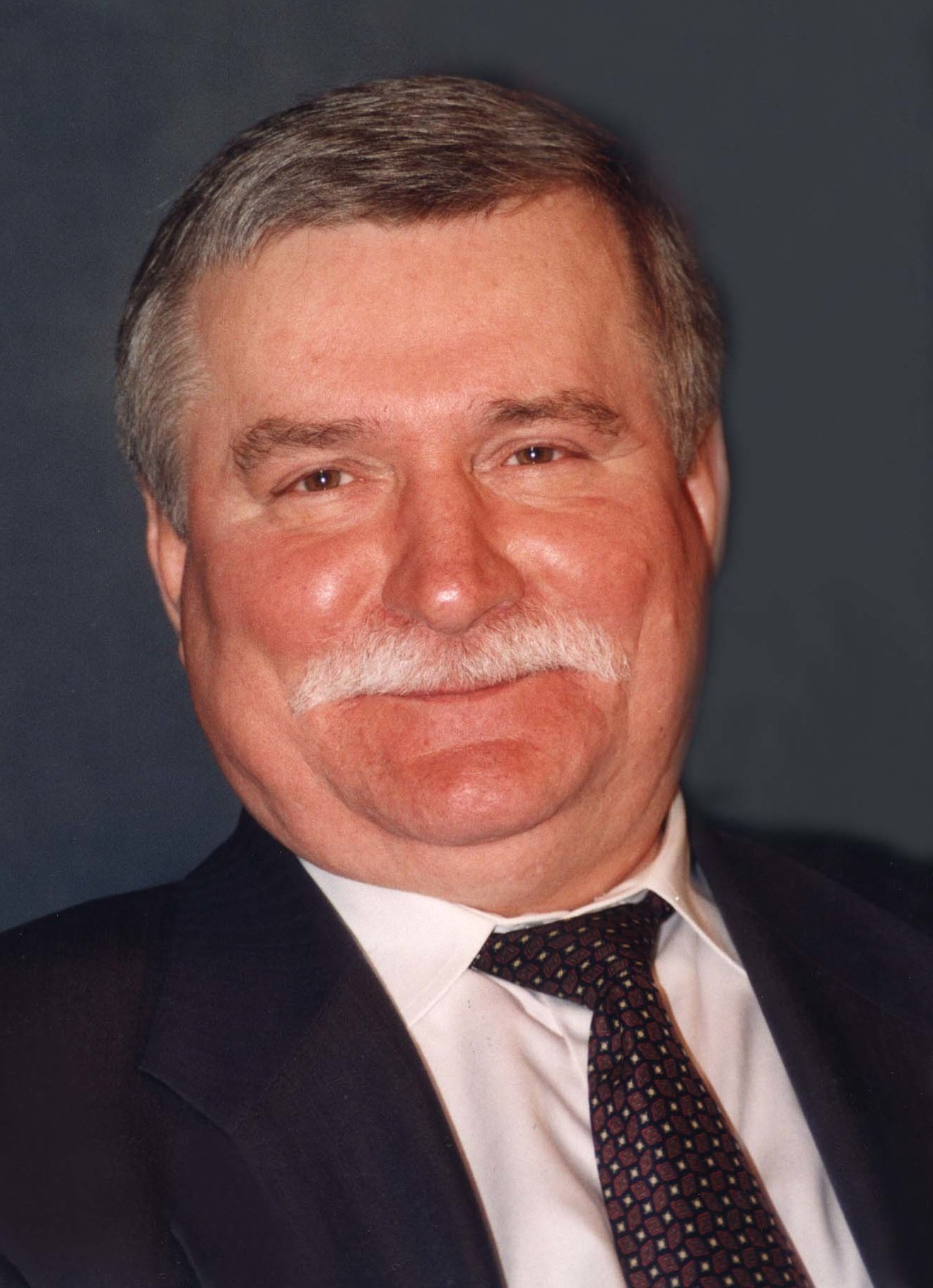
Wałęsa in 1996

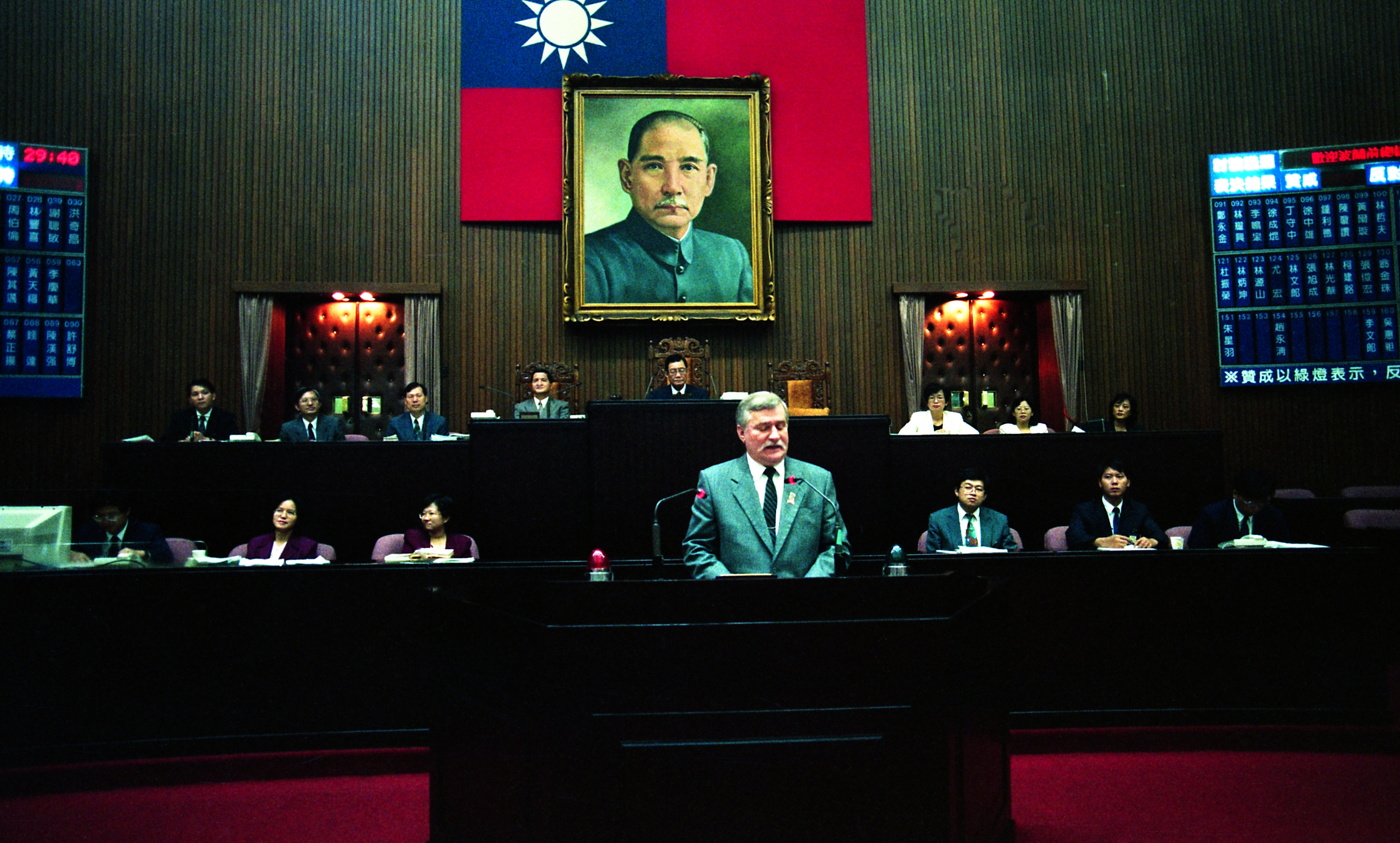
Wałęsa giving a speech at the Legislative Yuan in Taiwan in 1996

After losing the 1995 election, Wałęsa announced he would return to work as an electrician at the Gdańsk Shipyard. Soon afterwards, he changed his mind and chose to travel around the world on a lecture circuit. Wałęsa developed a portfolio of three lectures ("The Impact of an Expanded NATO on Global Security", "Democracy: The Never-Ending Battle" and "Solidarity: The New Millennium"), and reads them at universities and public events with an appearance fee of around £50,000 ($70,000).

In 1995, Wałęsa founded the Lech Wałęsa Institute, a think tank with a mission "to popularise the achievements of Polish Solidarity, educate young generations, promote democracy, and build civil society in Poland and around the world". In 1997, he founded a new party, Christian Democracy of the Third Polish Republic, hoping it would help him to successfully run in future elections. Wałęsa's contention for the 2000 presidential election ended with a crushing defeat when he polled 1.01% of the vote. Wałęsa polled in seventh place, after which he announced his withdrawal from Polish politics.

In 2006, Wałęsa quit Solidarity in protest of the union's support of the ruling right-wing Law and Justice party, and Lech and Jarosław Kaczyński – twin brothers who had been prominent in Solidarity and were now serving as the country's president and prime minister, respectively. The main point of disagreement was Kaczyński's focus on rooting out those who had been involved in Communist rule and their party's attempt to make public all the files of the former Communist secret police. Until then, only members of the government and parliament had to declare any connection with the former security services. Wałęsa and his supporters argued the so-called transparency legislation advocated by the government might turn into a witch hunt and the more than 500,000 Poles who had possibly collaborated with the Communist secret police could face exposure.

=== Political views ===
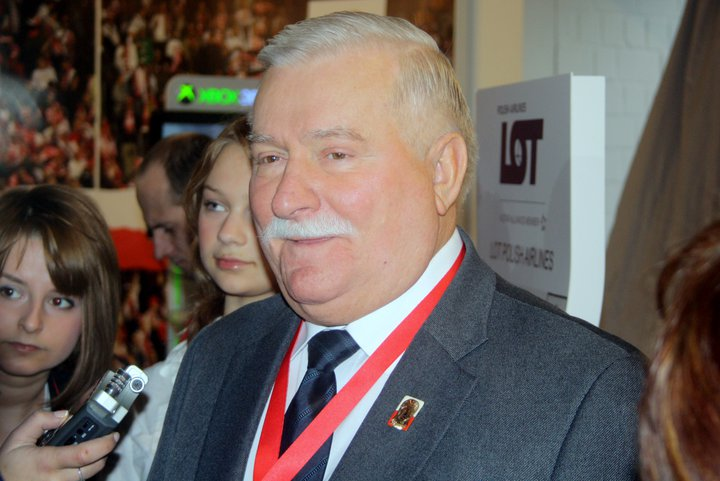
Wałęsa speaks at a tourism trade fair in Berlin, 2011.

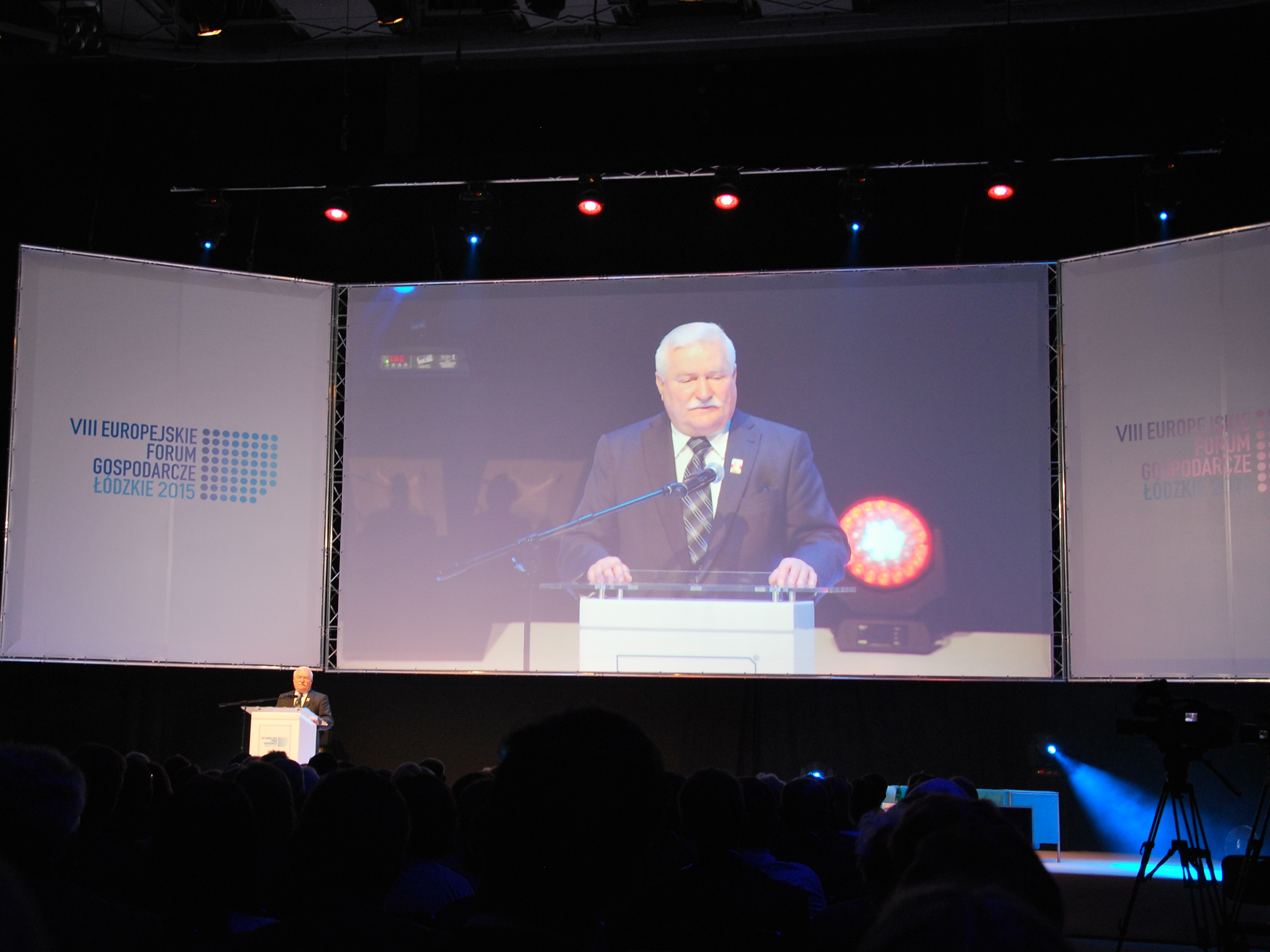
Wałęsa speaks on VIII European Economic Forum, 2015.

In 2011, Wałęsa rejected Lithuania's Order of Vytautas the Great due to his concerns over the treatment of the Polish minority and Polish culture by the Lithuanian government.

Wałęsa had previously displayed a conservative stance on LGBT rights. In 2013, he said on Polish television: "I do not wish for this minority, which I tolerate and understand, to impose itself on the majority". Referring to Robert Biedroń, he argued that, considering they represent less than one percent of Polish society, homosexual MPs should sit "in the last row of the parliament, or even behind its walls". After sharp international criticism, including the San Francisco Board of Supervisors's decision to rename Walesa Street as a result of these remarks, Wałęsa apologised for his comments, stressing that "being a man of old date, in my view one's sexual orientation should lie in one's intimate sphere". He said that his intentions were "distorted by the media" and that homosexuality should be respected. Over the following years, Wałęsa's views shifted, and he has voiced his support for the introduction of same-sex marriage in Poland and has repeatedly met with Biedroń, whom he called "a talent" and "a future president of Poland".

In 2013, Wałęsa suggested the creation of a political union between Poland and Germany. In 2014, in a widely publicised interview, Wałęsa expressed his disappointment in another Nobel laureate, United States president Barack Obama: he told CNN, "When he was elected there was great hope in the world. We were hoping that Obama would reclaim moral leadership for America, but that failed [...] in terms of politics and morality America no longer leads the world". Wałęsa also accused Obama of not deserving his Nobel Peace Prize; during the 2012 United States presidential campaign he endorsed Obama's opponent Mitt Romney.

In September 2015, Wałęsa, referring to the migrant crisis in Europe, said: "watching the refugees on television, I noticed that [...] they are well fed, well dressed and maybe even are richer than we are [...] If Europe opens its gates, soon millions will come through and while living among us will start exercising their own customs, including beheading". In August 2017, ten Nobel Peace Prize laureates, including Wałęsa, urged Saudi Arabia to stop the executions of 14 young people for participating in the 2011–2012 Saudi Arabian protests.

Wałęsa regarded a victory by Donald Trump in the 2024 United States presidential election as a "misfortune" both for the United States and the world, without providing further explanation. In March 2025, he and other former Polish political prisoners wrote a letter to Trump expressing their "horror and distaste" with his conduct during a contentious meeting between him and Ukrainian president Volodymyr Zelenskyy, which took place in the backdrop of American aid during the Russian invasion of Ukraine. Wałęsa has actively backed Ukraine's defence, calling upon NATO to continually provide support and suggesting a Ukrainian victory is imperative to protecting democracy. He calls for reducing Russia's population to "less than 50 million inhabitants" by organising an "uprising of the peoples" who have been "annexed" so that Russia no longer poses a threat to neighboring countries. From August to October 2025, he traveled around the United States and Canada to promote the idea of "Solidarity" and commemorate its 45th anniversary. During this trip he met Bill Clinton.

== Secret police allegations ==
Despite the 2000 ruling of a special lustration court affirming his innocence, for many years there have been allegations that Wałęsa was an informant of the Security Service of the Polish People's Republic (Służba Bezpieczeństwa or SB), the Communist security services, in his twenties. In his 2002 book titled The Polish Revolution: Solidarity, British historian Timothy Garton Ash writes that Wałęsa, while vehemently denying being a regular Security Service informer, admitted that he had "signed something" under interrogation in the 1970s. In 2008, a book written by historians Sławomir Cenckiewicz and Piotr Gontarczyk titled SB a Lech Wałęsa. Przyczynek do biografii (SB and Lech Wałęsa. Contribution to biography) purported to show that Wałęsa, codenamed Bolek, had been an operative for the security services from 1970 to 1976.

The issue of Wałęsa's alleged collaboration with the communist regime resurfaced again in February 2016, when the Institute of National Remembrance seized materials from the widow of Czesław Kiszczak, former minister of the Ministry of Interior, that were said to document Wałęsa's role as a spy for the security services. In 2017, a handwriting study ordered by the government-controlled Institute of National Remembrance (INR), stated that signatures on several documents from the 1970s belonged to Wałęsa. The exact nature of Wałęsa's relationship with Security Service continues to be a source of scholarly debate among historians. In 2018 INR Court Case against Wałęsa was dismissed, as the investigation concluded: "The reason for discontinuing the investigation was the finding that the above-mentioned act had not been committed," the release stated, which would indicate that Wałęsa could be innocent. The final case against Wałęsa was ultimately dismissed in 2026.

=== 2000 Lustration Court ruling ===
On 12 August 2000, Wałęsa, who was running a presidential campaign at the time, was cleared by the special Lustration Court of charges that he collaborated with the Communist-era secret services and reported on the activities of his fellow shipyard workers, due to the lack of evidence. Anti-Communists Piotr Naimski, one of the first members of the Workers' Defence Committee that led to the Solidarity trade union, and Antoni Macierewicz, Wałęsa's former Interior Minister, testified against him in the closed vetting trial. Naimski, who said he testified with a "heavy heart", expressed his disappointment that Wałęsa "made a mistake by not going openly to the public, and he has missed an important chance". According to Naimski, the court cleared Wałęsa on "technical grounds" because it did not find certain original documents – many of which had been destroyed since 1989 – that offered sufficient proof that Wałęsa was lying.

In 1992, Naimski, as the head of the State Protection Office, started the process of screening people suspected of being Communist collaborators in Poland. In June that year, he helped Antoni Macierewicz prepare a list of 64 members of the government and parliament who were named as spies in the police records; these included Wałęsa, then the Polish president. Wałęsa's name was included on the list after a wrenching internal debate about the virtues of honesty versus political discretion. In response to the publication of this list, President Wałęsa immediately engineered the fall of prime minister Jan Olszewski and the dismissal of Interior Minister Macierewicz. A parliamentary committee later concluded Wałęsa had not signed an agreement with the secret police.

A 1997 Polish law made vetting a requirement for those seeking high public office. According to the law, it is not a crime to have collaborated, but those who deny it and are found to have lied are banned from political life for ten years. The 2000 presidential election was the first use of this law. Despite helping Wałęsa in 2005 to receive the official status of a "victim of communist regime" from the Institute of National Remembrance (IPN), this court ruling did not convince many Poles. In November 2009, Wałęsa sued the president of Poland, Lech Kaczyński, over his repeated collaboration allegations. Five months later, Kaczyński failed to invite Wałęsa to the commemoration service at Katyn, which almost certainly saved Wałęsa's life because the presidential plane crashed, killing all on board. In August 2010, Wałęsa lost a libel case against Krzysztof Wyszkowski, his former fellow activist, who also publicly accused Wałęsa of being a communist agent in 1970s.

=== SB and Lech Wałęsa. A contribution to biography (2008) ===
The most comprehensive analysis of Wałęsa's possible collaboration with the secret police was provided in a 2008 book SB a Lech Wałęsa. Przyczynek do biografii (SB and Lech Wałęsa. Contribution to biography). The book was written by two historians from the Institute of National Remembrance, Sławomir Cenckiewicz and Piotr Gontarczyk, and included documents from the archives of the secret police that were inherited by the institute. Among the documents were registration cards, memos, notes from the secret police and reports from the informant.

The book's authors argue that Wałęsa, working under the code name Bolek, (Note: Bolek was a main character of the popular children's cartoon series Bolek and Lolek. Wałęsa's father's name was also Bolesław (or Bolek in diminutive).) was a secret police informant from 1970 (after being released from jail) until 1976 (before he was fired from the shipyard). According to the authors, "he wrote reports and informed on more than 20 people and some of them were persecuted by the Communist police. He identified people and eavesdropped on his colleagues at work while they were listening to Radio Free Europe for example". The book describes the fate of seven of his alleged victims; information regarding others was destroyed or stolen from the files. According to them, Wałęsa received more than 13,000 zlotys as remuneration for his services from the Security Service, while the monthly salary at the time was about 3,500 zlotys. (Note: In a book published in 2011, Wałęsa's wife Danuta said she believed the source of her husband's extra money during the 1970s was lottery winnings.) The authors said oppositionist activity in Poland in the first half of 1970s was minimal and Wałęsa's role in it was quite marginal. However, according to the book, despite formally renouncing his ties with the Security Service in 1976, Wałęsa went on to have contacts with Communist officials.

The authors also claim that during his 1990–1995 presidency, Wałęsa used his office to destroy the evidence of his collaboration with the secret police by removing incriminating documents from the archives. According to the book, historians discovered that with the help of the state intelligence agency, Wałęsa, Interior Minister Andrzej Milczanowski, and other members of Wałęsa's administration had borrowed from the archives the secret police files that had connections to Wałęsa, and returned them with key pages removed. When it was discovered at the turn of 1995/1996, the following prosecutorial inquiry was discontinued for political reasons despite the case attracting much public attention.

Sławomir Cenckiewicz also said that in 1983, when Wałęsa was nominated for the Nobel Peace Prize, the secret police tried to embarrass him and leaked information about Wałęsa's previous collaboration with the government. By this time, though, Wałęsa was already so popular that most Poles did not believe the official media and dismissed the allegations as a manipulation by the Communist authorities. The book's first print run sold out in Poland within hours. The book received substantial coverage in the media, provoked nationwide debate, and was noted by the international press. Wałęsa vowed to sue the authors but never did.

=== Kiszczak archives ===
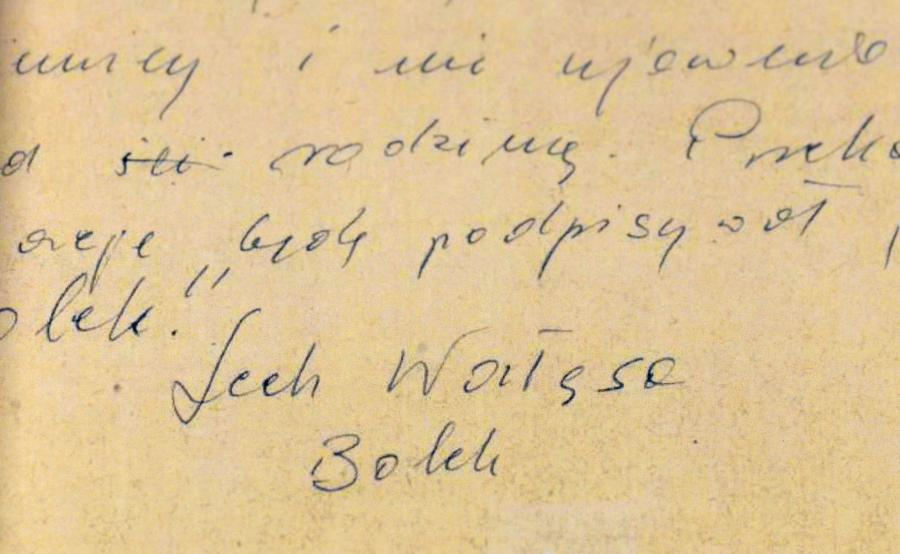
Signature Lech Wałęsa-Bolek on the collaboration agreement with Security Service from the Kiszczak archives

On 18 February 2016, the government-affiliated INR in Warsaw announced it had seized a package of original documents that allegedly proved Wałęsa was a paid Security Service informant. The documents dated from the period 1970–1976; they were seized from the home of a recently deceased former interior minister, General Czesław Kiszczak. The documents' authenticity was confirmed by an archival expert, but the prosecutors demanded a handwriting examination. Eventually, the requested examination concluded that the documents were authentic, which suggest he was a paid informant. Wałęsa previously said that he had signed a commitment to inform document, but that he had never acted on it.

The dossier consists of two folders. The first is a "personal file" containing 90 pages of documents, including a handwritten commitment to cooperate with Polish Security Service dated 21 December 1970, and signed Lech Wałęsa – Bolek with a pledge he would never admit his collaboration with secret police "not even to family"; the file also contains the confirmations of having received funds. The second is a "work file" which contains 279 pages of documents, including numerous reports by Bolek on his co-workers at Gdańsk Shipyard, and notes by Security Service officers from meetings with him. According to one note, Wałęsa agreed to collaborate out of fear of persecution after the workers' protest in 1970. The documents also show that at first Bolek eagerly provided information on the opinions and actions of his co-workers and took money for the information, but his enthusiasm diminished and the quality of his information decreased until he was deemed no longer valuable and collaboration with him was terminated in 1976.

The sealed dossier also contained a letter, hand-written by Kiszczak in April 1996, in which he informs the Director of the Polish Central Archives of Modern Records (Archiwum Akt Nowych) about the accompanying files documenting the collaboration of Wałęsa with the Polish Security Service and asks him not to publish this information until five years after Wałęsa's death. In his letter, Kiszczak said he kept the documents out of reach: before the 1989 revolution, trying to protect Wałęsa's reputation; and afterwards to make sure they did not disappear or were used for political reasons. This letter and the accompanying documents had never been sent.

On 16 February 2016, about three months after Kiszczak's death, his widow Maria approached the Institute of National Remembrance and offered to sell the documents to the archives for 90,000 zlotys ($23,000). However, according to Polish law, all documents of the political police must be handed in to the state. The administration of the institute notified the prosecutor's office, which conducted a police search of the Kiszczaks' house and seized all the historic documents. Maria Kiszczak later said she had not read her husband's letter and had "made a mistake".

=== Wałęsa's response ===
For years, Wałęsa vehemently denied collaborating with the Polish Security Service and dismissed the incriminating files as forgeries created by the Security Service to compromise him. Wałęsa also denies that during his presidency he removed documents incriminating him from the archives. Until 2008, he denied having ever seen his Security Service file. After the publication of the book SB a Lech Wałęsa in 2008, he said that while he was president, "I did borrow the file, but didn't remove anything from it. I saw there were some documents there about me and that they were clearly forgeries. I told my secretaries to tape up and seal the file. I wrote "don't open" on it. But someone didn't obey, removed the papers, now casting suspicion on me". Wałęsa's interior minister Andrzej Milczanowski denied the cover-up and said he "had full legal rights to make those documents available to President Wałęsa" and that "no original documents were removed from the file", which contained only photocopies.

Wałęsa has offered conflicting statements regarding the authenticity of the documents. Initially he appeared to come close to an admission, saying in 1992, "in December 1970, I signed three or four documents" to escape from the secret police. In his 1987 autobiography A Way of Hope, Wałęsa said, "It is also the truth that I had not left that clash completely pure. They gave me a condition: sign! And then I signed." He denied that he acted upon the collaboration agreement. However, in his later years Wałęsa said all the documents are forgeries and told the BBC in 2008, "you will not find any signature of mine agreeing to collaborate anywhere".

In 2009, after the publication of another biography connecting him with the secret police (Lech Wałęsa: Idea and History by Paweł Zyzak), Wałęsa threatened to leave Poland if historians continue to question his past. He said that before revealing such information "a historian must decide whether this serves Poland". After the accusations against him resurfaced with the discovery of the Kiszczak dossier on 16 February 2016, Wałęsa called the files "lies, slander and forgeries", and said he "never took money and never made any spoken or written report on anyone". He said of the Polish public, which was about to believe in the allegations, "you have betrayed me, not me you", and "it was I who safely led Poland to a complete victory over communism". On 20 February 2016, Wałęsa wrote in his blog that a secret police officer had begged him to sign the financial documents in the 1970s because the officer had lost money entrusted to him to purchase a vehicle. Wałęsa appealed to the officer to step forward and clear him of the accusations.

== Personal life ==
On 8 November 1969, Wałęsa married Mirosława Danuta Gołoś, who worked at a flower shop near the Lenin Shipyard where Wałęsa worked. Soon after they married, she began using her middle name more often than her first name, as per Lech's request. The couple had eight children; Bogdan (born 1970), Sławomir (1972–2025), Przemysław (1974–2017), Jarosław (born 1976), Magdalena (born 1978), Anna (born 1980), Maria-Wiktoria (born 1982) and Brygida (born 1984). As of 2016, Anna was running her father's office in Gdańsk and Jarosław was a European MP from 2009 to 2019.

In 2008, Wałęsa underwent a coronary artery stent placement and the implantation of a cardiac pacemaker at the Houston Methodist Hospital in Houston, Texas. He underwent a heart operation in 2021. In January 2022, Wałęsa tested positive for COVID-19. He said he had received three doses of the COVID-19 vaccine. He is a devout Catholic.

== Honours ==
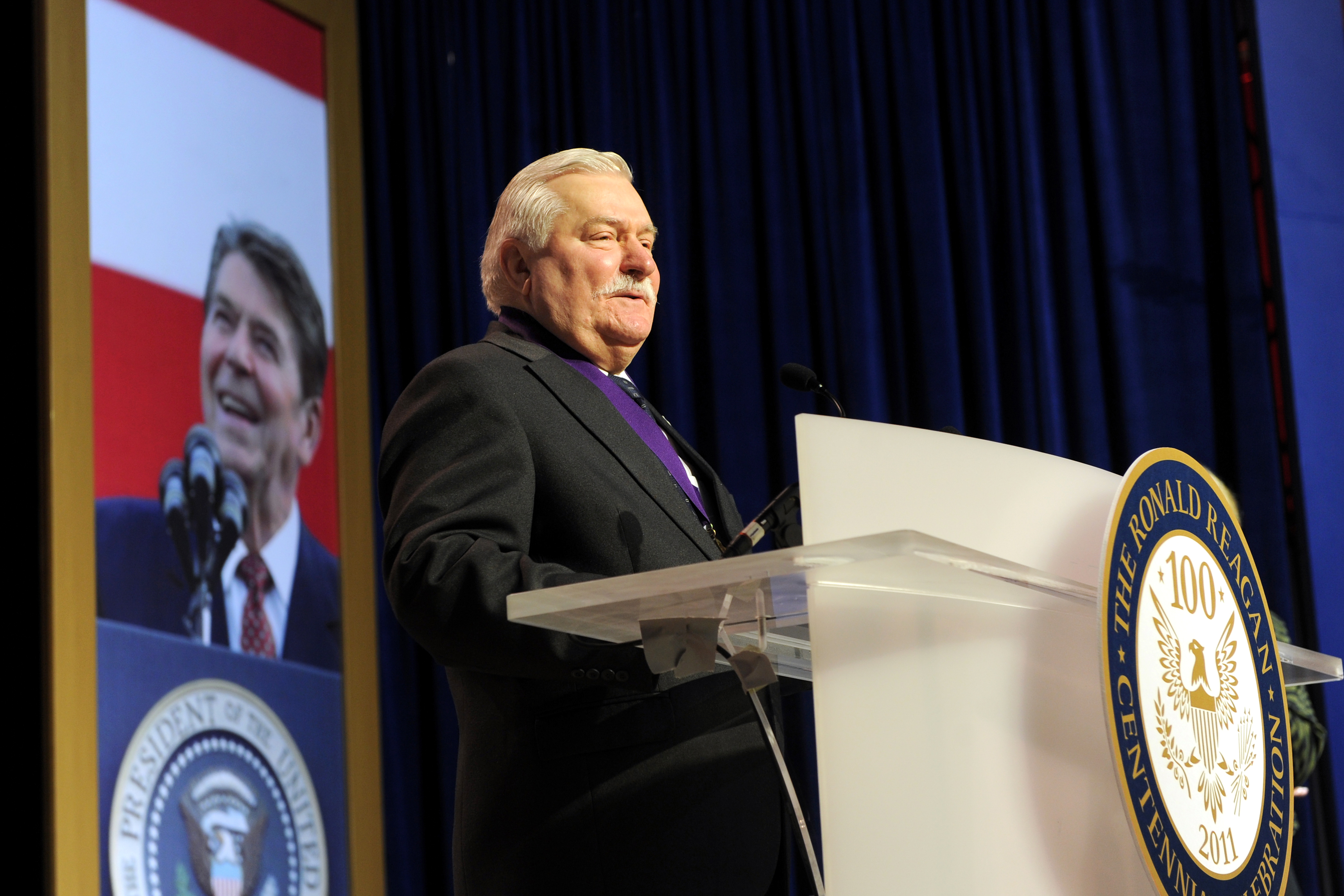
Wałęsa receiving the Ronald Reagan Freedom Award, 2011

In 1983, Wałęsa was awarded the Nobel Peace Prize. Since then, he has received more than 30 state decorations and more than 50 awards from 30 countries, including Order of the Bath (United Kingdom), Order of Merit (Germany), Legion of Honour (France) and European Human Rights Prize (Parliamentary Assembly of the Council of Europe 1989). In 14 July 1994, He was honored by the Order of the State of Republic of Turkey, which is the highest state order awarded to foreign nationals by the President of the Republic of Turkey. In 2011, he declined to accept the Lithuanian highest order, citing his displeasure at Lithuania's policy towards the Polish diaspora. In 2008, he established the Lech Wałęsa Award.

In 2004, Gdańsk International Airport was officially renamed Gdańsk Lech Wałęsa Airport and Wałęsa's signature was incorporated into the airport's logo. A college hall in Northeastern Illinois University (Chicago), six streets, and five schools in Canada, France, Sweden and Poland also were named after Lech Wałęsa

Wałęsa was named Man of the Year by Time magazine (1981), Financial Times (1980), Saudi Gazette (1989) and 12 other newspapers and magazines. He was awarded more than 45 honorary doctorates by universities around the world, including Harvard University and Sorbonne. He was named an honorary karate black belt by International Traditional Karate Federation. Wałęsa is also an honorary citizen of more than 30 cities, including London, Buffalo and Turin.

In the United States, Wałęsa was the first recipient of the Liberty Medal in 1989. That year, he also received the Presidential Medal of Freedom and became the first non-head-of-state to address a joint meeting of the United States Congress. In 2000, Wałęsa received the Golden Plate Award of the American Academy of Achievement. Wałęsa symbolically represented Europe by carrying the Olympic flag at the opening ceremony of the 2002 Winter Olympics. In 2004, he represented ten newly acceded EU countries during the official accession ceremony in Strasbourg. In 1993, the heraldic authority of the Kingdom of Sweden assigned Wałęsa a personal coat of arms on the occasion of his admittance into the Royal Order of the Seraphim.

== In popular culture ==
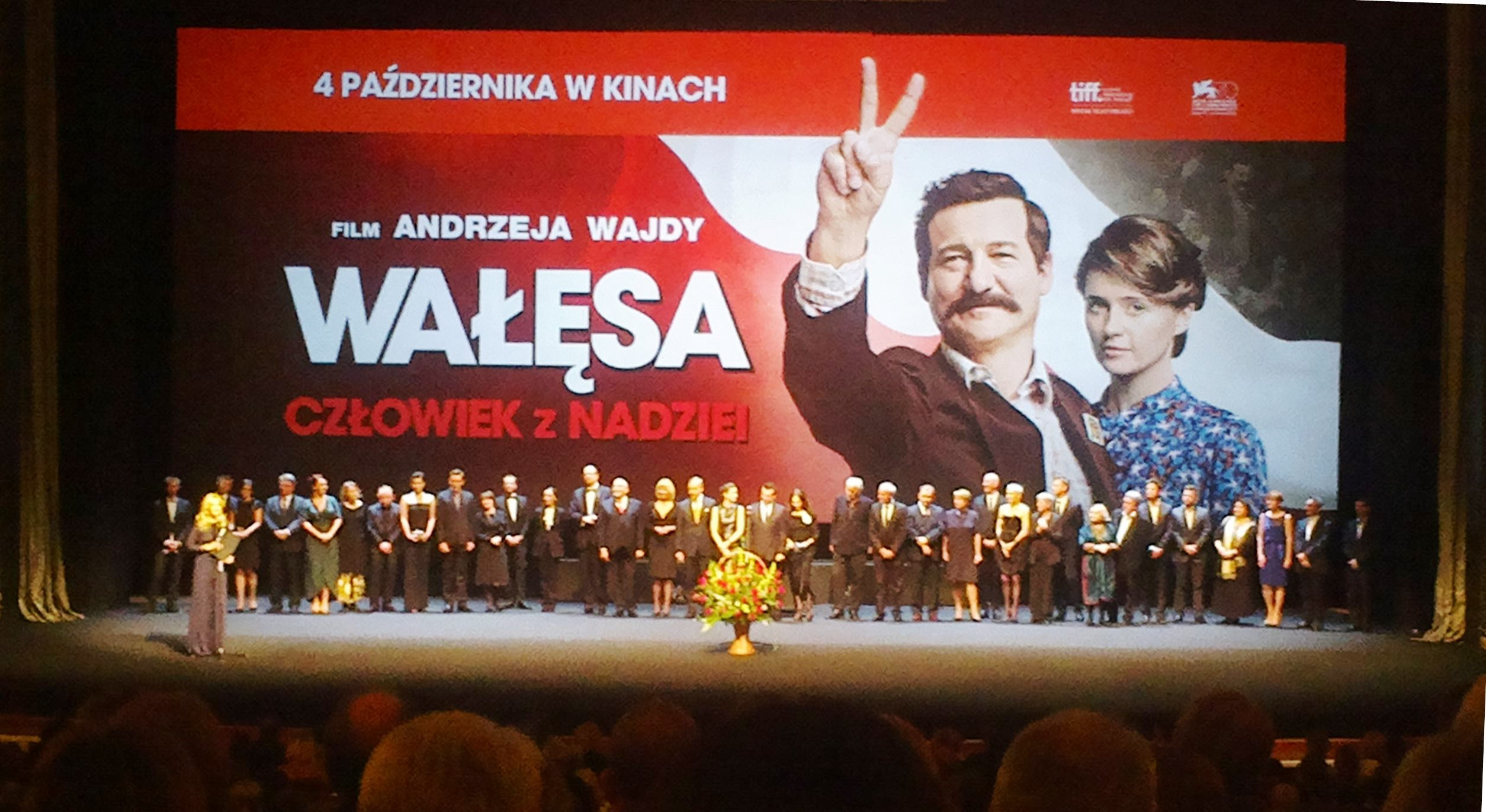
Premiere of Walesa. Man of Hope in Warsaw, 2013

Wałęsa has been portrayed as himself or a character based on him in a number of feature and television films. The two most notable of them are:

- Wałęsa: Man of Hope (2013) is a biographical drama by Oscar-winning filmmaker Andrzej Wajda about the lives of Wałęsa (Robert Więckiewicz) and his wife Danuta (Agnieszka Grochowska) from 1970 to 1989. It shows Wałęsa's change from a shipyard worker to a charismatic labor leader. The film was shot in the historical locations of the depicted events, including the former Lenin Shipyard. It won three awards, including Silver Hugo for Robert Więckiewicz at Chicago International Film Festival and a Pasinetti Award for Maria Rosaria Omaggio at Venice Film Festival, and was nominated for five more awards;
- Man of Iron (1981) is another Andrzej Wajda film about the Solidarity movement. The main character, a young worker Maciej Tomczyk (Jerzy Radziwiłowicz), is involved in the anti-Communist labor movement. Tomczyk is clearly portrayed as a parallel to Wałęsa, who appears as himself in the movie. The film was made during the brief relaxation of censorship in Poland between the formation of Solidarity in August 1980 and its suppression in December 1981. Wajda was awarded both the Palme d'Or and the Prize of the Ecumenical Jury at the Cannes Film Festival for the film. In 1982, it was nominated for Oscar as the Best Foreign Language Film and gained seven other awards and nominations.

Both of these films were produced in Poland. In December 1989, Warner Bros. intended to produce a "major" movie about Wałęsa, to be made in 1990 and released in 1991. The company paid Wałęsa a $1 million fee for the rights to produce a biopic. Although the movie was never made, this payment sparked controversy in Poland when, five years later, it emerged that Wałęsa concealed this income to avoid paying taxes on it. The Gdańsk tax office initiated a tax fraud case against Wałęsa but it was later dismissed because the five-year statute of limitations had already run out.

- Polish actor Jacek Lenartowicz played Walesa in the 2005 television miniseries Pope John Paul II.

English musician Peter Gabriel drew from Wałęsa and the Solidarity movement as one of multiple sources of inspiration for his 1982 song "Wallflower", about the plight of political prisoners in Europe and Latin America. That same year, Bono was inspired by Wałęsa to write U2's first hit single, "New Year's Day". Coincidentally, the Polish authorities lifted martial law on 1 January 1983, the same day this single was released. Wałęsa also became a hero of a number of Polish pop songs, including a satirical 1991 hit titled Nie wierzcie elektrykom (Don't Trust the Electricians) from the second studio album by the punk rock band Big Cyc, which featured a caricature of Wałęsa on its cover.

Patrick Dailly's chamber opera Solidarity, starring Kristen Brown as Wałęsa, was premiered by the San Francisco Cabaret Opera in Berkeley, California, in September 2009.

Wałęsa is also notable for his "Wałęsisms", his peculiar utterances, many of which had become a well-established part of Polish culture.

== Publications ==
- Wałęsa, Lech (1987). A Way of Hope. New York: Henry Holt and Company. ISBN 0805006680. LCCN 87021194. OL 2391768M.
- Wałęsa, Lech (1991). Droga do wolności [Road to Freedom] (in Polish). Warsaw: Editions Spotkania. ISBN 8385195033. LCCN 92155586. OL 1293474M.
- Wałęsa, Lech (1992). The Struggle and the Triumph: An Autobiography. Translated by Philip, Franklin. New York: Arcade Publishing. ISBN 1559701498. LCCN 91035875. OL 1555547M.
- Wałęsa, Lech (1995). Wszystko, co robię, robię dla Polski [All That I Do, I Do for Poland] (in Polish). Warsaw: Kancelaria Prezydenta RP. ISBN 8390434709. LCCN 96130042. OL 18320510M.

== Notes ==
Trade union offices
New title	Leader of Solidarity; 1980–1991	Succeeded by Marian Krzaklewski
Political offices
Preceded by Wojciech Jaruzelski	President of Poland; 1990–1995	Succeeded by Aleksander Kwaśniewski
Awards and achievements
Preceded by Alva Myrdal; Alfonso García Robles	Nobel Peace Prize Laureate; 1983	Succeeded by Desmond Tutu
