= Lech Wałęsa Institute =

Private non-profit organization

- Instytut Lecha Wałęsy
- Named after: Lech Wałęsa
- Formation: 1995
- Founder: Lech Wałęsa
- Founded at: Gdańsk, Poland
- Type: Private foundation
- Legal status: Nonprofit organization
- Website: www.ilw.org.pl/en/

Lech Wałęsa Institute (Polish: Instytut Lecha Wałęsy) is a non-governmental, non profit organization established in 1995 by Lech Wałęsa, Nobel Peace Prize Laureate and a first democratically elected President of the Republic of Poland.

== Founding ==
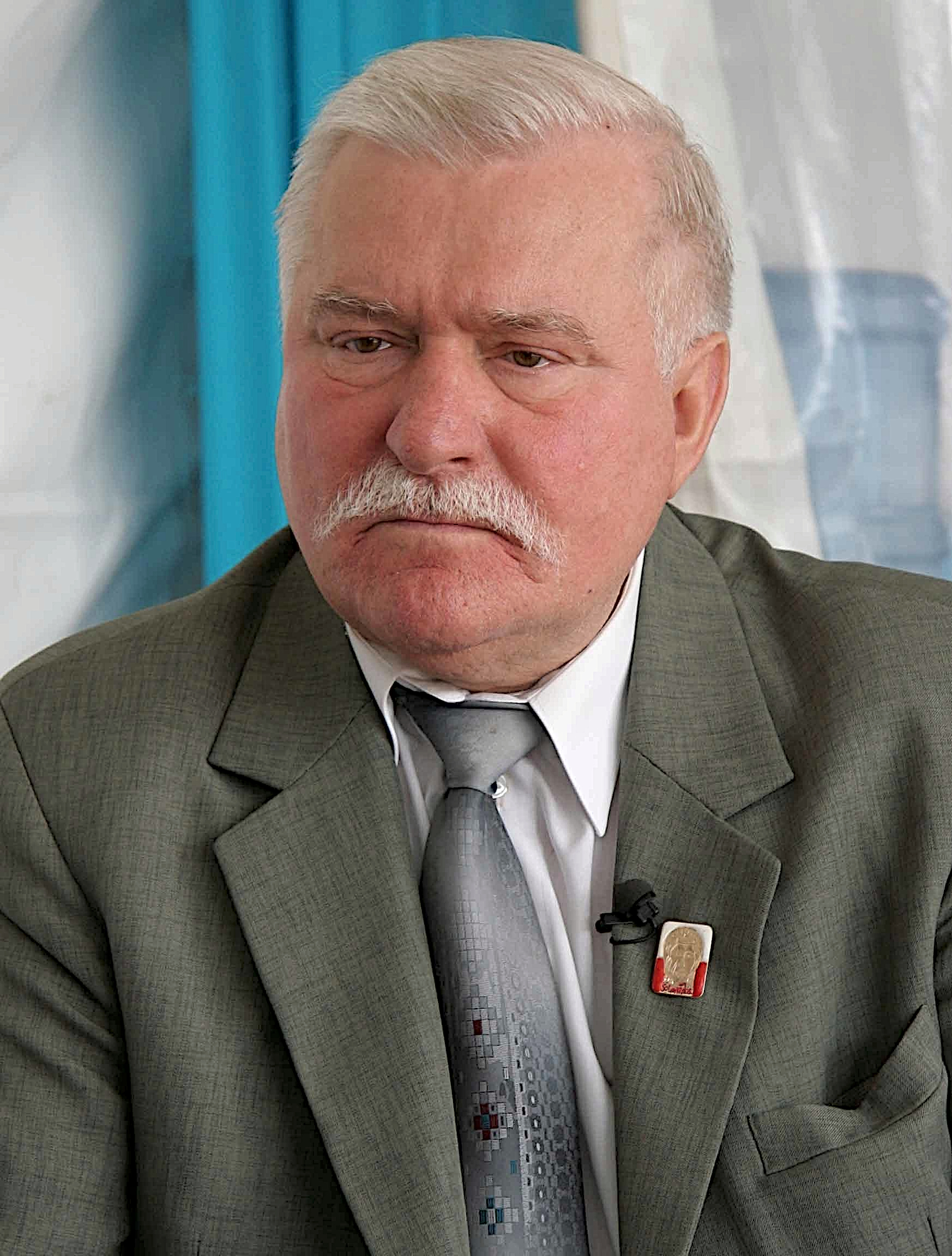
Lech Wałęsa – founder of the institute and the first democratically elected President of Poland. 2009

The Institute was formed and open on 22 December 1995, the last day of Lech Wałęsa's Presidency. Wałęsa established the institute to follow the example of western politicians. His desire was to model the Institute after Carter Center open by Jimmy Carter, 39th President of the United States, who spent his post-presidency “finding peaceful solutions to international conflicts, advancing democracy and human rights, and promoting economic and social development”, for which Carter, like Wałęsa before him, was awarded Nobel Peace Prize.

=== 1990's ===
In 1996 the organisation was a part of Akcja Wyborcza Solidarność which allowed Lech Wałęsa to participate in 1997 Polish parliamentary election. Later it was used as a backbone to form Lech Wałęsa's own political party named Chrześcijańska Demokracja III Rzeczypospolitej Polskiej. Wałęsa stood as the party's candidate in the 2000 presidential election but received only 1% of the vote. The ChDRP never gained substantial support.

=== Since 2000 ===
Since 2000 the role of institute changed to more educational approach. It mostly focuses on preserving the role of Solidarity movement and Polish political transition, as well as promoting knowledge about Poland's path to freedom on both the national and international levels.

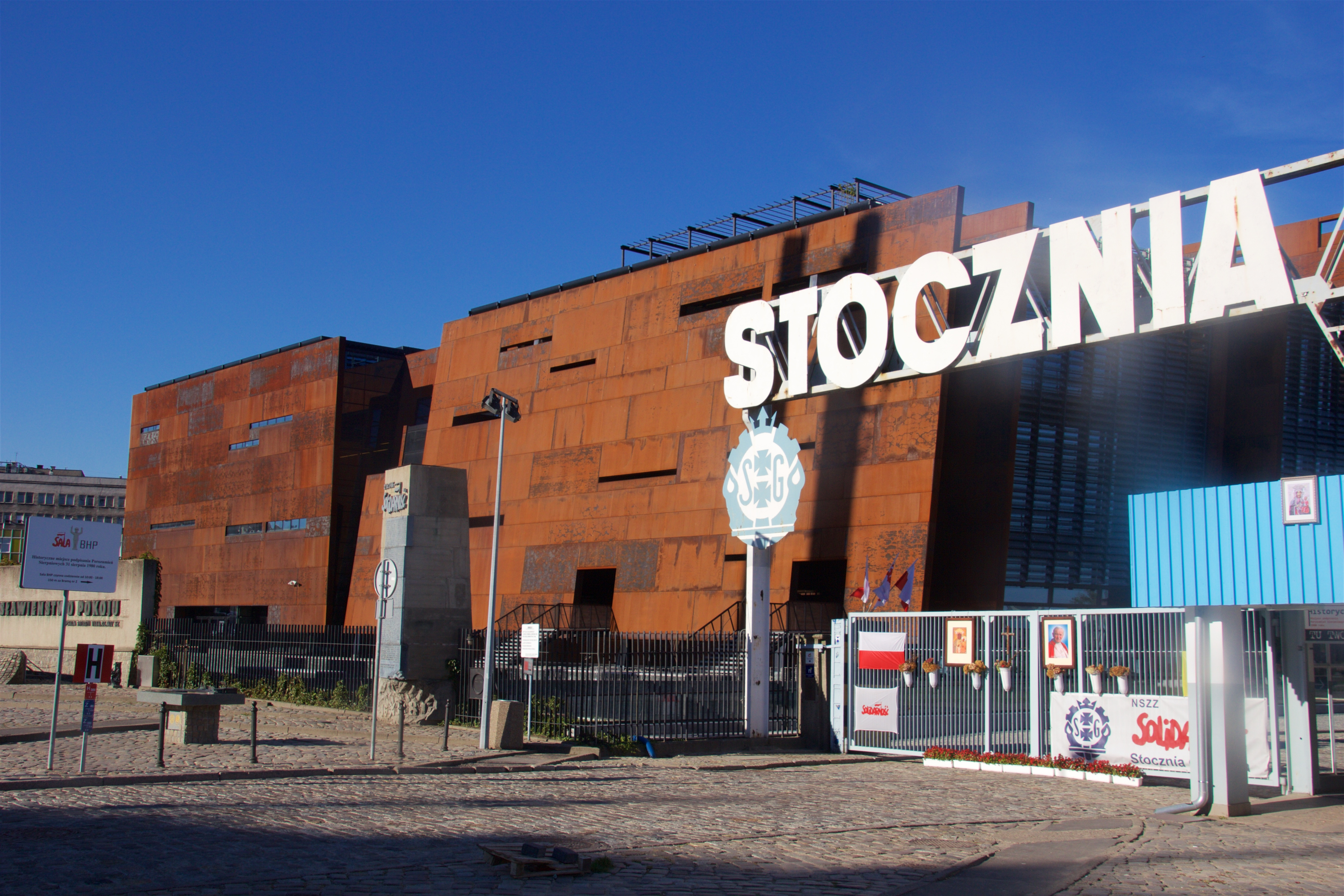
European Solidarity Centre – current headquarters of the Institute and the location of Wałęsa's office.

The institute also manages the Lech Wałęsa Library in the European Solidarity Centre in Gdańsk, which is located in Gdańsk Shipyard, in which Wałęsa was a worker when he led the Gdańsk shipyard strike in 1980. The European Solidarity Centre currently hosts the Institute's Headquarters.

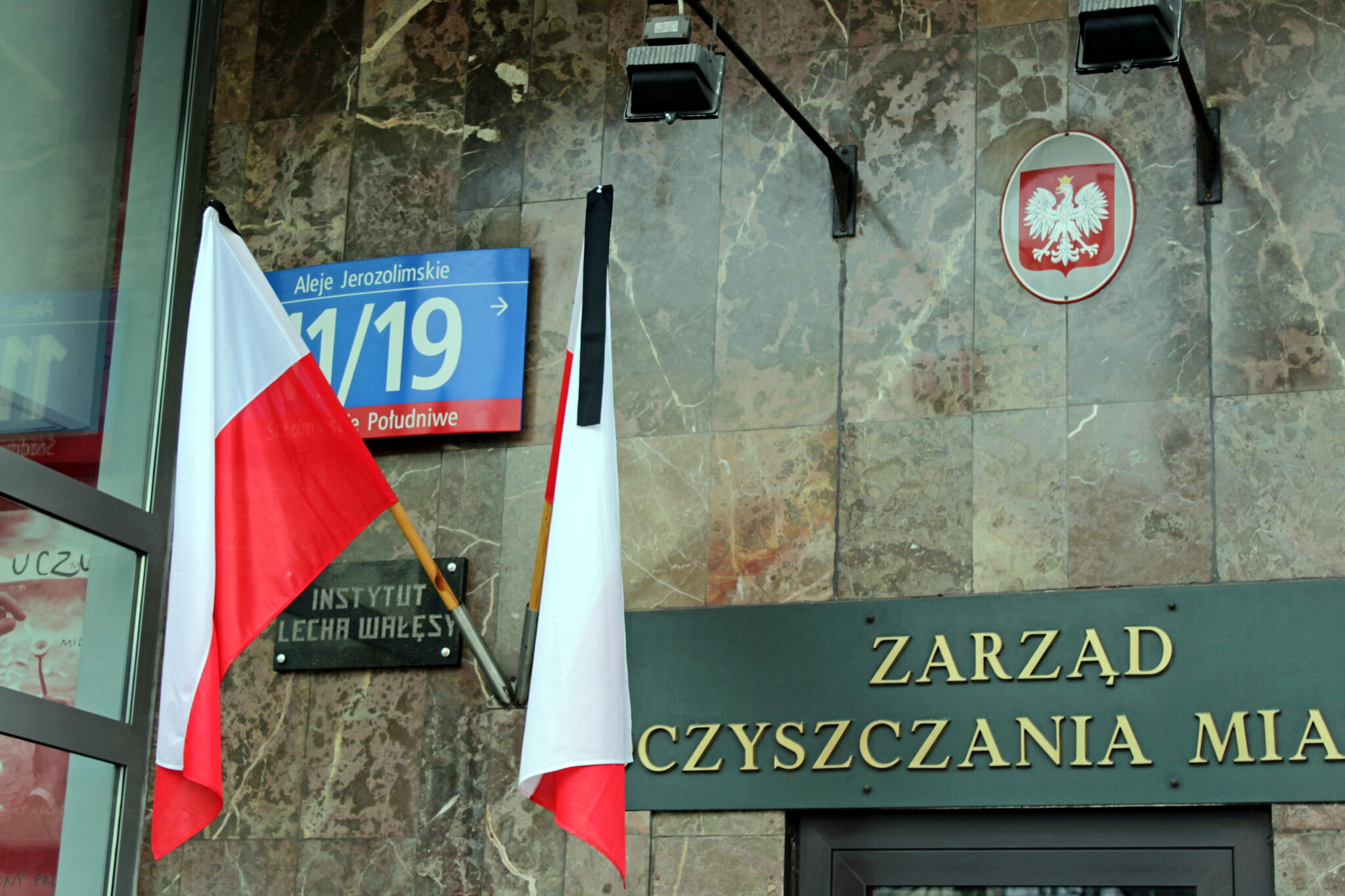
Former headquarters of the Institute

== Chairman ==
- Piotr Gulczyński – since 2000 to 2014
- Mieczysław Wachowski – since 29 September 2014 to 21 September 2016
- Jerzy Stępień – since 21 September 2016 to 29 October 2017 (Stępień resigned after media published Institute's financial audit)
- Adam Domiński – since 29 October 2017
