= Elżbieta Kossecka =

Polish physicist

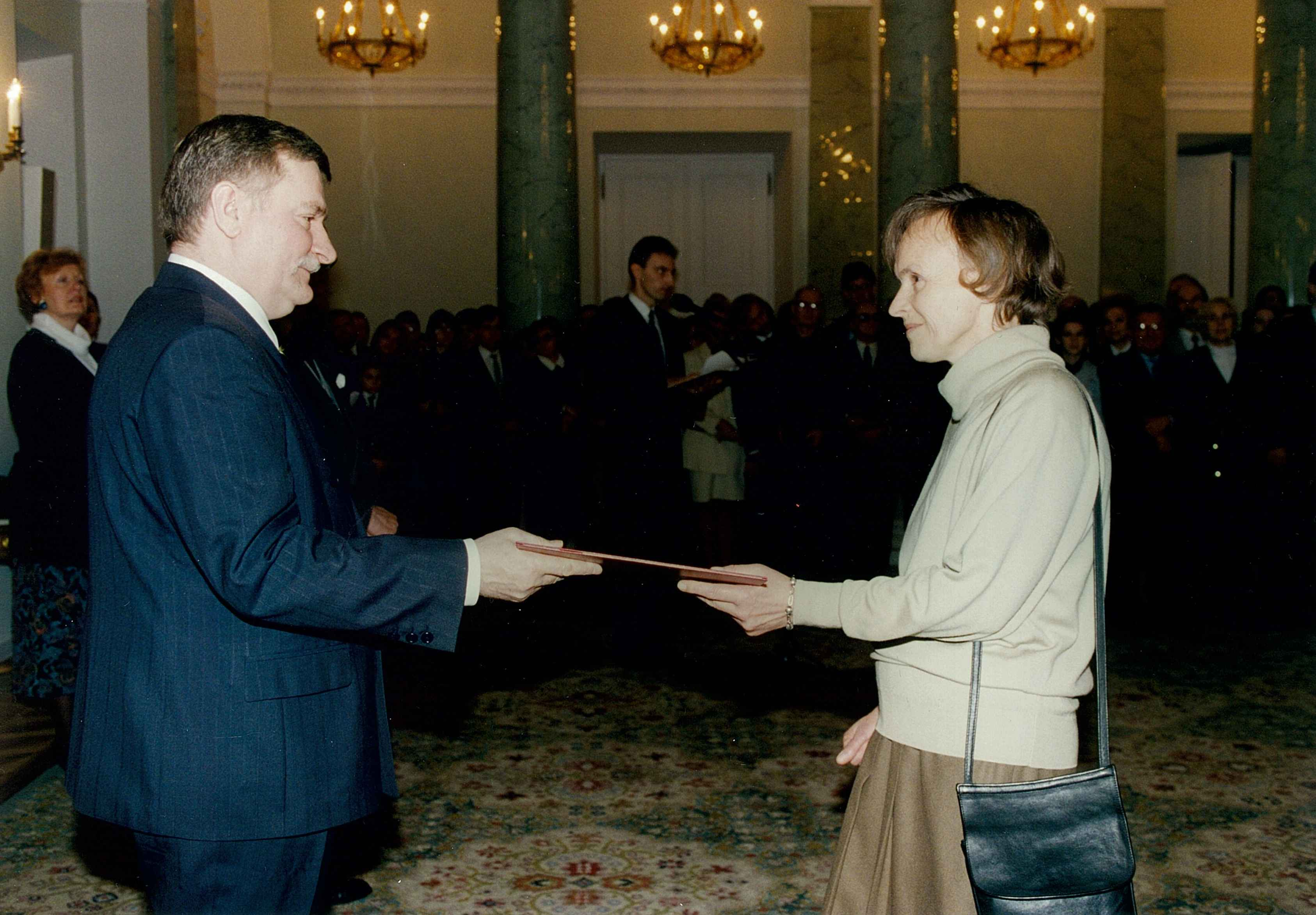
- Elżbieta Kossecka receives a diploma of professor from President Lech Wałęsa
- Born: Elżbieta Sulimierska; 13 December 1940; Warsaw, Poland
- Education: University of Warsaw
- Children: 5
- Awards: Gold Cross of Merit
- Scientific career
- Fields: Analytical mechanics, building science
- Workplaces: University of Warsaw; Polish Academy of Sciences

Elżbieta Kossecka (born 13 December 1940) is a Polish physicist. She is a professor of technical sciences and a researcher at the Institute of Fundamental Technological Research, Polish Academy of Sciences.

== Education and career ==
A graduate of the University of Warsaw, she graduated from the Faculty of Mathematics and Physics in 1962, obtaining a master's degree in theoretical physics. After a one-year internship at the Institute of Theoretical Physics, the University of Warsaw, she worked for two years as an assistant at the Department of Mathematical Methods of Physics. In 1965, she started working at the Institute of Fundamental Technological Research, Polish Academy of Sciences (IFTR PAS), where she worked successively as a senior assistant, assistant professor, associate professor and professor. In 1969 she obtained the doctoral degree (thesis topic: Theory of dislocation lines in a continuous medium). In 1974 she obtained the postdoctoral degree (subject: Mathematical theory of defects). In 1994 she received the title of professor. Head of the Laboratory of Defect Theory at IFTR PAS in the years 1978–1979, head of the Laboratory of Building Thermal Control (1988–1996), deputy director of the Helio-Ecostructures Center (1992–1997), head of the Laboratory of Structures and Environment Modeling (1996–2007), head of the Department of Eco-Building Engineering (2007–2010). In 2019 (since 2011) professor emeritus of IFTR PAS.

== Research contributions ==
The subject of the research work of Elżbieta Kossecka in the IFTR PAS in the years 1965–1985 included problems of solid mechanics related to fracture mechanics, falling within the scope of the theory of discrete defects, such as dislocations, disclinations and cracks. In later years, however, these were the issues of the theory of heat transfer falling within the building science, and analysis of the climate characteristics of Poland in terms of its impact on energy consumption for heating and air conditioning of buildings and the possibility of using energy from renewable resources. A co-author of many of her scientific papers was Jan Kośny, her Ph.D. student when he was a lecturer at the Technical University of Rzeszów, who later worked at Oak Ridge National Laboratory Buildings and Materials Group and then at the Fraunhofer Center for Sustainable Energy Systems CSE (US); from August 2019 he works at the University of Massachusetts in Lowell. Their joint work concerned, in particular, influence of internal structure of building walls on their dynamic thermal properties and energy consumption for exploitation purposes, and multi-dimensional heat transfer through complex building envelope assemblies in hourly energy simulation programs. They developed the so-called equivalent wall method in which a complex dynamic assembly, such as a wall with a thermal bridge, is represented by a 1D multi-layered assembly that has equivalent thermal characteristics and may be used as its substitute in building design energy simulations. Their later works concerned, among others, methods for the optimization of the minimum test time during hot-box experiments, and applications of phase-change materials (PCMs) in building envelopes.

In 1991 she was awarded the Gold Cross of Merit.

== Personal life ==
In 1965 she married Józef Kossecki. They had five children: Anna, Maria, Stefan, Paweł, and Jadwiga.
