= Polish Society of War Veterans =

Polish Veterans association

Polish Society of War Veterans and Former Political Prisoners (Polish: Związek Kombatantów RP i Byłych Więźniów Politycznych) created in April 1990 (in place of ZBoWiD), is an official and the largest Polish Veterans association.

Membership may be granted to any Polish citizen who was an active duty member of the Polish military (including partisan, self-defence units, and Polish Underground State) in or during the war, campaign, or conflict, as well as to all survivors of German concentration camps and pro-Soviet political imprisonment in the communist era. The constitution also requires members to have not been discharged under any conditions other than honourable.

Current president of the Association is Colonel Henryk Strzelecki. Its headquarters are located in Warsaw at Aleje Ujazdowskie in the historic Rembieliński Palace. Society of War Veterans is an umbrella organisation with 43 regional chapters across Poland, as well as 2364 clubs. The Central Office publishes a monthly magazine called Polsce Wierni (Poland's Faithful).
