= The Warsaw Voice =

English-language newspaper in Poland

- Format: A4
- Founded: 1988
- Language: English
- Headquarters: Warsaw
- Circulation: 10,500
- Website: warsawvoice.pl

Warsaw Voice: Polish and Central European Review, commonly shortened to The Warsaw Voice, is an English-language newspaper printed in Poland, concentrating on news about Poland and its neighbours. It was the first and, for the first few years of its history, the only English-language newspaper published in Poland. It has been described as "the most authoritative English-language newspaper" published in Warsaw. In 2026, it suspended publication until further notice. It was created by Polish TV-presenter and journalist Andrzej Jonas, who served as editor-in-chief with Slawomir Majman as deputy editor in chief.

First released in October 1988, it is a general news magazine with sections on political, economic, social and cultural news and with opinions sections. The printed edition has a circulation of 10,500.

After the fall of communism in 1989, many Western European companies started to expand heavily in or come to Poland, such as the American Coca-Cola, the French retail chains Carrefour and Auchan, German Volkswagen and the Dutch Philips, ING Bank, Unilever and the wholesaler Makro. As a result, the expat community in Warsaw and surroundings quickly grew to some tens of thousands. The Voice caters specially to their needs, offering primarily economic, political and cultural news and background. From 1992 until 1998 The Voice had one foreign correspondent, Arthur Graaff in Amsterdam, because of the leading Dutch investments in Poland.

In 2016, the magazine switched from monthly to quarterly publication. The most recent issue to date was the Winter 2025 edition. On 13 March 2026, it suspended publication entirely pending “new decisions (…) regarding the future formula.” Updates to the website and the daily newsletter “Poland’s Voice daily” have also been discontinued as of this date.

== Print characteristics ==
A4 format (230mm x 297 mm), 40 pages, minimum 24 pages in full colour.
