= Chalin, Kuyavian-Pomeranian Voivodeship =

Chalin
- Village
- Location within Poland
- Coordinates: 52°41′N 19°23′E
- Country: Poland
- Voivodeship: Kuyavian-Pomeranian
- County: Lipno
- Gmina: Dobrzyń nad Wisłą
- Population: 530

Chalin [ˈxalin] is a village in the administrative district of Gmina Dobrzyń nad Wisłą, within Lipno County, Kuyavian-Pomeranian Voivodeship, in north-central Poland.
