= List of Mil Moscow Helicopter Plant aircraft =

This is a list of aircraft produced by Mil Moscow Helicopter Plant, a Russian aircraft manufacturer.

== Types ==
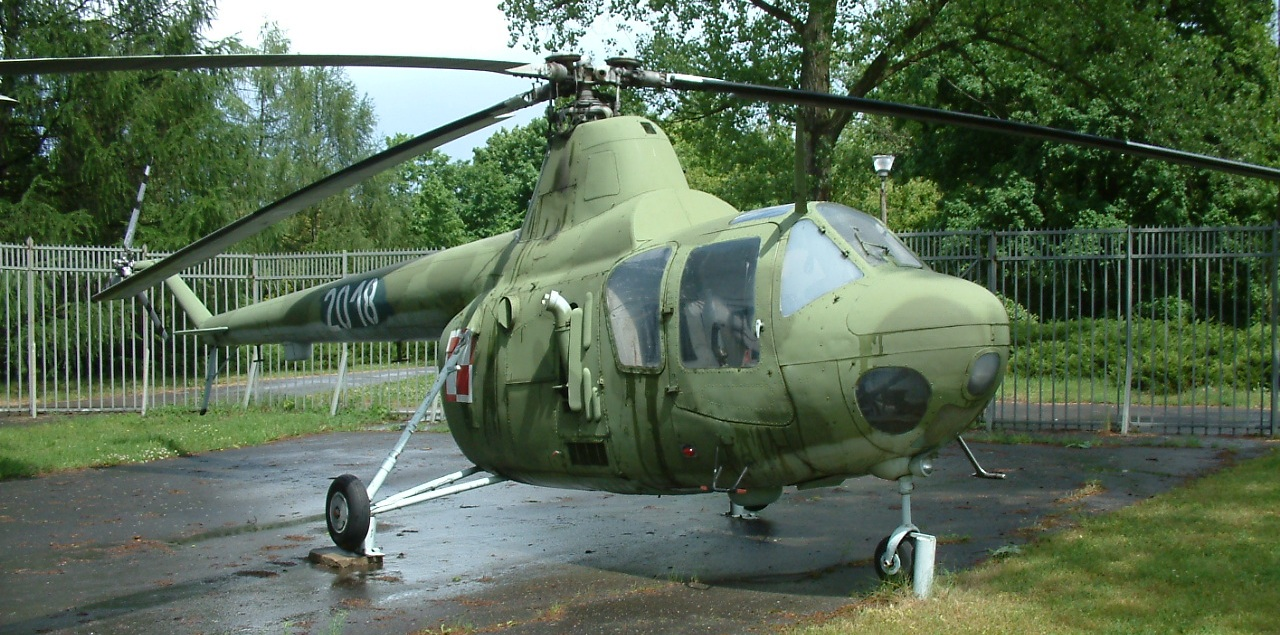
Mil Mi-1

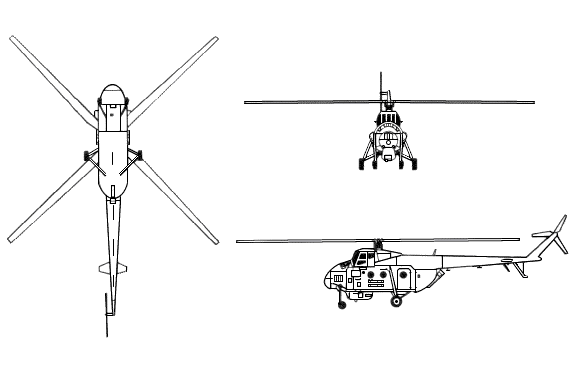
MIL Mi-4 HOUND

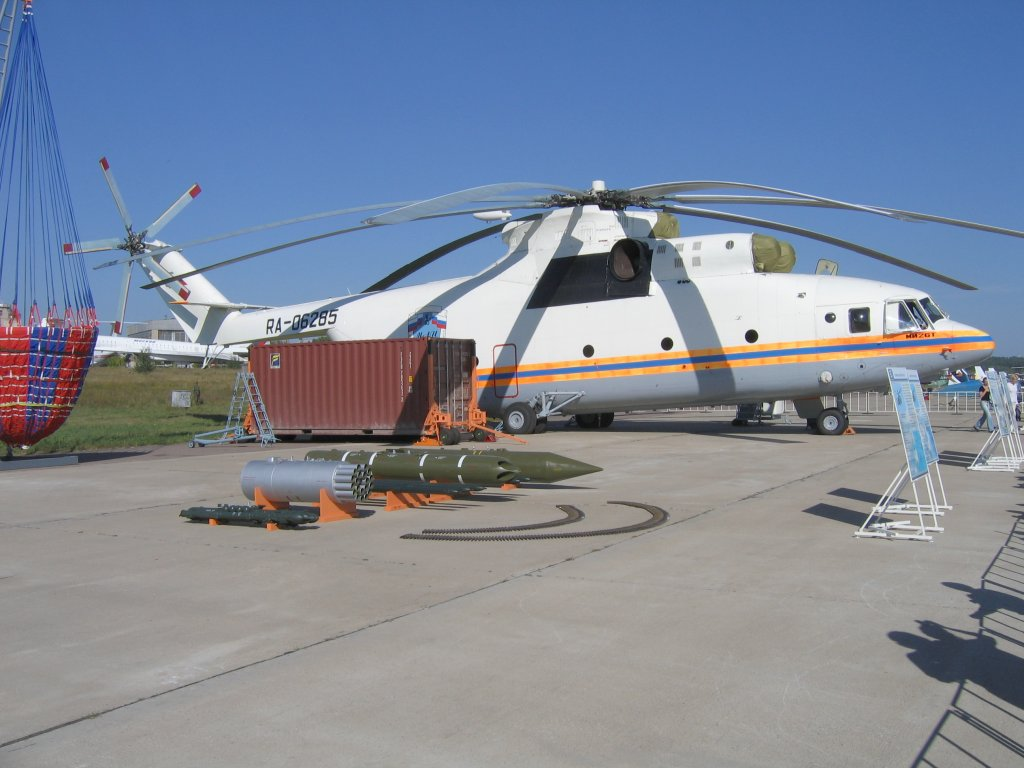
EMERCOM Mi-26T

- Mil Mi-1, 1948 - Light multi purpose helicopter. NATO reporting name Hare.
- Mil Mi-2, 1965 - Light multi purpose helicopter. NATO reporting Name Hoplite.
- Mil Mi-3 (1954), 1954 - Mi-1 with four-blade rotor
- Mil Mi-3, 1964 - experimental light-utility helicopter developed from the Mi-2
- Mil Mi-4, 1955 - Transport and submarine-hunting-helicopter. NATO reporting name Hound.
- Mil V-5, 1959 - medium single-turboshaft transport helicopter
- Mil Mi-6, 1957 - Heavy transportation helicopter. NATO reporting name Hook.
- Mil V-7, 1959 - experimental four-seat helicopter
- Mil Mi-8, 1961 - Multi-purpose helicopter. NATO reporting name Hip.
  - List of Mil Mi-8/17 operators
- Mil Mi-9, airborne command post and relay variant of Mi-8
- Mil Mi-10, 1962-1963 - Skycrane. NATO reporting name Harke.
- Mil V-12 (1951), 1951 - designation for Mi-4 prototype.
- Mil V-12, 1967 - experimental heavylift helicopter, 2 prototypes built, world's largest helicopter ever. NATO reporting name Homer.
- Mil Mi-14, 1978 - Anti-submarine warfare helicopter. NATO reporting name Haze.
- Mil V-16, 1967 - heavy cargo/transport helicopter project
- Mil Mi-17, 1974 - Transportation helicopter. NATO reporting name Hip-H. Known as Mi-8M in Russia.
  - List of Mil Mi-8/17 operators
- Mil Mi-18, 1979 - prototype lengthened version of Mi-17
- Mil Mi-19, - Airborne command post variant of Mi-17
- Mil Mi-20, 1966 - super light helicopter; mockup only
- Mil Mi-22 Hook-C - Military command support variant of Mi-6
- Mil Mi-22, 1965 - planned, unbuilt
- Mil Mi-24, 1978 - Heavy combat helicopter. NATO reporting name Hind.
  - Mil Mi-24 variants
- Mil Mi-25, - Export version of Mi-24
- Mil Mi-26, 1977 - Heavy transport helicopter, world's heaviest helicopter. NATO reporting name Halo.
- Mil Mi-27 - Proposed airborne command post variant of Mi-26
- Mil Mi-28, 1984 - Combat helicopter. NATO reporting name Havoc.
- Mil Mi-30, 1972 - tiltrotor aircraft project
- Mil Mi-32, 1982 - three rotor super heavy helicopter project
- Mil Mi-34, 1986 - Light helicopter. NATO reporting name Hermit.
- Mil Mi-35 - Export version of Mi-24
- Mil Mi-36, light multipurpose helicopter project
- Mil V-37, 2012 - planned cargo/passenger helicopter
- Mil Mi-38, 2000 - multi purpose helicopter
- Mil Mi-40, 1983 - Projected armed transport version of Mi-28, unbuilt
- Mil Mi-42, 1985 - Projected assault/transport NOTAR helicopter, unbuilt
- Mil Mi-44, utility helicopter based on the Mi-34; in development
- Mil Mi-46, 1992 - Projected passenger/cargo/flying crane helicopter
- Mil Mi-52, projected four-seat light utility helicopter
- Mil Mi-54, 1992 - multirole helicopter (Project)
- Mil Mi-58, 1995 - Projected passenger helicopter based on the Mi-28, unbuilt
- Mil Mi-60 MAI, 2001 - Two-seat light helicopter designed in collaboration with Moscow Aviation Institute, unbuilt
- Mil Mi-115, planned, unbuilt
- Mil Mi-171, export version of Mi-17
- Mil Mi-172, civil passenger version of Mi-17
- Mil Mi-234, proposed version of Mi-34 powered by VAZ-4265 piston engines
- Mil Mi-X1, proposed high-speed helicopter
- Mil Mi-PSW 2015 - experimental high-speed helicopter based on the Mi-24

== See also ==
- List of military aircraft of the Soviet Union and the CIS
