= Mil Mi-22 =

The Mil Mi-22 designation was assigned to two unrelated helicopter designs by Mil Moscow Helicopter Plant:

- an unbuilt transport helicopter developed from the Mil Mi-2 in 1965
- an airborne command post developed from the Mil Mi-6 which entered service in 1975
