= Mil Mi-46 =

Type of aircraft

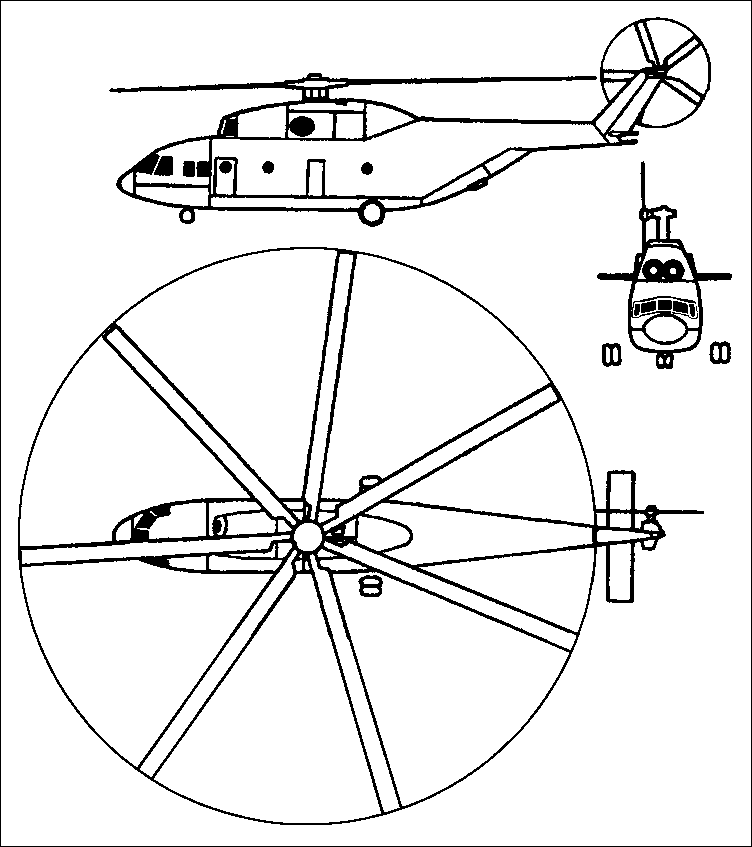
Depiction of the Mi-46

The Mil Mi-46 is a projected Mil twin-turboshaft helicopter intended for passenger, cargo, and flying-crane roles, first announced in the summer of 1992. The design was split into two versions: Mi-46T, a transport variant, and Mi-46K, a flying-crane variant.

== Development ==
Preliminary work toward what became the Mi-46 dates to 1982, with formal design work launched in 1990 at the request of the Soviet Ministry of Civil Aviation. The aircraft was meant to fill a gap left by the retirement of the Mi-6 in 1980: operators found the larger Mi-26 less economical for the 9–10 tonne loads the Mi-6 had typically carried. The programme drew on design and testing experience from the Mi-26 and Mi-38.

A suitable turboshaft engine in the 7,500–8,000 hp class was not available from any Russian or foreign manufacturer, and this became the project's central obstacle. The proposed solution was the Aviadvigatel D-215V, rated at approximately 7,600 hp and derived from the PS-90A turbofan core.

Series production plans were shelved because of insufficient state budget financing. As of 2005, Mil Moscow Helicopter Plant JSC still listed the Mi-46 among helicopters under design. On 25 August 2007, a model of the Mi-46 was publicly displayed at a press conference marking the plant's 60th anniversary, alongside the Mi-58. The design was also shown that year at Aviation Expo China 2007 in Beijing, where a Mil representative said the company was seeking international partners, including Chinese firms, with a target of first deliveries by 2020. No prototype has been built, and the programme's status remains unclear.

== Design ==
The Mi-46 followed a conventional single-rotor layout, with a seven-blade main rotor and five-blade tail rotor. Both variants shared the same fuselage nose, flight deck, powerplant, and dynamic components.

=== Mi-46T ===
The Mi-46T was the passenger/cargo transport version, built similar to the Mi-26, with a takeoff weight just over half that of the Mi-26, intended to replace the aging Mi-6. Its general configuration resembled the Mi-26, with non-retractable tricycle landing gear carrying twin wheels on each unit, few windows in the hold, and a rear-loading ramp and doors. The engines were mounted above the hold, forward of the main rotor driveshaft, with an oil cooler positioned ahead of the main gearbox. The Mi-46T required two new-type Aviadvigatel turboshaft engines, each rated at 5,590 kW (7,495 shp).

=== Mi-46K ===
The Mi-46K was the flying-crane version, intended to replace the Mi-10K, and was designed similarly to it, with a crane-styled construction featuring stub wings and long tripod-braced landing gear. A glazed gondola for a second pilot, facing rearward behind the front fuselage pod, allowed the crew to control the helicopter during loading and unloading, with the sling cable positioned directly under the main rotor driveshaft. Development of the Mi-46K was hindered by the lack of a suitable engine; it required two unspecified turboshaft engines rated at 5,965 kW each.
