= Mil Mi-60 MAI =

Unbuilt 2000s Russian helicopter project

Mi-60 MAI

General information
- Type: Light utility helicopter
- National origin: Russia
- Manufacturer: Mil
- Designer: Marat Nikolayevich Tishchenko
- Status: Unrealised project

The Mil Mi-60 MAI (Cyrillic: Миль Ми-60 МАИ) was a joint project between Mil and the Moscow Aviation Institute to develop a light utility helicopter. A mockup was displayed at the MAKS 2001 air show, where Russian aerospace journal Aviatsiya i Kosmonavtika (Авиация и космонавтика; "Aviation and Space") described it as a "little brother" to the Mil Mi-34.

The Mi-60 MAI was intended to fulfil a range of general aviation activities, including pilot training, agricultural work, police and firefighting duties, resource monitoring, aerial photography, and tourism. Domestic demand in Russia for such an aircraft was estimated at around 400–600 units. No Russian manufacturer was producing a lightweight helicopter such as this, and foreign aircraft were unsuitable for Russian conditions.

The design was further presented at the 1997 International Aviation Forum in Moscow, and the World Salon of Inventions in Brussels the same year. It won a gold medal at the latter event.

== Design ==
The Mi-60 MAI was a conventional design for a light helicopter, with a pod-and-boom fuselage, a three-bladed main rotor, two-bladed tail rotor, and a skid undercarriage with rear wheels on each skid. The pilot and a single passenger were to sit side-by-side in an extensively-glazed, enclosed cabin with dual controls.

At different stages of development, a variety of powerplants were proposed, including:

- one 120-kilowatt (160 hp) Lycoming O-320-B2C piston engine
- one 150-kilowatt (200 hp) Aviadvigatel D-150 wankel engine
- one 145-kilowatt (194 hp) Textron Lycoming HIO-360-F1AD piston engine
- one 177-kilowatt (237 hp) VAZ-426 wankel engine
- two 84.6-kilowatt (113.5 hp) Rotax 914F piston engines.
- two 103-kilowatt (138 hp) LOM M332A piston engines

These were to be located inside the fuselage, behind the cabin, with power transmitted to the rotor through V-belts. In the twin-engine versions, the engines were to be located side-by-side. One criterion for engine selection was favouring engines that could run on automotive-grade petrol. This would allow the aircraft to operate in regions with less well-developed infrastructure. The twin-engine variants were expected to be able to continue to fly on only one engine.

Construction was to make extensive use of composite materials.

== Development ==
Initial funding for the project came from the Russian Ministry of Education. Development started in 1993 and technical work was finished the following year. In 1997, the Russian Army became a sponsor, hoping to use the Mi-60 MAI as a helicopter trainer.

Construction of a mockup commenced at the Kazan helicopter factory in 2000. It was displayed the following year at the MAKS air show, and production was planned to start the same year. Production would have taken place at the Rostvertol factory in Rostov-on-Don As of 1998, an estimated $30 million was still required to put the aircraft into production.

Development work on the program ended in 2001, although it was still included in the Russian federal aviation plan for 2002–10. As of 2013, no examples had been constructed.

== Specifications (as designed, with VAZ engine) ==
Data from Jackson 2007, p.497, except as noted.

General characteristics

- Crew: one pilot
- Capacity: 1 passenger
- Length: 7.370 m (24 ft 2 in) (fuselage, including tail rotor)
- Height: 2.286 m (7 ft 6 in)
- Max takeoff weight: 1,300 kg (2,866 lb)
- Powerplant: 1 × VAZ-426 piston engine, 177 kW (237 hp)
- Main rotor diameter: 10.00 m (32 ft 10 in)

Performance

- Maximum speed: 225 km/h (140 mph, 121 kn)
- Cruise speed: 185 km/h (115 mph, 100 kn)
- Range: 400 km (250 mi, 220 nmi)
- Service ceiling: 5,500 m (18,000 ft)
- Rate of climb: 142 m/s (28,000 ft/min)

== Notes ==
=== Bibliography ===
- "МАИ+Миль новый сверхлегкий" [MAI+Mil new ultralight]. Вертолёт. No. 2. Kazan: Omega Research Centre. 1998. pp. 16–19.
- Mikheev, Vadim Rostislavovich (1998). МВЗ им. М. Л. Миля 50 лет [The Moscow Helicopter Plant named for M. L. Mil turns 50]. Moscow: Lyubimaya.
- Mikheev, Vadim Rostislavovich (2007). МВЗ имени М. Л. Миля [The Moscow Helicopter Plant named for M. L. Mil]. Moscow: Polygon.
- Nikolskiy, Mikhail (2001). "Первый российский авиасалон XXI бека" [The First Russian Air Show of the 21st Century]. Авиация и космонавтика. No. 9. Moscow: Techinform. pp. 1–10.
- Gordon, Yefim; Komissarov, Sergey (2013). Unflown Wings: Soviet and Russian Unrealised Aircraft Projects 1925-2010. Manchester: Créey Publishing.
- Jackson, Paul, ed. (2007). Jane's All the World's Aircraft 2007-08 (98th ed.). London: Jane's Publishing Group.
