= Mil Mi-22 (1965) =

Unrealised 1960s Soviet project for a military transport helicopter

Mi-22

General information
- Type: transport helicopter
- National origin: Soviet Union
- Manufacturer: Mil
- Status: Unrealised project

History
- Developed from: Mil Mi-2

The Mil Mi-22 (Cyrillic Миль Ми-22) was a 1960s Soviet project to develop a military transport helicopter. It was a development of the Mil Mi-2, but did not enter production when the Soviet military selected the Mil Mi-24 for this role instead. The Mi-22 designation which had become unused was later re-applied to a completely unrelated design, an airborne command post variant of the Mil Mi-6. This first Mi-22 concept was a Soviet attempt to create a helicopter in the Bell UH-1 class.

== Design and development ==
In 1964, motivated by a perception that the Soviet military was losing interest in helicopters, Mil began work on improvements to the Mi-2 design, and built mockups exploring two different paths. One of these led to the development of the Mil Mi-3. The other, designated V-20 (Cyrillic В-20), was to have a fuselage stretched by inserting a plug, and equipped with a wide, sliding door. The Mi-2's three-bladed main rotor and wheeled undercarriage were to be replaced by a four-bladed rotor and skid undercarriage. Calculations showed that the Mi-2's Klimov GTD-350 engines would be insufficient for the new design, and Mil started to study a range of other gas turbines for the V-20's powerplant, including the GTD-550, GTD-10, and Glushenkov GTD-3, plus also the American Continental T65 and French Turbomeca Astazou. Rather than being an improvement of the Mi-2, the V-20 had become a practically new design.

Mil founder Mikhail Leontyevich Mil and designer Marat Nikolayevich Tishchenko unsuccessfully attempted to secure support from the Soviet Ministry of Aviation Industry to develop the design, but in 1965, the Soviet military became interested in the GTD-10 powered version of the V-20 as a helicopter capable of deploying a motorised rifle squad. The designation Mi-22 was applied at this point.

Development proceeded as far as testing the new four-bladed rotor fitted to a Mi-2 in 1971, but a complete prototype had not yet been built before the Mi-24 was selected to fulfil the same requirement in the early 1970s. In actual service, the Mi-24 was hardly ever deployed as a troop carrier, negating the purpose for which the Mi-22 had been developed.

== Specifications (as designed) ==
General characteristics

- Capacity: 10 troops
- Gross weight: 4,300 kg (9,480 lb)
- Powerplant: 1 × GTD-10A turboshaft, 700 kW (940 shp)

== Notes ==
=== Bibliography ===
- Gordon, Yefim; Komissarov, Dmitriy (2000). "Лёгкий многоцелевой вертолёт Ми-2" [Light, multipurpose helicopter Mi-2]. Авиация. No. 7. Moscow: Pilot. pp. 10–31.
- Komissarov, Dmitriy; Kotlobovsky, Alexander; Rusetsky, Milos; Khaustov, Andrey (2004). "Вертолёт с двойным гражданством" [Helicopter with dual citizenship]. Авиация и Время. No. 6. Kyiv: Aerohobi. pp. 4–24, 38–41.
- Mikheev, Vadim Rostislavovich (1998). МВЗ им. М. Л. Миля 50 лет [The Moscow Helicopter Plant named for M. L. Mil turns 50]. Moscow: Lyubimaya.
- Mikheev, Vadim Rostislavovich (2001). "Сорок лет в небе: О вертолёте Ми-2" [Forty years in the sky: About the Mi-2 helicopter]. Крылья Родины. No. 4. Moscow: KR-media. pp. 5–7.
