= MI-7 =

MI-7, M:I 7, MI7, MI 7, or another variant may mean:

- MI7, British Military Intelligence Section 7
- Mil Mi-7, a.k.a. Mil V-7
- Michigan's 7th congressional district
- M-7 (Michigan highway)
- Mission: Impossible – Dead Reckoning Part One, a 2023 spy-thriller film starring Tom Cruise
- M.I.7 (album), a 2026 album by M.I.A.
