= MI-20 =

MI-20 can refer to:

- Mil Mi-20, Soviet helicopter
- M-20 (Michigan highway)
