= Mil V-5 =

V-5

General information
- Type: Medium transport helicopter
- National origin: USSR
- Manufacturer: Mil

The Mil V-5 was a project in the late 1950s for a medium single-turboshaft transport helicopter, probably a variant for the Mil Mi-2. The engine was a 300 kW Klimov GTD-350 turboshaft engine. The project never reached production.
