= Mil Mi-32 =

A proposed Soviet helicopter

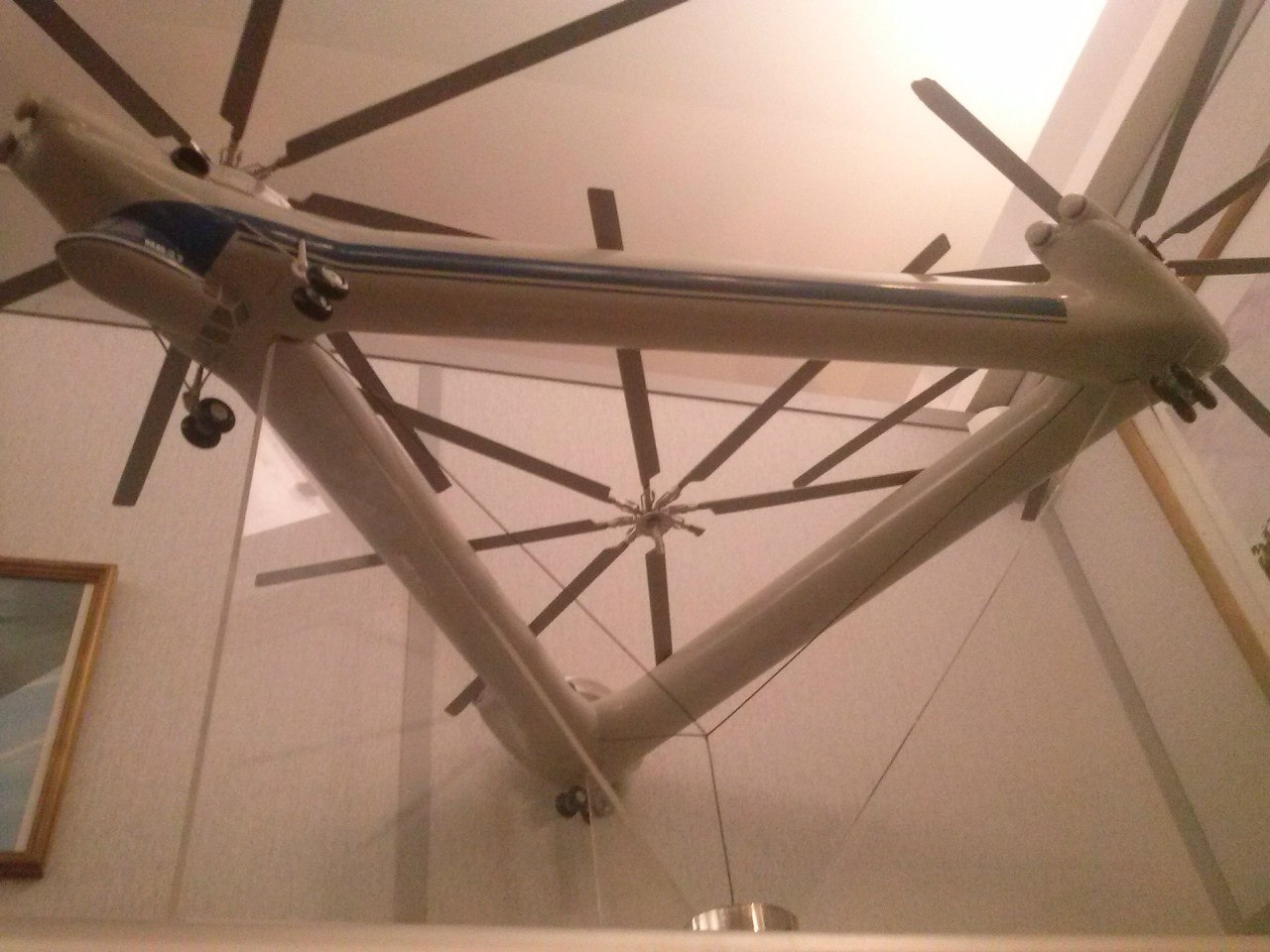
- Mil Mi-32

General information
- Type: Three-rotor cargo helicopter
- National origin: Soviet Union
- Designer: Mil Moscow Helicopter Plant

The Mil Mi-32 (Russian: Ми-32) was a 1982 design study for an ultra-heavy, triple-rotor flying cargo helicopter proposed by the Mil Moscow Helicopter Plant in the Soviet Union. It was proposed to transport outsized military and civil payloads weighing up to 55 metric tons. The aircraft was intended for operations in vast, infrastructure-poor regions like Siberia.

== Design ==
The Mil Mi-32 was projected to have a takeoff weight of 146 tons, a maximum speed of 230 km/h, and a maximum range of 1200 km. However, due to the dissolution of the USSR, it was never built.

== See also ==
- List of rotorcraft
- List of Mil Moscow Helicopter Plant aircraft
