= Mil Mi-22 (1975) =

1975 Soviet military helicopter used as airborne command post

Mi-22

General information
- Type: airborne command post
- National origin: Soviet Union
- Manufacturer: Mil

History
- Introduction date: 1975
- Developed from: Mil Mi-6

The Mil Mi-22 (Cyrillic Миль Ми-22) is a helicopter that was developed for use as an airborne command post for the Soviet Army in the mid 1970s. In the early 1970s, Mil had built the Mi-6AYA or Mi-6VzPU as modifications of the basic Mi-6 transport helicopter for use in similar roles. The modifications from these earlier aircraft entered serial production under the designation Mi-22, which was reused from an unbuilt development of the Mi-2 from 1965. The Mi-22 was in service with the Soviet Air Force from the late 1970s, through the dissolution of the Soviet Union and then with the Russian Air Force until the early 2000s.

== Design ==
Based on the Mi-6 airframe, the Mi-22 is a large helicopter of conventional design, with a pod-and-boom fuselage and a single, five-bladed main rotor. It has large stub wings mounted on the fuselage sides and fixed, tricycle undercarriage. The major differences between the Mi-6 transport and Mi-22 command and control aircraft are internal, but the Mi-22 can be externally distinguished by a large aerial mounted on the tail boom. Individual aircraft featured numerous other differences in antenna placement, depending on the communications equipment used by the units to which they were assigned. Such were the external similarities to Mi-6 transports that command post aircraft were often given a red stripe of paint to make them identifiable to troops.

== Development ==
The Soviet military recognised the potential for a helicopter to provide forward control of ground forces as early as 1961. That year, a Mil Mi-4 transport helicopter was modified as an "air command post" (Russian: Воздушный Командный Пункт, vozdushnyy komandnyy punkt), designated Mi-4VKP. The weak powerplant of this helicopter limited the success of the concept, but the much larger and more powerful Mi-6 offered more potential.

The first attempt to create a command and control variant of the Mi-6 began in late 1972 by a new, specially created "Equipment Management Department" (ORO, from Russian Отделом Руководства Оборудованием, Otdelom Rukovodstva Oborudovaniyem) at Air Force Repair Plant 535 in Konotop.

A team led by D. M. Melnikov modified a Mi-6, adding a communications centre and an officer's lounge to create the Mi-6VKP. Despite its designation, the Mi-6VKP could not perform its function while airborne and had to land to deploy equipment. The ORO modified 36 Mi-6s from the Rostov factory this way.

The Mi-6VKP was followed by a version that could carry out similar command-and-control functions, but from the air. The centrepiece of this aircraft was a communications suite named Yakhont (Яхонт, an archaic name for ruby or sapphire), from which it gained its designation Mi-6AYA (Ми-бАЯ). It was also known as the Mi-6VzPU (Ми-6ВзПУ, for Воздушный Пункт Управления, vozdushnyy punkt upravleniya, "air control post"). This version was ordered for mass production as the Mi-22, carried out in Rostov. The Yakhont unit combined and miniaturised much of the electronics that had been fitted to the Mi-6KVP, making use of solid-state technology to do so.

Mi-22s entered service in 1975. Some were assigned to mixed air regiments, alongside regular, transport Mi-6s and other types of helicopters, fixed-wing aircraft, and heavy trucks. It was replaced in production by the even more capable Mil Mi-27

== Specifications (Mi-6VKP) ==
Data from Prikhodchenko 1997, p.145

General characteristics

- Crew: 6 (flight crew) plus 2 officers and 3 NCOs (command post crew)
- Length: 41.739 m (136 ft 11 in)
- Height: 9.86 m (32 ft 4 in)
- Empty weight: 34,580 kg (76,236 lb)
- Max takeoff weight: 44,500 kg (98,106 lb)
- Powerplant: 2 × TVD D-25V turboshafts, 4,100 kW (5,500 shp) each
- Main rotor diameter: 35 m (114 ft 10 in)

Performance

- Maximum speed: 280 km/h (170 mph, 150 kn)
- Cruise speed: 250 km/h (160 mph, 130 kn)
- Range: 600 km (370 mi, 320 nmi)
- Service ceiling: 4,000 m (13,000 ft)

== Notes ==
=== Bibliography ===
- Maraev, Rostislav V. (1999). "От расцвета до заката" [From dawn to dusk]. Авиация и Время. No. 1. Kyiv: Aerohobi. pp. 12–15, 24–29.
- Mikheev, Vadim Rostislavovich (1999). "Русский размер" [Russian size]. Авиация и Время. No. 1. Kyiv: Aerohobi. pp. 6–11.
- Moroz, Sergey (9 December 2016). "Штаб фронта уходит в небо: воздушные командные пункты Миль Ми-6А ВКП, Ми-6АЯ (Ми-22) и Ми-27" [Forward headquarters takes to the skies: air command posts Mil Mi-6A VKP, Mi-6AYA (Mi-22) and Mi-27]. Наука и Техника. Archived from the original on 26 December 2016.
- Prikhodchenko, Igor (1997). "Воздушные командные пункты на базе вертолета Ми-6" [Airborne command posts based on the Mi-6 helicopter]. АвиО. No. 6. Kharkiv: NPF Sintal'D. pp. 143–45.
- Ruzhitskiy, Yevgeniy Ivanovich (1997). Вертолёты [Helicopters]. Vol. 1. Moscow: Victoria.
