= Mil Mi-44 =

Soviet and Russian helicopter project

General information
- Type: Utility helicopter
- Manufacturer: Mil
- Status: Under development

The Mil Mi-44 is a utility helicopter in development by the Mil Design Bureau (OKB) and based on the Mi-34. It was planned to replace the Mi-34 and become the Soviet Union's primary utility helicopter. The project is still under development, delayed due to the 2022 Russian Invasion of Ukraine.

== Design and development ==
In the mid-1980s, the Omsk OKB started developing the TV-O-100, a light 650 hp engine designed specifically for the Mi-44. The engine would increase the aircraft's take-off weight to 1,800 kilograms (4,000 lb) and allow a maximum speed of up to 260 kilometres per hour (160 mph). Studies conducted by Mil in 1986 and 1987 concluded that replacing the Mi-34's original M-14V26 piston engine with the TV-O-100 gas turbine engine would require changing the airframe. The resultant new airframe mockup incorporated many changes, which included relocating the fuel tank to under the gearbox and relocating the stabilizer to the keel beam in the tail.

Early users determined that two 400 hp power plants would be optimal. The most acceptable option to meet the requirement was the TVlD-450 engine, which would make the aircraft more agile. In 1988, Mil proposed a draft Mi-44 with two 450 hp TVlD-450 engines. The design has undergone some minor changes since prototype development. With the engine configuration still being considered, the project is still incomplete.

== Specifications ==
Data from

General characteristics

- Crew: 2
- Powerplant: 2 × TBL-450 turboshaft engine, 340 kW (450 shp) each
- Main rotor diameter: 10.75 m (35 ft 3 in)
- Main rotor area: 90.774 m^{2} (977.08 sq ft)

Performance

- Maximum speed: 260 km/h (160 mph, 140 kn)
