= Mil V-7 =

1959 Soviet experimental helicopter

V-7
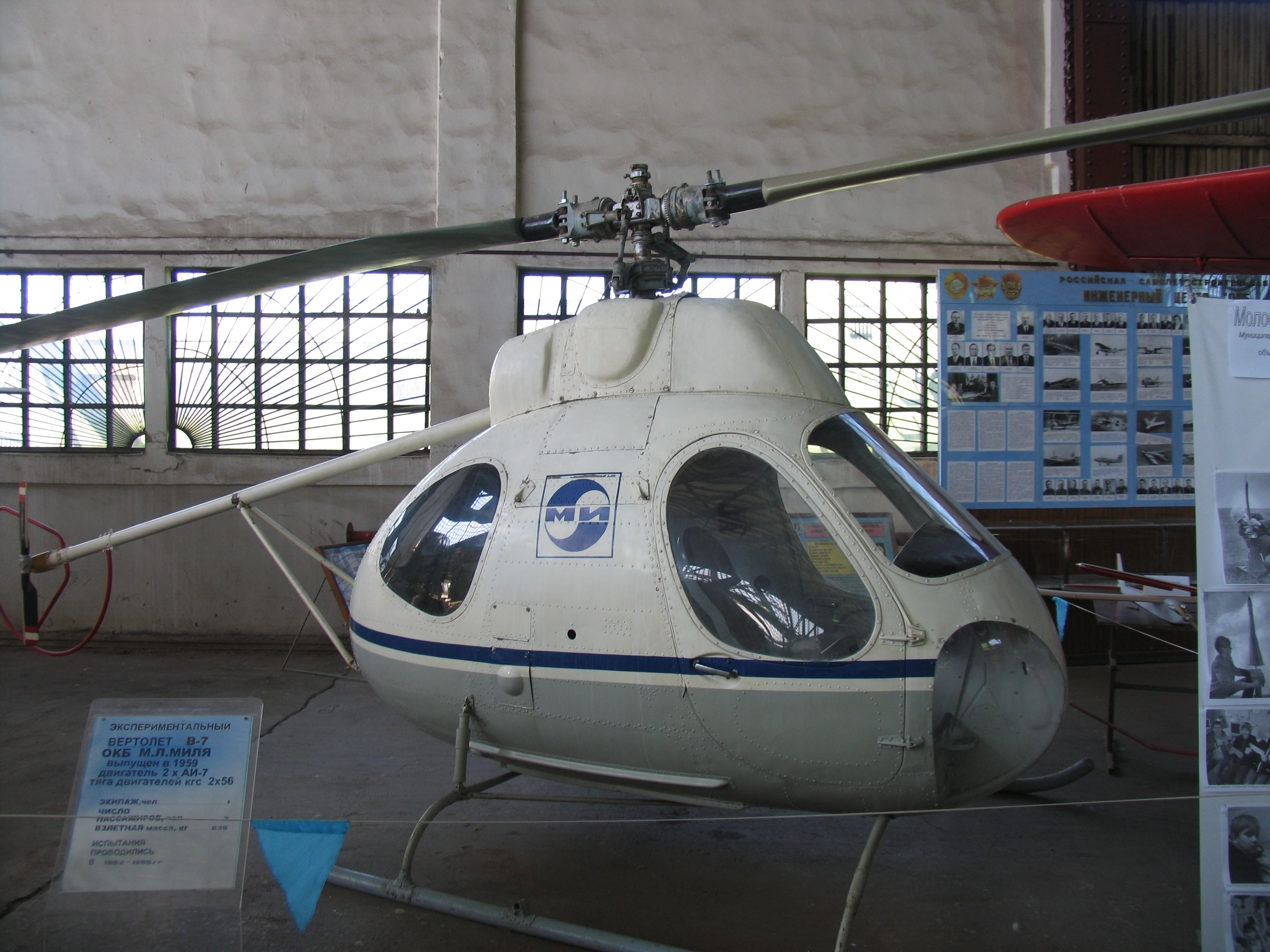

General information
- Type: Experimental tip-drive helicopter
- Manufacturer: Mil
- Status: Experimental
- Number built: 1

History
- Introduction date: 1959
- First flight: 1959

The Mil V-7 was an experimental four-seat helicopter with AI-7 ramjets at the tips of the two rotor blades. It had an egg-shaped fuselage, skid undercarriage, and a two-bladed tail rotor on a short tubular tail boom. Four aircraft were built in the late 1950s, but only one is known to have flown, with only the pilot aboard.

== Specifications ==
Data from The Osprey Encyclopaedia of Russian Aircraft 1875–1995

General characteristics

- Crew: 1
- Capacity: 3 passengers
- Empty weight: 730 kg (1,609 lb)
- Gross weight: 835 kg (1,841 lb)
- Powerplant: 2 × Ivchenko AI-7 ramjets, 0.549 kN (123.5 lbf) thrust each
- Main rotor diameter: 11.6 m (38 ft 1 in)

== See also ==
- List of experimental aircraft
