= Mil Mi-34 =

Russian light helicopter

Mi-34
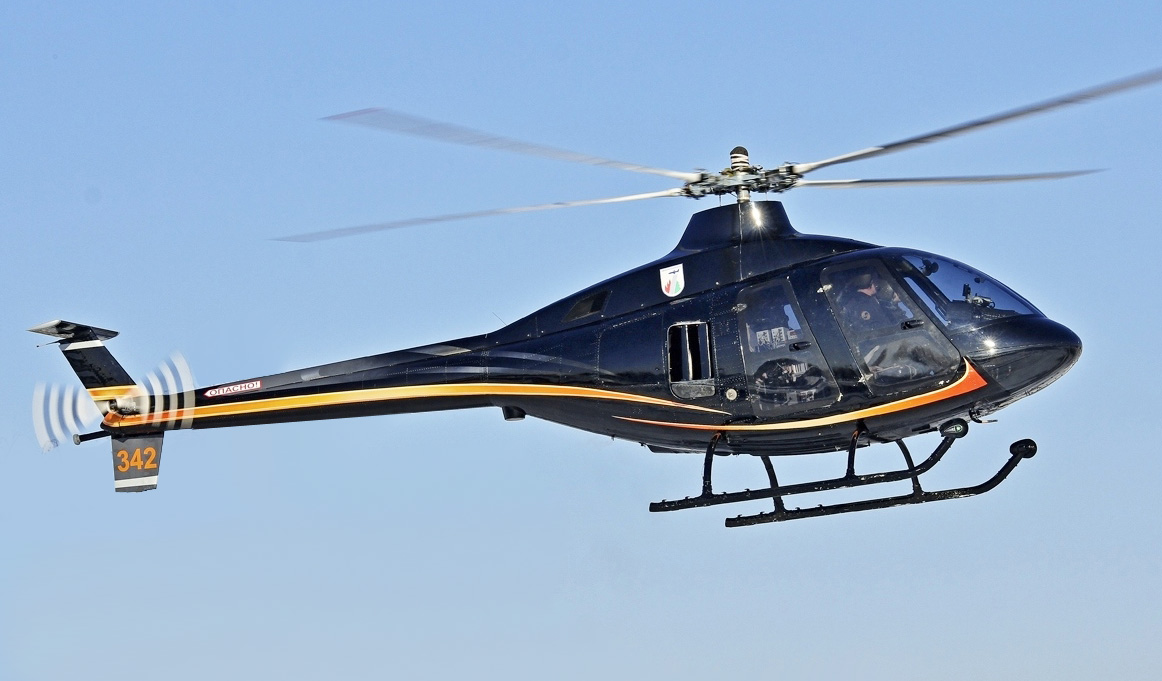
- A Mil Mi-34

General information
- Type: Helicopter
- National origin: Soviet Union / Russia
- Manufacturer: Mil Helicopters
- Status: out of production (new re-engined prototype has been produced at 2024)
- Number built: 27 (+1 new prototype at 2024)

History
- Manufactured: 1986–2011, 2024-present
- Introduction date: 1993
- First flight: 17 November 1986

The Mil Mi-34 (NATO reporting name: Hermit) is a light helicopter designed by the Mil Moscow Helicopter Plant in either a two or four seat configuration for utility and training. It was first flown on 17 November 1986 and introduced at the Paris Air Show in 1987. The Mi-34 entered production in 1993, and is capable of performing aerobatic manoeuvres, including rolls and loops.

A new domestic engine version, Mil Mi-34M1 made its first hovering flight in October 2024. It uses the Russian made VK-650V turboshaft engine instead of the previous Radial engine.

== Development ==
=== Further development ===
In 2023, Russian Helicopters made the decision to restart production of the Mi-34, proposing the Mi-34M1 using the newly developed Klimov VK-650 light turboshaft engine. The engine was planned to also be used on other Russian helicopters such as the Kamov Ka-226 and Kazan Ansat. On 15 October 2024, hover tests of a prototype Mi-34M1 equipped with a VK-650V engine took place. The first flight took place on 30 December 2025 at the Mil Moscow Helicopter Plant. The flight lasted ten minutes and was flown by test pilot Sergey Barkov.

== Variants ==
- Mi-34S (Note: Jane's (2004–05) indicates that the Mi-34S is the base design and that prior to 1999, all marketing literature referred to the Mi-34 using the Mi-34C designation. The S or C suffixes were used to indicate the aircraft's certification by the Interstate Aviation Committee. The Russian word for certified (Russian: Сертифицированные) begins with the Cyrillic C, which is romanized as the letter S.) – four seat production model powered by a 239 kW (325 hp) Vedeneyev (VOKBM) M-14V-26V nine-cylinder, air-cooled, radial engine mounted sideways in the fuselage, and equipped with modern avionics. A few aircraft were purchased by the Moscow police.
- Mi-34S2 "Sapsan" – turbine version of the Mi-34. It will be able to accommodate up to 4 passengers and the first deliveries are planned by the end of 2011. It will be powered by Turbomeca Arrius-2F
- Mi-34L – proposed version powered by a 261 kW (350 hp) Textron Lycoming TIO-540J piston engine. None built.
- Mi-34P Patrulnyi (English: patrol) – Police patrol version for Moscow Mayor Office.
- Mi-34A – Luxury version, intended to be powered by an Allison 250-C20R turboshaft engine. None built.
- Mi-34M1 – New prototype, powered by Russian made VK-650V turboshaft engine.
- Mi-34UT – trainer with dual control.
- Mi-34V or Mi-34VAZ or Mi-234 – proposed version powered by two VAZ-4265 rotary piston engines.
- Mi-44 – proposed development with TV-O-100 engine and refined aerodynamics. A mockup was built in 1987.

== Operators ==
=== Military operators ===
Bosnia and Herzegovina

- Armed Forces of Bosnia and Herzegovina

Nigeria

- Nigerian Air Force

== Specifications (Mi-34S) ==
Data from Jane's All The World's Aircraft 2000–2001

General characteristics

- Crew: 1 or 2
- Capacity: 2 pax
- Length: 11.415 m (37 ft 5 in) overall

8.71 m (29 ft) fuselage

- Height: 2.75 m (9 ft 0 in)
- Empty weight: 950 kg (2,094 lb)
- Gross weight: 1,280 kg (2,822 lb) normal

1,100 kg (2,425 lb) aerobatic

- Max takeoff weight: 1,450 kg (3,197 lb)
- Fuel capacity: 176 L (46 US gal; 39 imp gal) / 128 kg (282 lb)
- Powerplant: 1 × Vedeneyev M-14V-26V 9-cylinder air-cooled radial piston engine, 239 kW (321 hp) or 1 × VK-650V Turboshaft engine, 485 kW (650 hp) for Mi-34M1
- Main rotor diameter: 10 m (32 ft 10 in)
- Main rotor area: 78.7 m^{2} (847 sq ft)

Performance

- Maximum speed: 210 km/h (130 mph, 110 kn)
- Cruise speed: 170 km/h (110 mph, 92 kn)
- Best climb speed: 90 km/h (56 mph; 49 kn)
- Range: 356 km (221 mi, 192 nmi) with maxfuel at 500 m (1,600 ft) and 5% reserve
- Service ceiling: 4,000 m (13,000 ft) *Hover ceiling OGE: 900 m (3,000 ft)
- g limits: +3
- Disk loading: 18.4 kg/m^{2} (3.8 lb/sq ft)
- Power/mass: 0.165 kW/kg (0.100 hp/lb)

== See also ==
Aircraft of comparable role, configuration, and era

- Bell Helicopter 206 – (United States, Canada)
- Cicaré CH-14 Aguilucho – (Argentina)
- Enstrom 280
- Kazan Ansat
- MD Helicopters MD 500 – (United States)
- PZL SW-4 – (Poland)
- Robinson R44
- Vertical Hummingbird – (United States)
