= Mil Mi-20 =

Mi-20

General information
- Type: multipurpose helicopter
- Manufacturer: Mil

The Mil Mi-20 was a small multipurpose transport helicopter built to replace the Mil Mi-1 in the mid-1960s. The helicopter was built for many roles, including transport, cargo, agricultural, training, and even light armed escort or gunship roles. In gunship role, it could carry Falanga or Malyutka anti-tank rockets on four to six outboard pylons, or two UB-16-57 rocket pods.

In 1966, MVZ built a full-scale mockup of the aircraft with a 355 hp Turbomeca "Oredon-III" single-turboshaft engine and tricycle-type landing gear. Later, in 1972, MVZ built another mockup, but with a TBG-11 hp engine type and a skid undercarriage. The helicopter did not attract many customers after the second mock-up and did not replace the Mil Mi-1. Because of this, further development of the aircraft was canceled.
