= Mikhail Mil =

Soviet helicopter designer (1909–1970)

- Михаил Миль
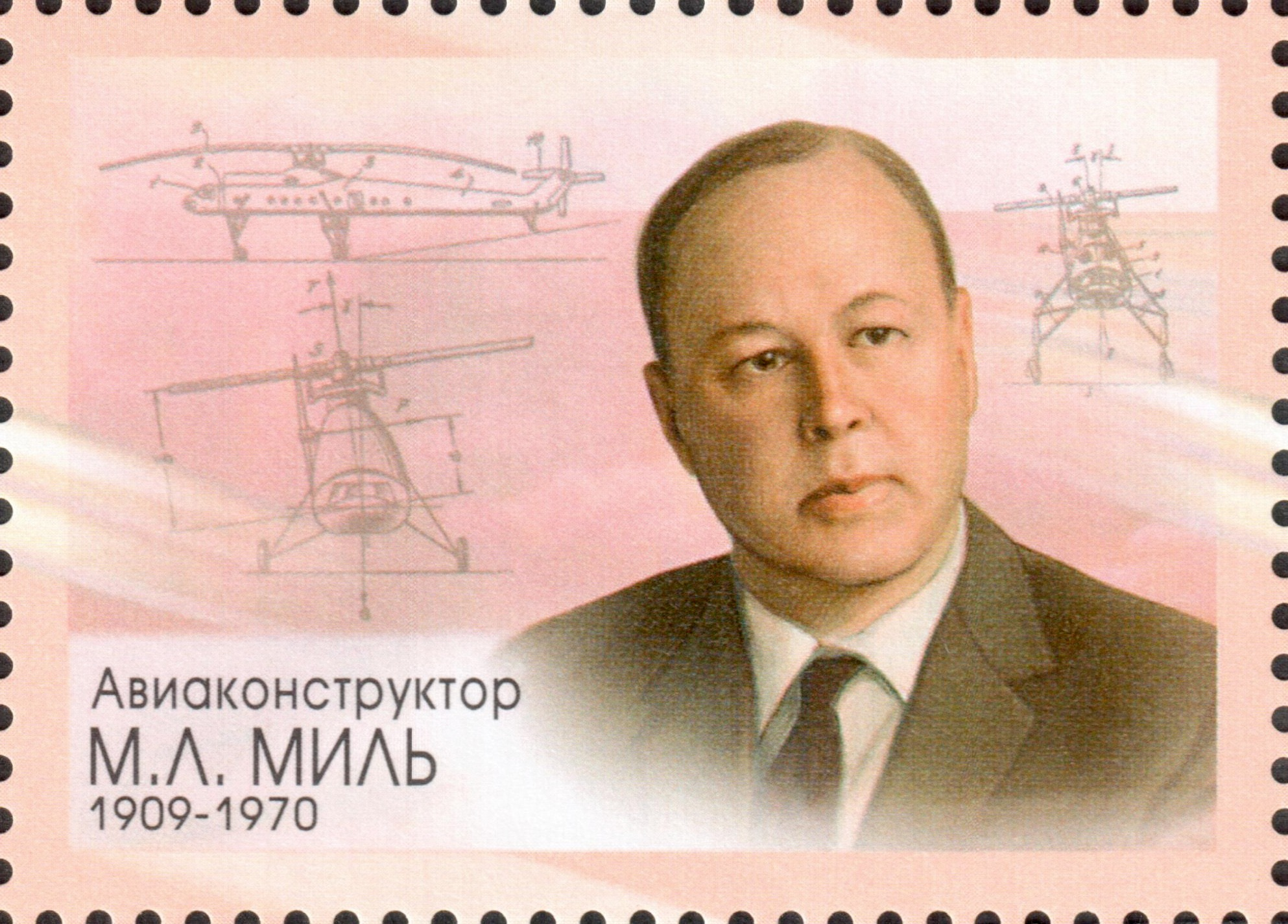
- Mil on a 1990 Russian commemorative postage stamp
- Born: Mikhail Leontyevich Mil; November 22, 1909; Irkutsk, Russian Empire
- Died: January 31, 1970 (aged 60); Moscow, Soviet Union
- Engineering career
- Discipline: Aerospace engineering
- Employer: Mil Moscow Helicopter Plant

Signature
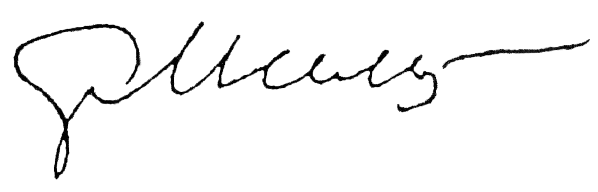

Mikhail Leontyevich Mil (Russian: Михаил Леонтьевич Миль; 22 November 1909 – 31 January 1970) was a Soviet and Russian aerospace engineer and scientist. He was the founder and general designer of the Mil Moscow Helicopter Plant.

== Biography ==
Mil was born to a Russian Jewish family in Irkutsk. His father was an employee of the Trans-Siberian Railway, and his mother was a dentist. His grandfather was a cantonist who had been drafted from Libava (today Liepāja), Latvia, and who settled in Siberia after 25 years in the Imperial Russian Navy.

At age 12 Mil won the first prize in a model glider competition. In 1926 he entered the Siberian Technological Institute in Tomsk; however, since there was no curriculum for aerospace engineering, he decided to transfer in 1928 to the Don Polytechnical Institute in Novocherkassk, where he was able to specialise in aviation. He married a fellow student, P.G. Rudenko, in 1932 and 4 daughters and a son followed.

After graduating from the institute in 1931, Mil began his career at TsAGI, too late to work under its original founder, Nikolay Zhukovsky. He specialised in the design of autogyros, and was an assistant to his future rival, Nikolai Kamov. With the start of World War II, Mil was drafted into the Red Army and fought on the Eastern Front in 1941 near Yelnya. In 1943 he was called back to continue research and development in improving the stability and control of combat aircraft. He completed his dissertations ("Candidate", 1943, PhD, 1945) and in 1947 headed the Helicopter Lab at TsAGI, which was later turned into the Moscow Helicopter Plant.

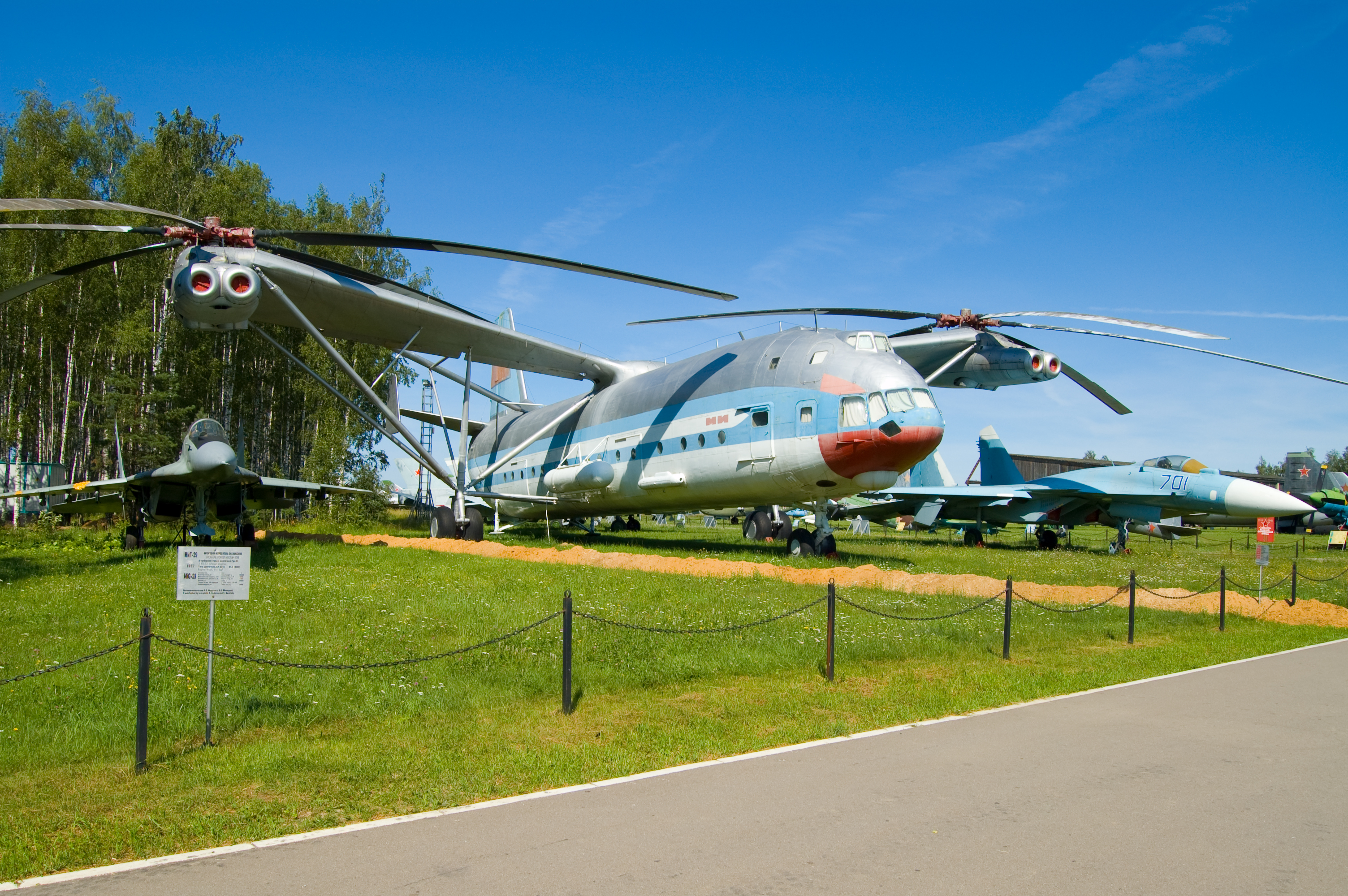
Mil V-12 at the Central Air Force Museum

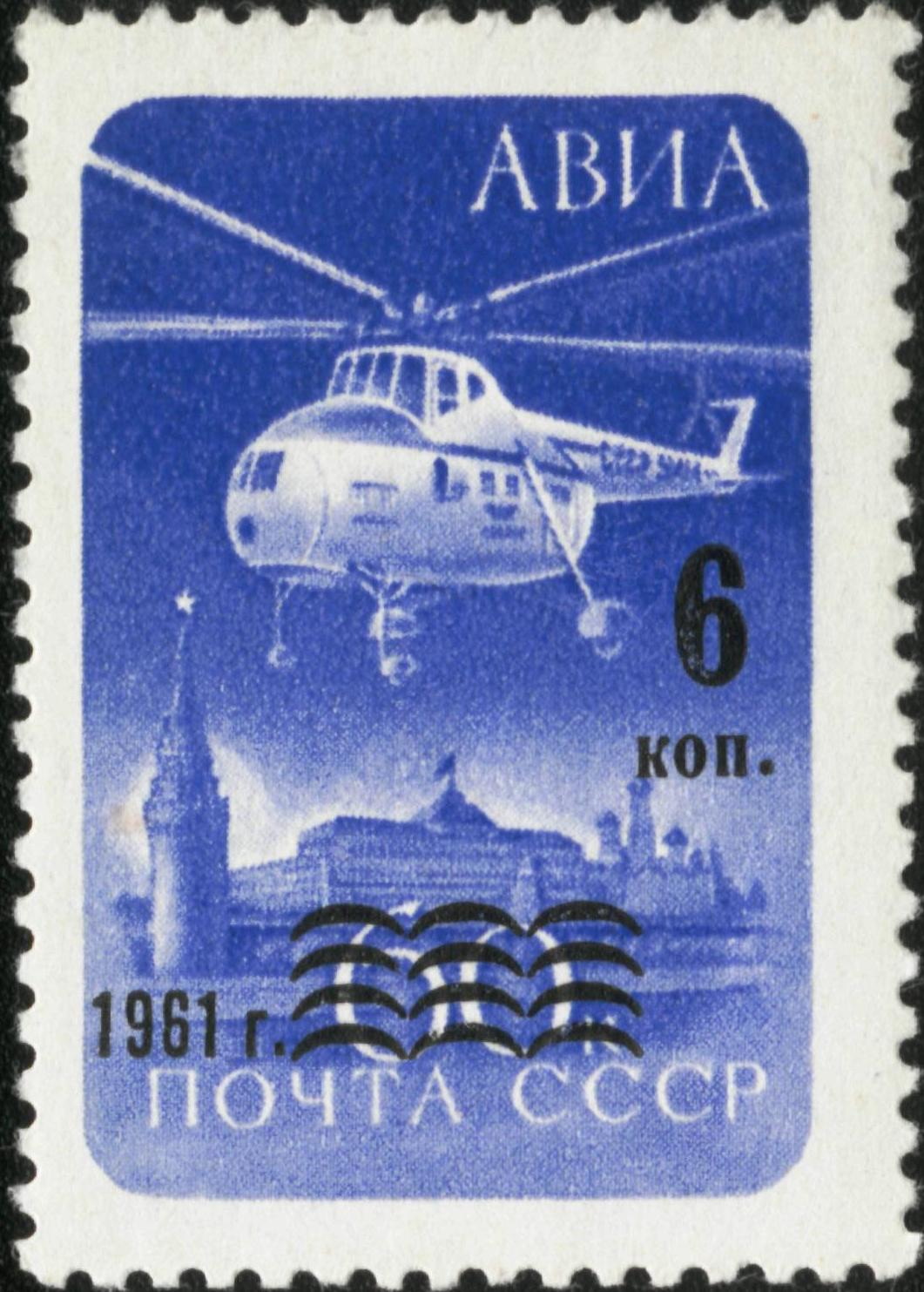
Mi-4 helicopter on the USSR stamp

Mil's creations won many domestic and international awards and set 69 world records. Most notably, the Mil Mi-4 won a gold medal in the Brussels International Exposition in 1958. In 1971, after his death, his Mil Mi-12 (production name of V-12 prototype) won the Sikorsky Prize as the most powerful helicopter in the world. Unlike his Soviet counterpart, Nikolai Kamov, Mil enjoyed great prestige due to his single-rotor helicopters, as Kamov used the co-axial rotor layout, which was more controversial.

He died in 1970 in Moscow after a long illness and was buried in Yudinskoe Cemetery in the outskirts of Moscow.

== Awards and honors ==
- Hero of Socialist Labour (1966)
- Three Orders of Lenin (1957, 1966, 1969)
- Order of the Patriotic War, 2nd class (1945)
- Order of the Red Banner of Labour (1959)
- Order of the Red Star (1944)
- Lenin Prize (1958)
- USSR State Prize (1968)
- Order of Polonia Restituta

== Trivia ==
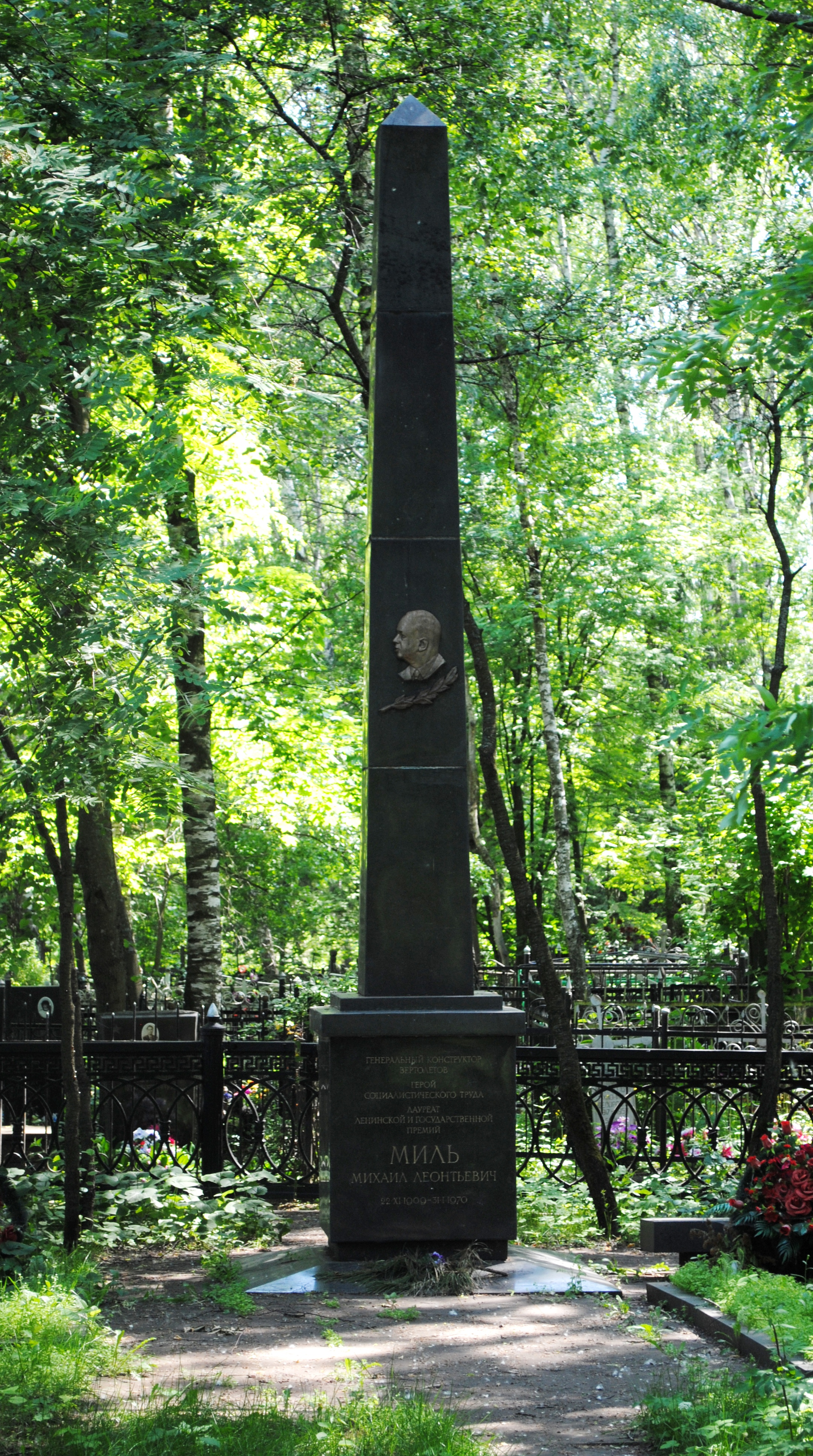
The grave of M. L. Mil at the Yudinsky cemetery

- On July 5, 2023, a monument to aircraft designers M. L. Mil and N. I. Kamov was unveiled in Irkutsk (architect Sergey Demkov).
- The National Helicopter Building Center is named in memory of Mikhail Mile and Nikolai Kamov ("NCV Miles and Kamov"). It was established in 2019 on the basis of JSC "Moscow Helicopter Plant named after M.L. Mil" and JSC "Kamov". The company is part of the Russian Helicopters holding company.
- State budgetary educational institution of the city of Moscow "School No. 1359 named after aircraft designer M.L. Mil" Date of establishment of the educational organization on September 1, 1993.
