= List of Mil Mi-8/17 operators =

The following nations currently operate (or formerly owned) Mi-8 and Mi-17 helicopters in civil or military roles:

== Military operators ==
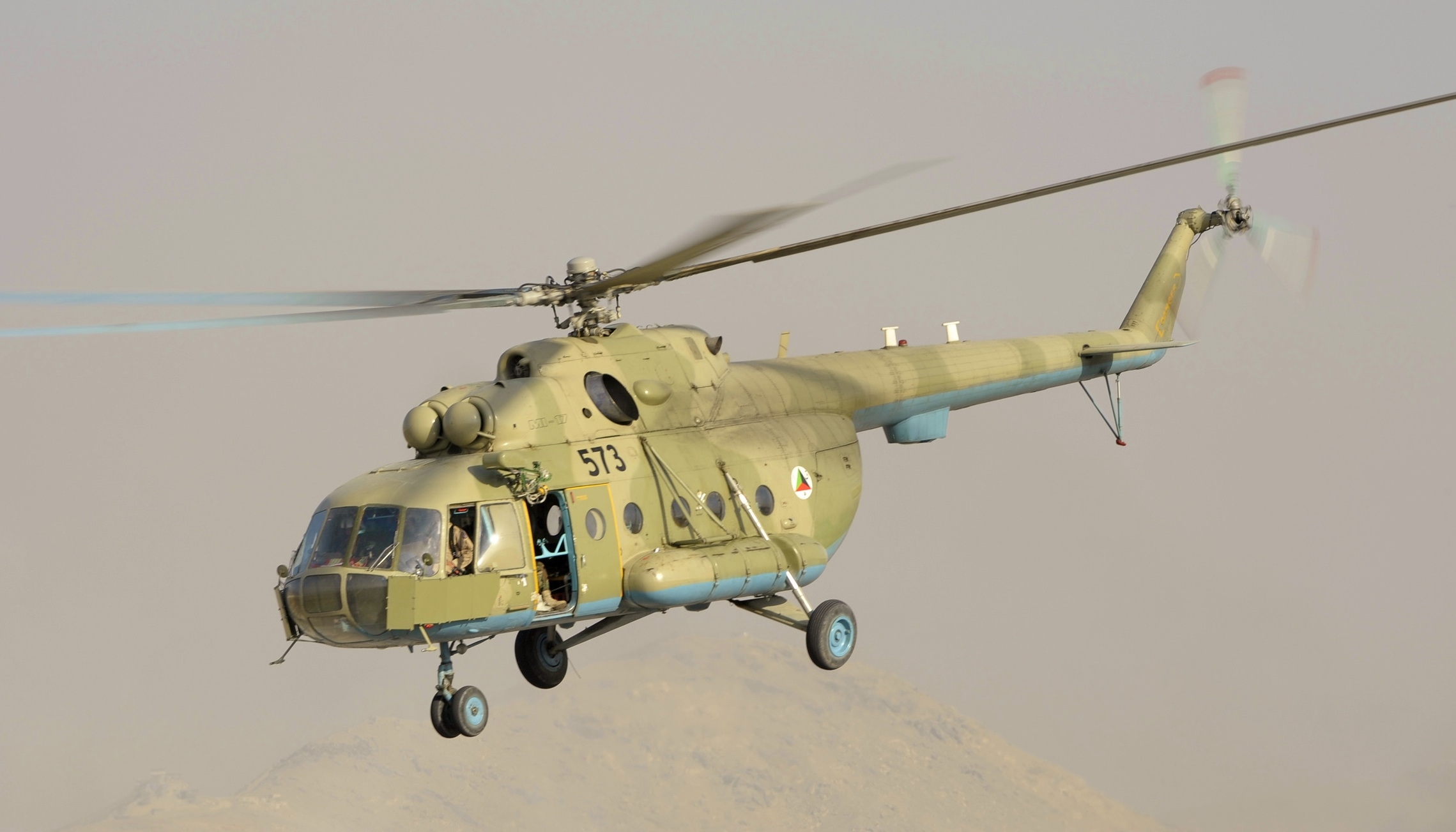
An Afghan Air Force Mi-17

=== Afghanistan ===
- Afghan Air Force

=== Algeria ===
- Algerian Air Force

=== Angola ===
- National Air Force of Angola

=== Armenia ===
- Armenian Air Force

=== Azerbaijan ===
- Azerbaijan Air Force

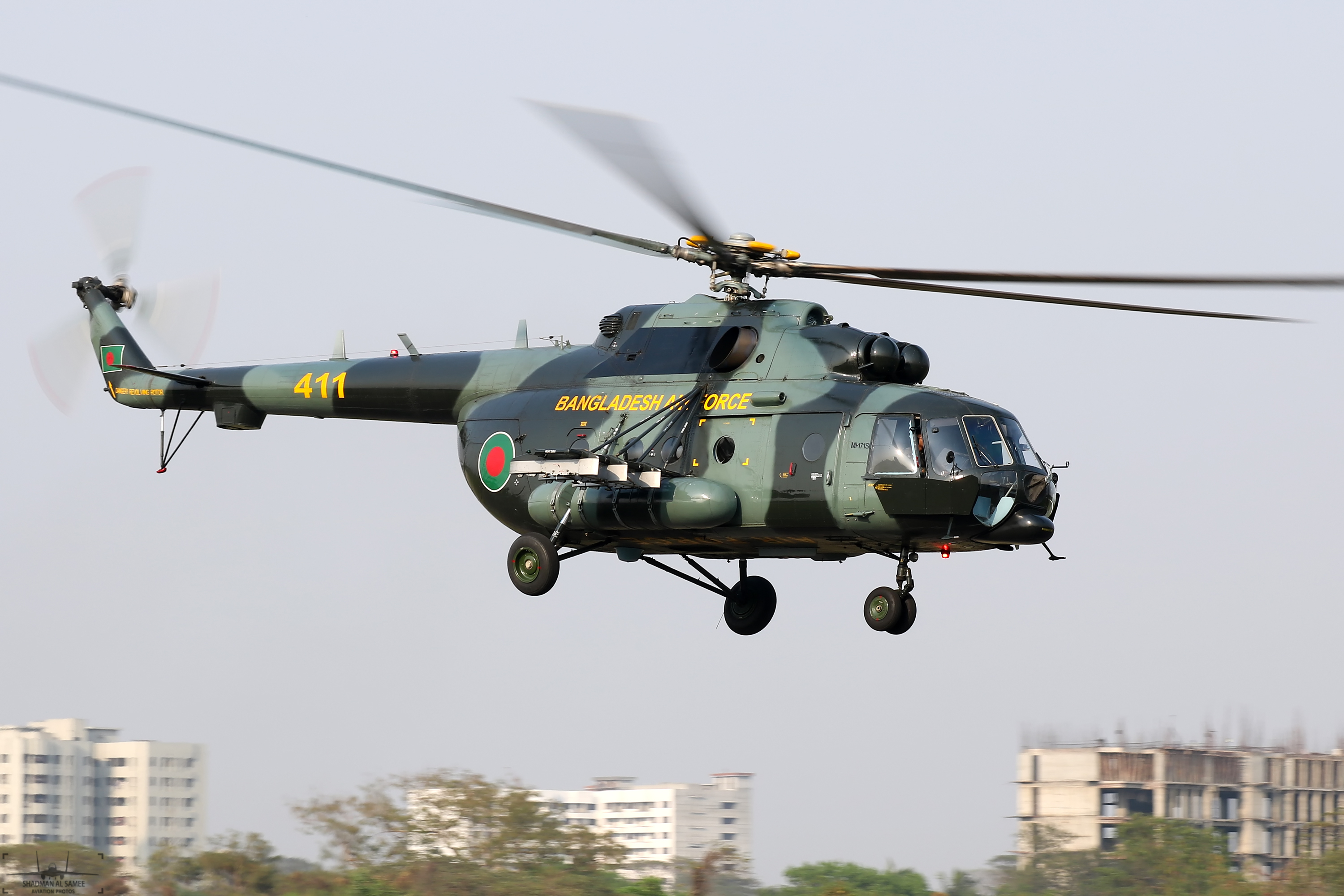
Bangladesh Air Force Mil Mi-171Sh

=== Bangladesh ===
- Bangladesh Air Force
- Bangladesh Army
- Border Guard Bangladesh

=== Belarus ===
- Belarus Air Force

=== Bhutan ===
- Royal Bhutan Army

=== Bosnia and Herzegovina ===
- Air Force and Anti-Aircraft Defence of Bosnia and Herzegovina

=== Bulgaria ===
- Bulgarian Air Force

=== Burkina Faso ===
- Burkina Faso Air Force

=== Cambodia ===
- Royal Cambodian Air Force

=== Cameroon ===
- Cameroon Air Force

=== Chad ===
- Chad Air Force

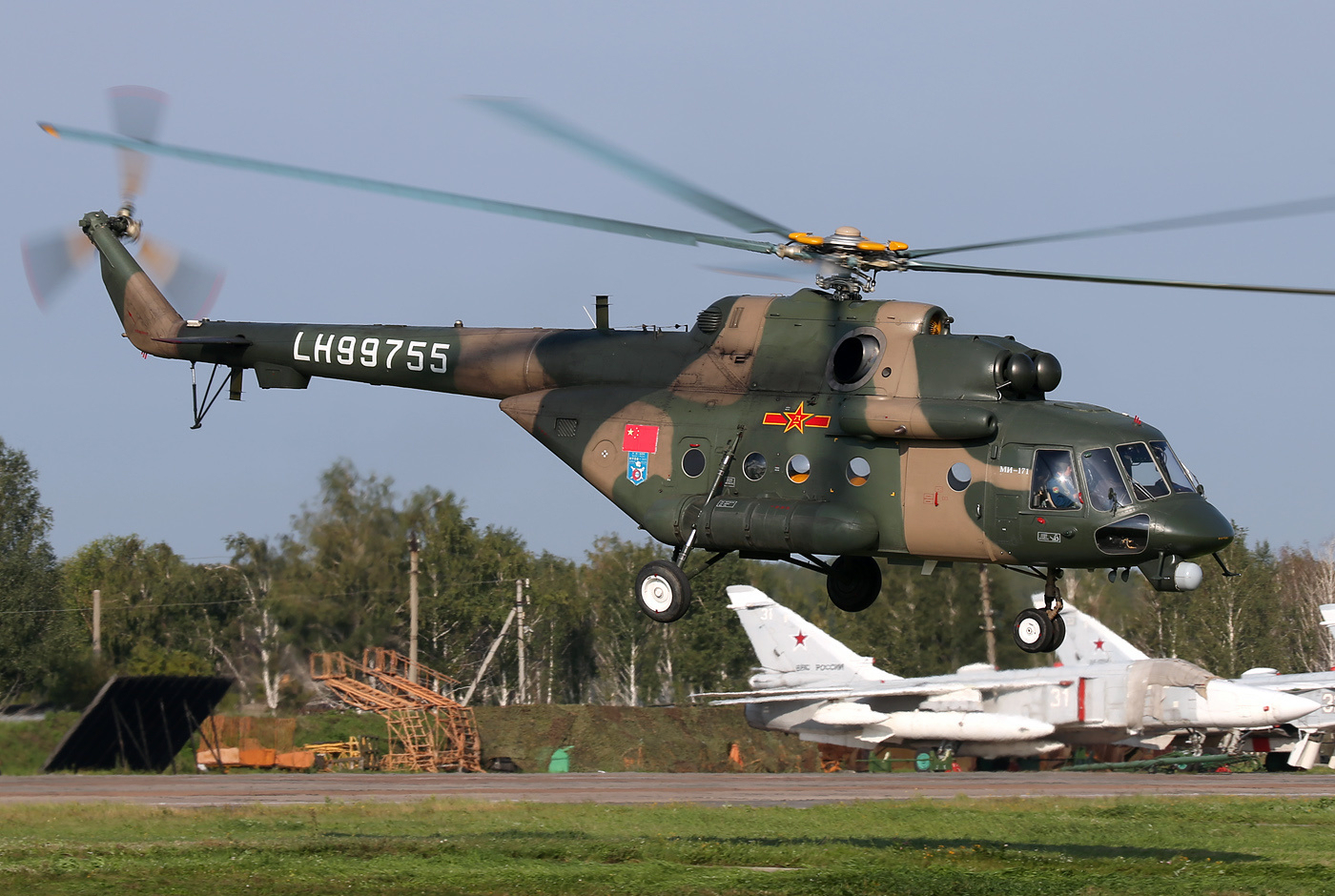
People's Liberation Army Mi-17

=== China ===
- People's Liberation Army Air Force
- People's Liberation Army Ground Force Aviation
- People's Liberation Army Naval Air Force

=== Colombia ===
- Colombian National Army Aviation
- Colombian Navy

=== Republic of the Congo ===
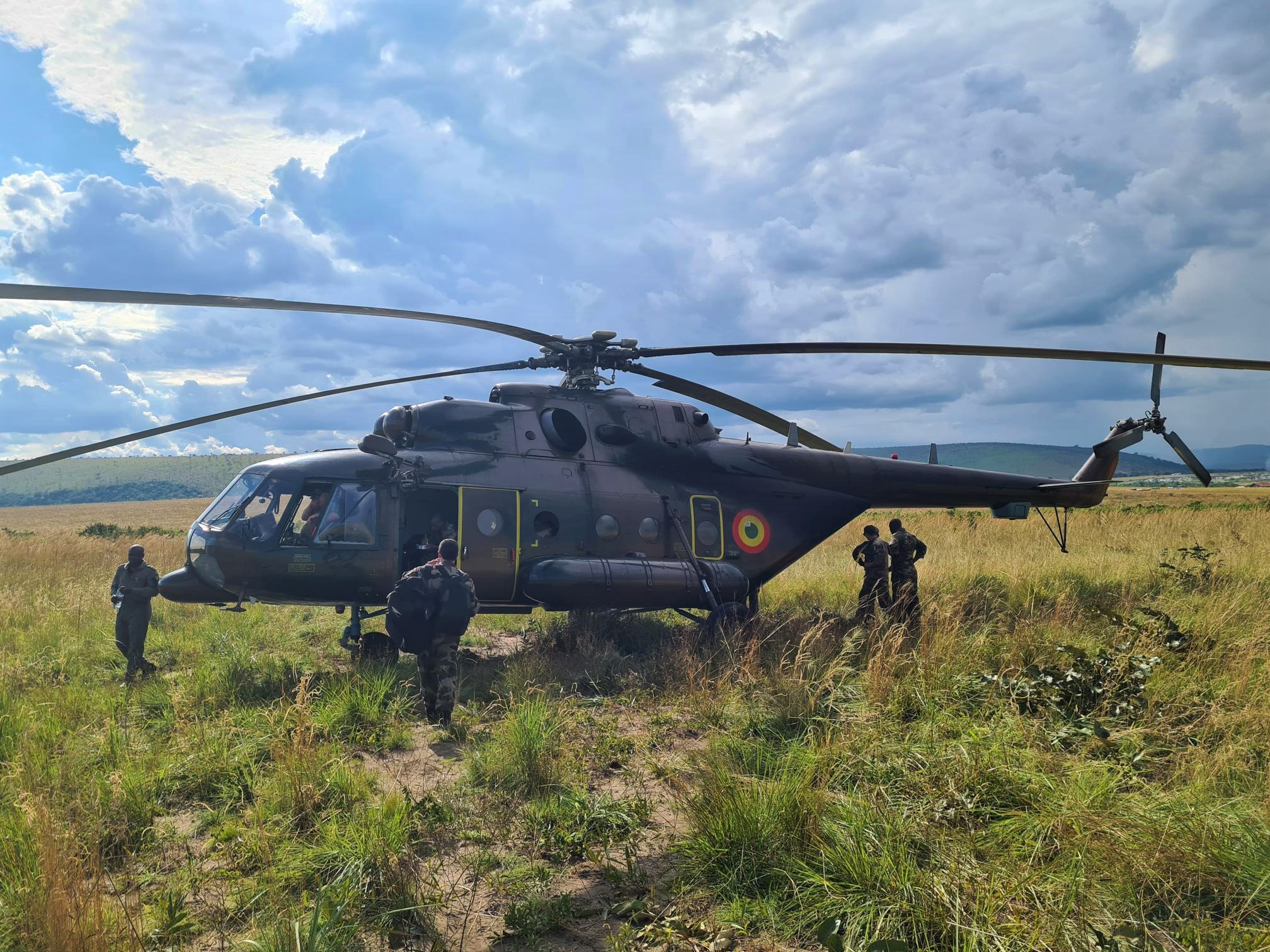
A Congolese Mi-17 in 2023

- Congolese Air Force

=== Democratic Republic of the Congo ===
- Congo Democratic Air Force

=== Croatia ===
- Croatian Air Force

=== Cuba ===
- Cuban Revolutionary Air and Air Defense Force

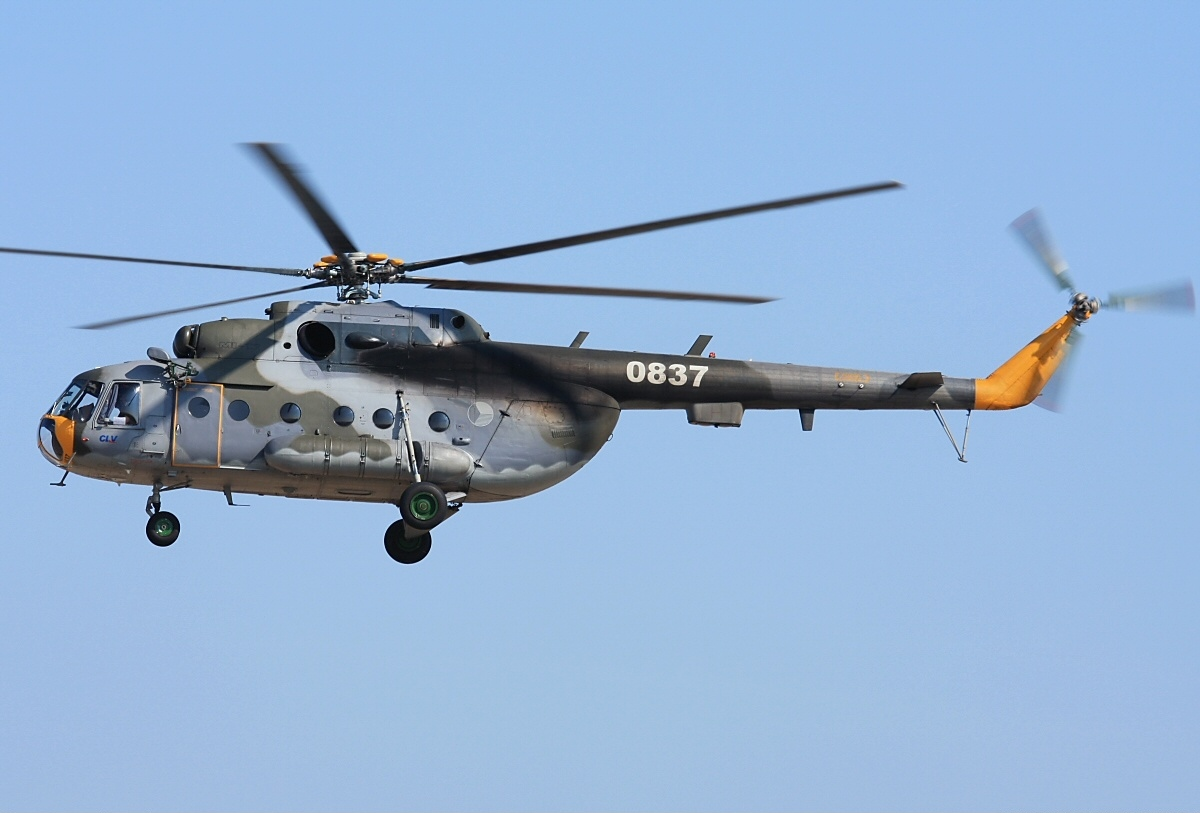
A Czech Republic Mi-171

=== Czech Republic ===
- Czech Air Force

=== Djibouti ===
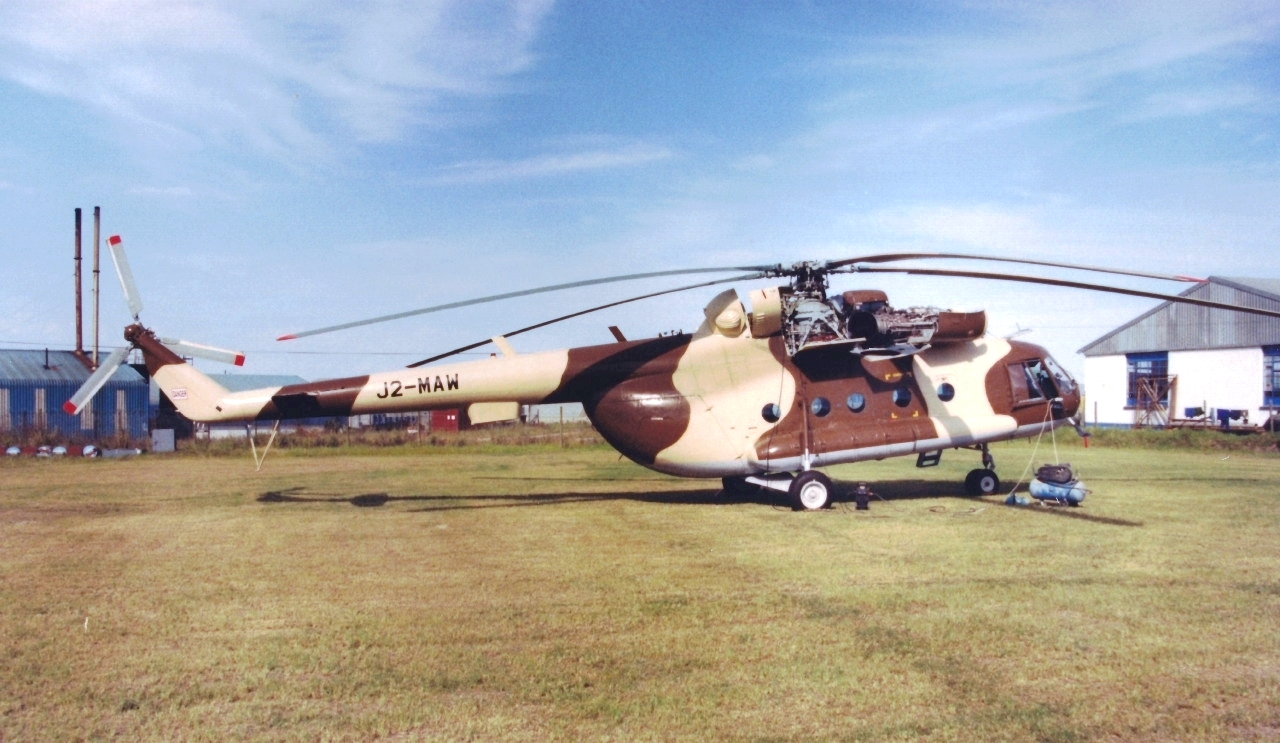
Djiboutian Mi-17

- Djibouti Air Force

=== Ecuador ===
- Ecuadorian Army Aviation

=== Egypt ===
- Egyptian Air Force

=== Equatorial Guinea ===
- Equatorial Guinea Air Force

=== Eritrea ===
- Eritrean Air Force

=== Ethiopia ===
- Ethiopian Air Force

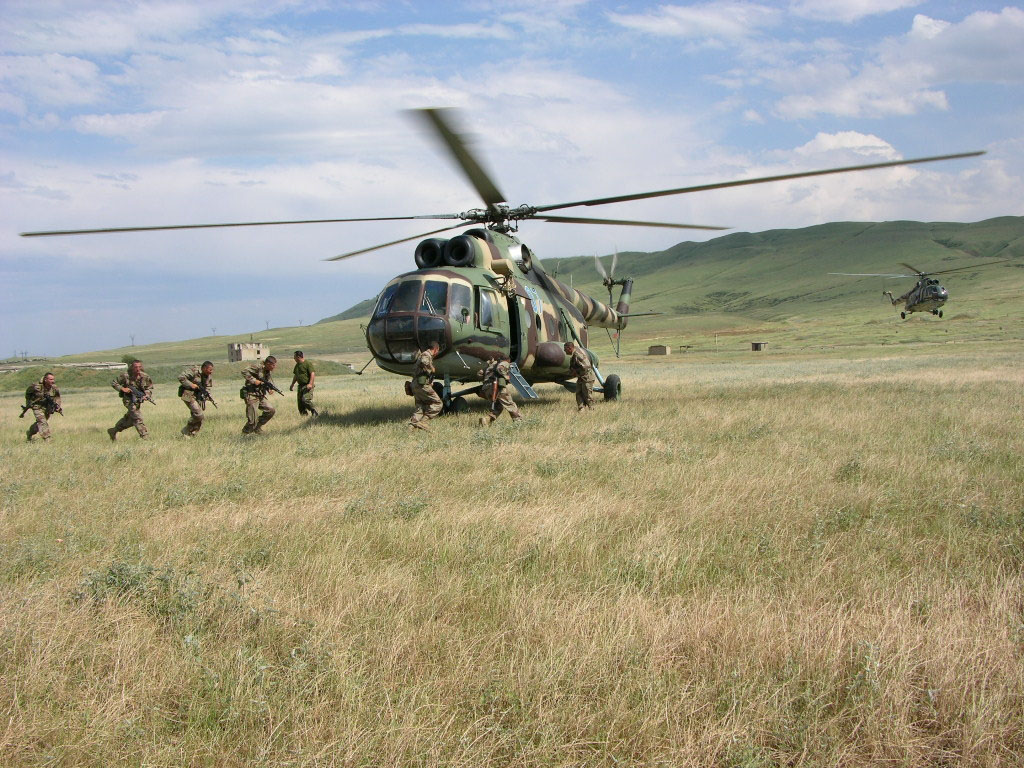
Georgian soldiers board Mil Mi-8.

=== Georgia ===
- Georgian Air Force

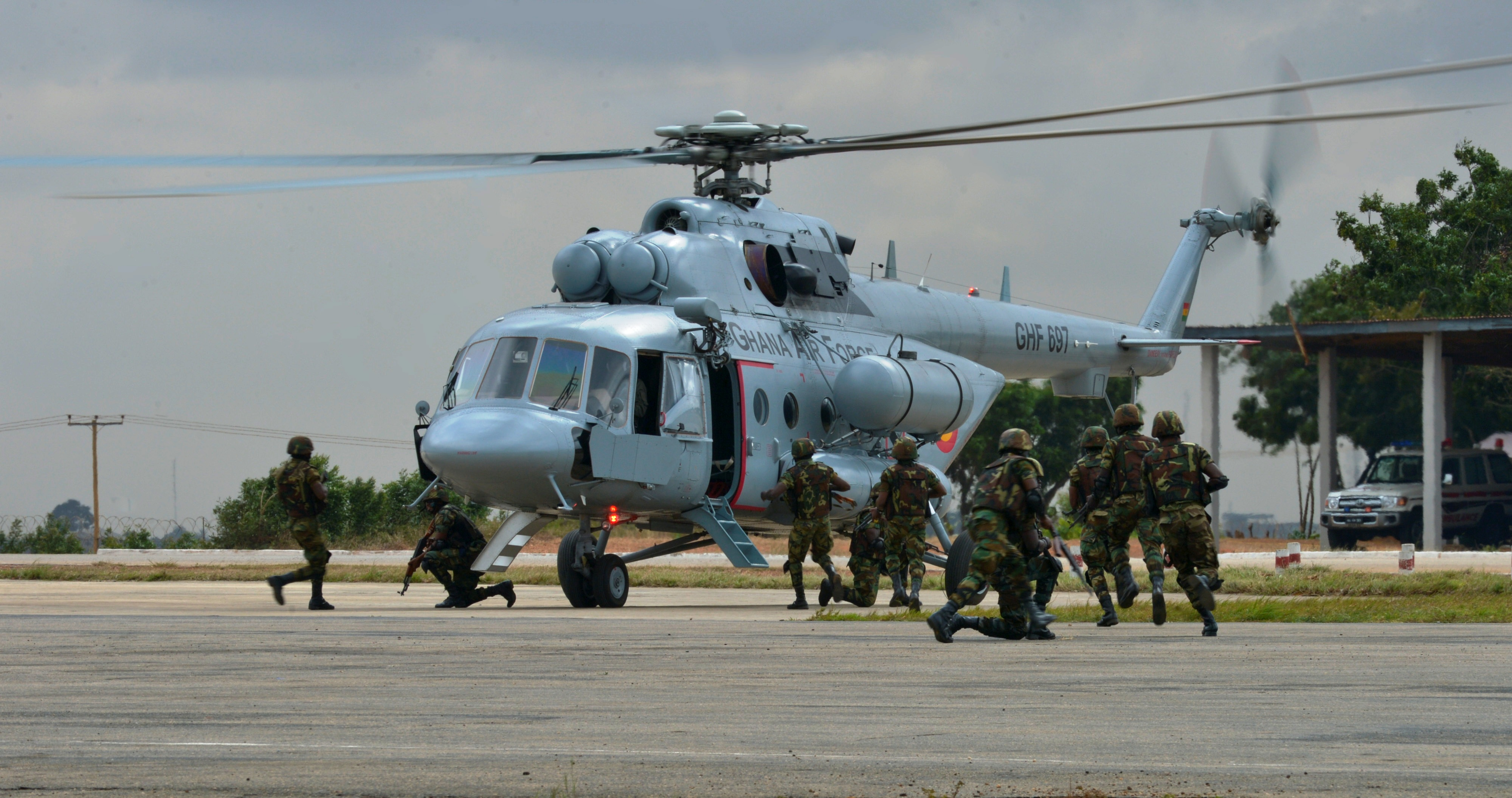
A Ghanaian special forces team board an Mi-17 helicopter

=== Ghana ===
- Ghana Air Force

=== Guinea ===
- Guinea Air Force

=== India ===
- Indian Air Force

=== Indonesia ===
- Indonesian Army

=== Iran ===
- Islamic Republic of Iran Navy Aviation
- Islamic Revolutionary Guard Corps Air and Space Force

=== Iraq ===
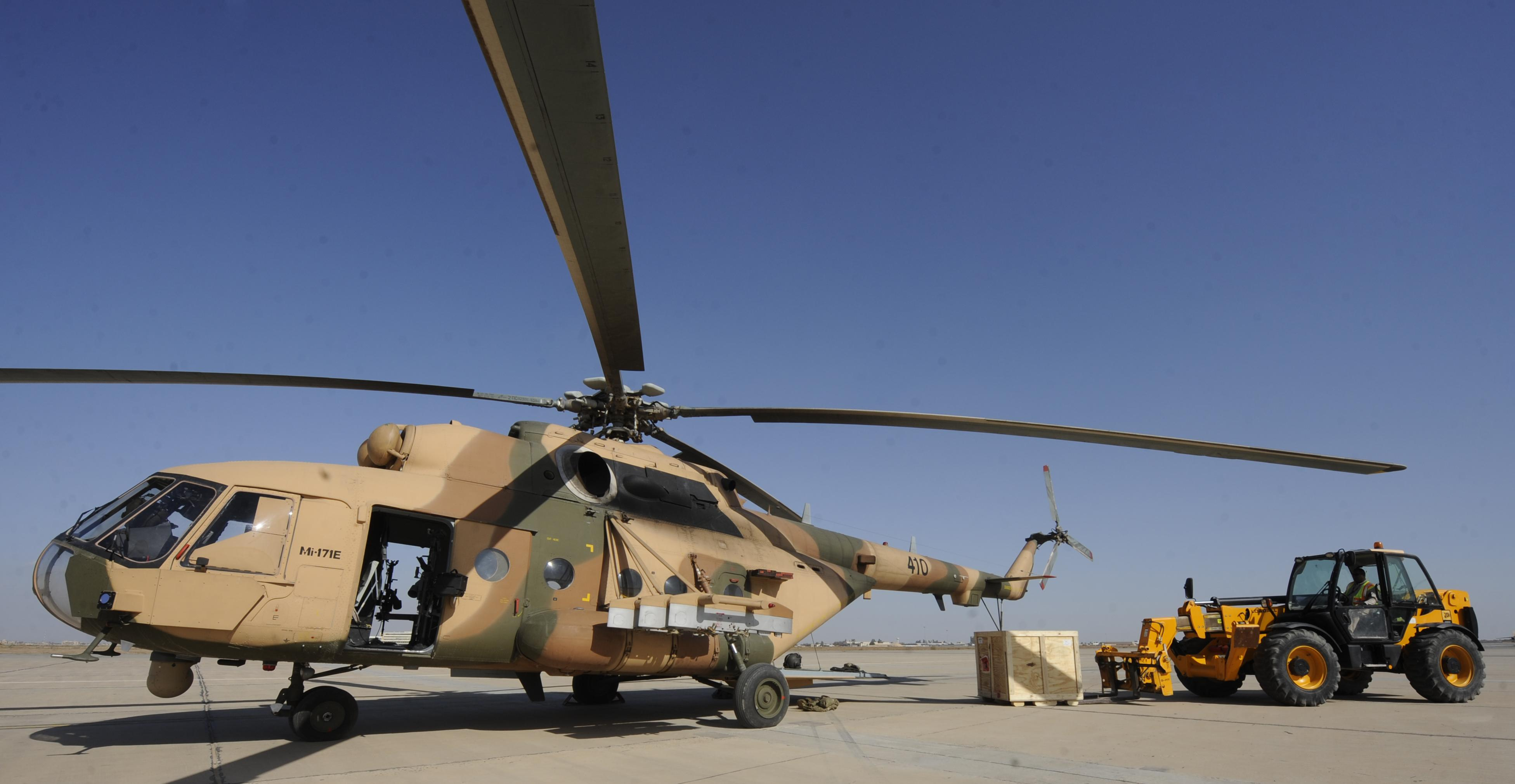
An Iraqi Army Aviation Mi-171 in 2011

- Iraqi Air Force
- Iraqi Army Aviation

=== Ivory Coast ===
- Ivory Coast Air Force

=== Kazakhstan ===
- Kazakh Air Defense Forces

=== Kenya ===
- Kenya Air Force

=== Kyrgyzstan ===
- Kyrgyz Air Force

=== Laos ===
- Lao People's Liberation Army Air Force

=== Libya ===
- Libyan Air Force

=== Lithuania ===
- Lithuanian Air Force

=== Mali ===
- Malian Air Force

=== Mexico ===
- Mexican Air Force
- Mexican Naval Aviation

=== Moldova ===
- Moldovan Air Force

=== Mongolia ===
- Mongolian Air Force

=== Mozambique ===
- Mozambique Air Force

=== Myanmar ===
- Myanmar Air Force

=== Namibia ===
- Namibian Air Force

=== Nepal ===
- Nepalese Army Air Service

=== Nicaragua ===
- Nicaraguan Air Force

=== Niger ===
- Niger Air Force

=== Nigeria ===
- Nigerian Air Force

=== North Korea ===
- Korean People's Army Air Force

=== North Macedonia ===
- North Macedonia Air Force

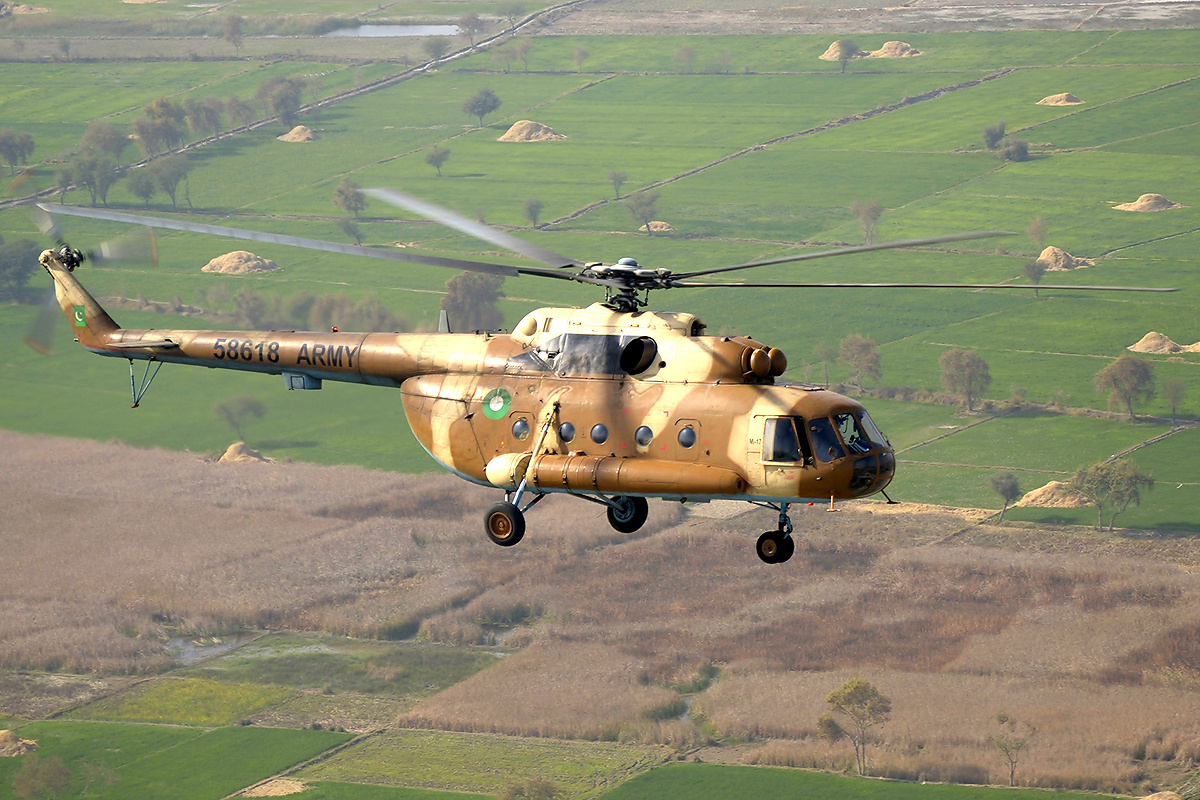
A Mi-17 of the Pakistan Army

=== Pakistan ===
- Pakistan Air Force
- Pakistan Army

=== Peru ===
- Peruvian Air Force
- Peruvian Army
- Peruvian Navy

=== Poland ===
- Polish Air Force
- Polish Land Forces

=== Russia ===
- Russian Air Force
- Russian Naval Aviation

=== Rwanda ===
- Rwandan Defence Forces

=== Senegal ===
- Senegalese Air Force

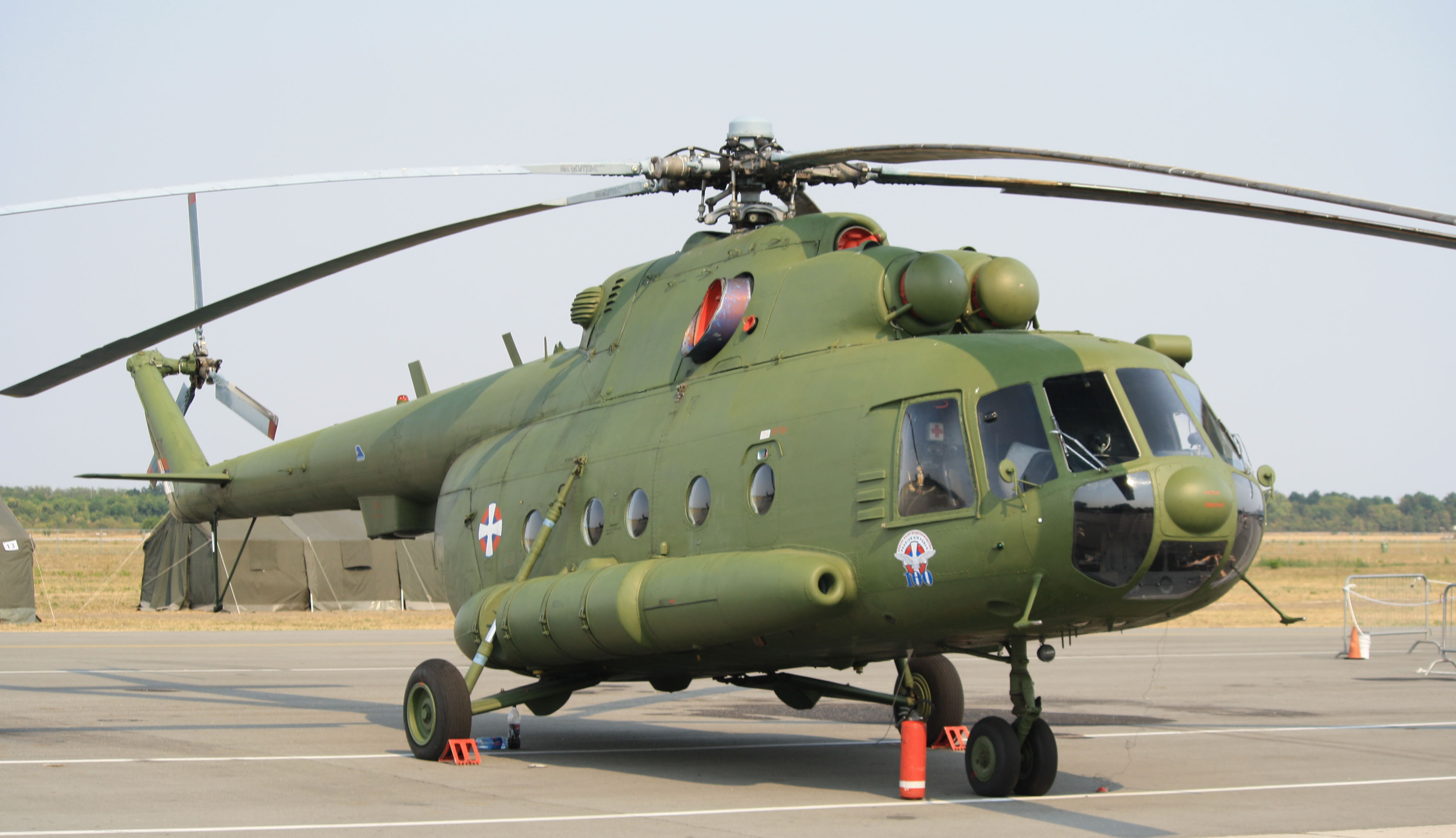
A Mi-17 of the Serbian Air Force

=== Serbia ===
- Serbian Air Force and Air Defense

=== Sierra Leone ===
- Republic of Sierra Leone Armed Forces

=== Slovakia ===
- Slovak Air Force

=== South Sudan ===
- South Sudan Air Force

=== Sri Lanka ===
- Sri Lanka Air Force

=== Sudan ===
- Sudanese Air Force

=== Tajikistan ===
- Tajik Air Force

=== Thailand ===
- Royal Thai Army

=== Togo ===
- Togolese Air Force

=== Turkmenistan ===
- Turkmen Air Force

=== Uganda ===
- Ugandan Air Force

=== Ukraine ===
- Ukrainian Air Force
  - 15th Transport Aviation Brigade
  - 25th Transport Aviation Brigade
  - 456th Transport Aviation Brigade
- Ukrainian Army Aviation
  - 11th Army Aviation Brigade
  - 12th Army Aviation Brigade
  - 16th Army Aviation Brigade
  - 18th Army Aviation Brigade
- Ukrainian Naval Aviation
  - 10th Naval Aviation Brigade

=== United States ===
- United States Air Force
- United States Army

=== Uzbekistan ===
- Uzbekistan Air and Air Defence Forces

=== Venezuela ===
- Bolivarian Military Aviation of Venezuela
- Bolivarian Army of Venezuela
- Bolivarian Navy of Venezuela

=== Vietnam ===
- Vietnam People's Air Force

=== Yemen ===
- Houthi movement
- Yemen Air Force (Captured by Houthi movement)

=== Zambia ===
- Zambia Air Force

=== Zimbabwe ===
- Air Force of Zimbabwe

== Para-military, law enforcement and other government operators ==
=== Bangladesh ===
- Border Guard Bangladesh

=== Equatorial Guinea ===
- Government of Equatorial Guinea

=== Georgia ===
- Abkhazian Air Force
- Ministry of Internal Affairs of Georgia

=== Indonesia ===
- National Disaster Management Authority

=== Libya ===
- Libyan National Army

=== North Macedonia ===
- Ministry of Internal Affairs

=== Malaysia ===
- Malaysian Fire and Rescue Department

=== Moldova ===
- Transnistria Air Force

=== Myanmar ===
- United Wa State Army

=== Pakistan ===
- Government of Balochistan
- Government of Punjab

=== Paraguay ===
- National Police of Paraguay

=== Poland ===
- Polish Police

=== Romania ===
- Ministry of Internal Affairs (Romania) 3 MI 17 and 2 MI-8

=== Russia ===
- Border Service of Russia
- Internal Troops of Russia

=== Republic of Korea ===
- National Police Agency (South Korea)

=== Turkey ===
- Turkish Gendarmerie

=== Turkmenistan ===
- Ministry of Health

=== Ukraine ===
- National Guard of Ukraine

== Civil operators ==
=== Cuba ===
- Aerogaviota

=== India ===
- Pawan Hans Helicopters

=== Indonesia ===
- Airfast Indonesia

=== Mongolia ===
- Mongolian Airlines

=== Nepal ===
- Shree Airlines

=== North Korea ===
- Air Koryo

=== Russia ===
- Altai Airlines
- Barkol Aviation
- Kazan Air Enterprise
- UTAir
- Vladivostok Air
- Aeroflot Airline

=== Slovakia ===
- Air Transport Europe

=== Turkmenistan ===
- Turkmenistan Airlines

=== United States ===
- Vertol Systems

=== Vietnam ===
- Vietnam Helicopter Corporation
  - Northern Vietnam Helicopter Company
  - Central Vietnam Helicopter Company
  - Southern Vietnam Helicopter Company

== Former operators ==
=== Albania ===
- Albanian Air Force

=== Argentina ===
- Argentine Air Force

=== Artsakh ===
- Artsakh Defence Army

=== Bangladesh ===
- Bangladesh Air Force Mi-8

=== Canada ===
- Royal Canadian Air Force
  - 427 Special Operations Aviation Squadron operated four leased Russian Mil Mi-17-V5 designated as CH-178. Helicopters had assigned serial numbers 178404-178407.

=== Costa Rica ===
- Air Vigilance Service: Received a Mi-17 (Mi-8MT) donated by Nicaragua, but its operational status is doubtful due to lack of spare parts.

=== Czechoslovakia ===
- Czechoslovak Air Force

=== East Germany ===
- East German Air Force
- East German Navy

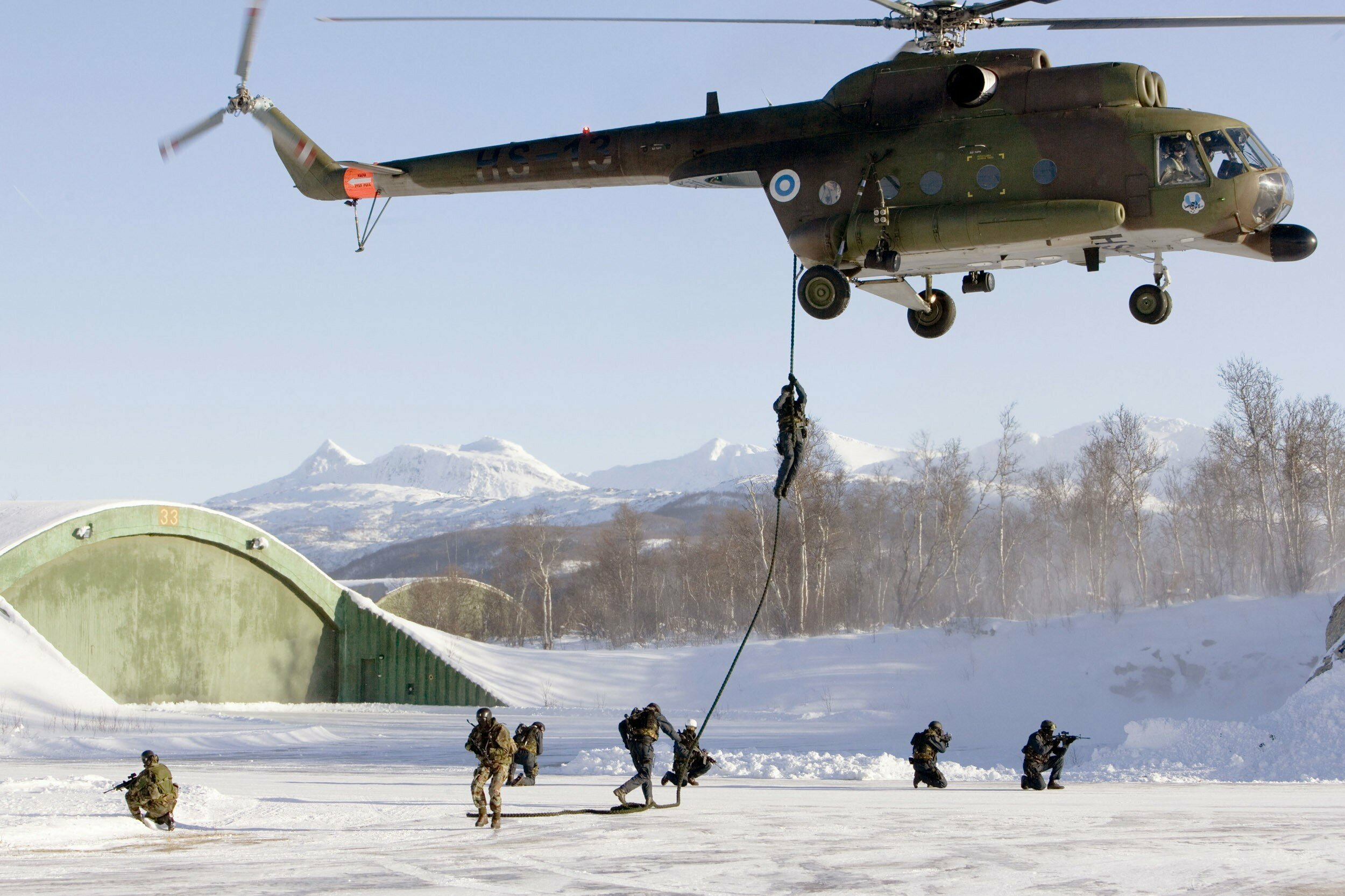
Finnish Mi-8T inserting special forces during an exercise in 2006.

=== Finland ===
- Finnish Army
- Finnish Border Guard

=== Georgia ===
- Georgian Land Forces

=== Germany ===
- German Air Force
- German Navy

=== Guinea-Bissau ===
- Military of Guinea-Bissau

=== Hungary ===
- Hungarian Air Force

=== Japan ===
- Aum Shinrikyo
  - Serial No. 4K-15214. Imported from Azerbaijan in 1994 for use in chemical spraying operations, but failed to obtain the required operating licenses and consequently never flew in Japan. In 2001, exported to Djibouti as J2-MAW.
- Aero Asahi

=== Laos ===
- Lao Airlines

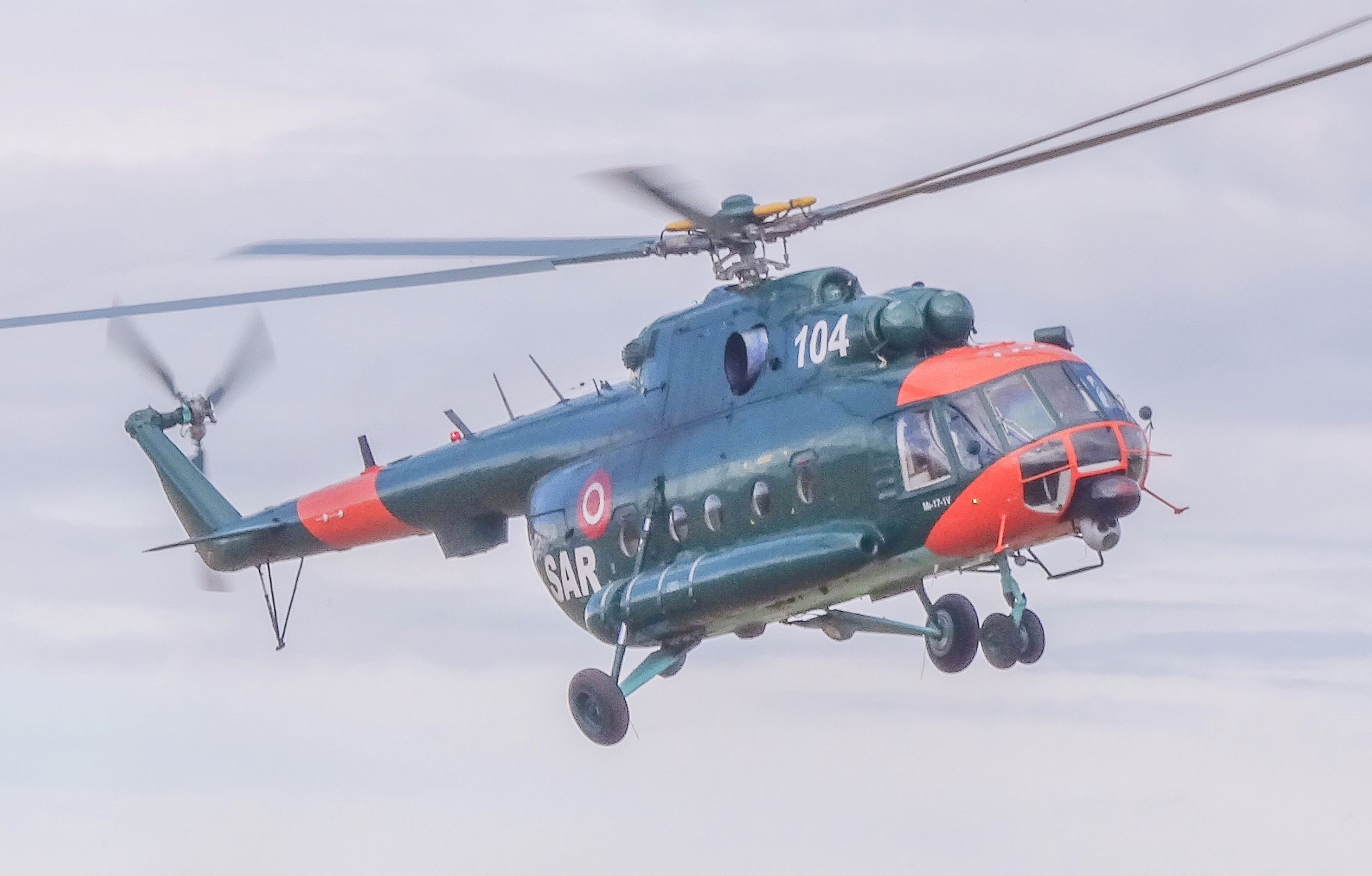
A former Latvian Air Force Mi-8

=== Latvia ===
- Latvian Air Force

=== Madagascar ===
- Malagasy Air Force

=== New Zealand ===
- Heli Harvest

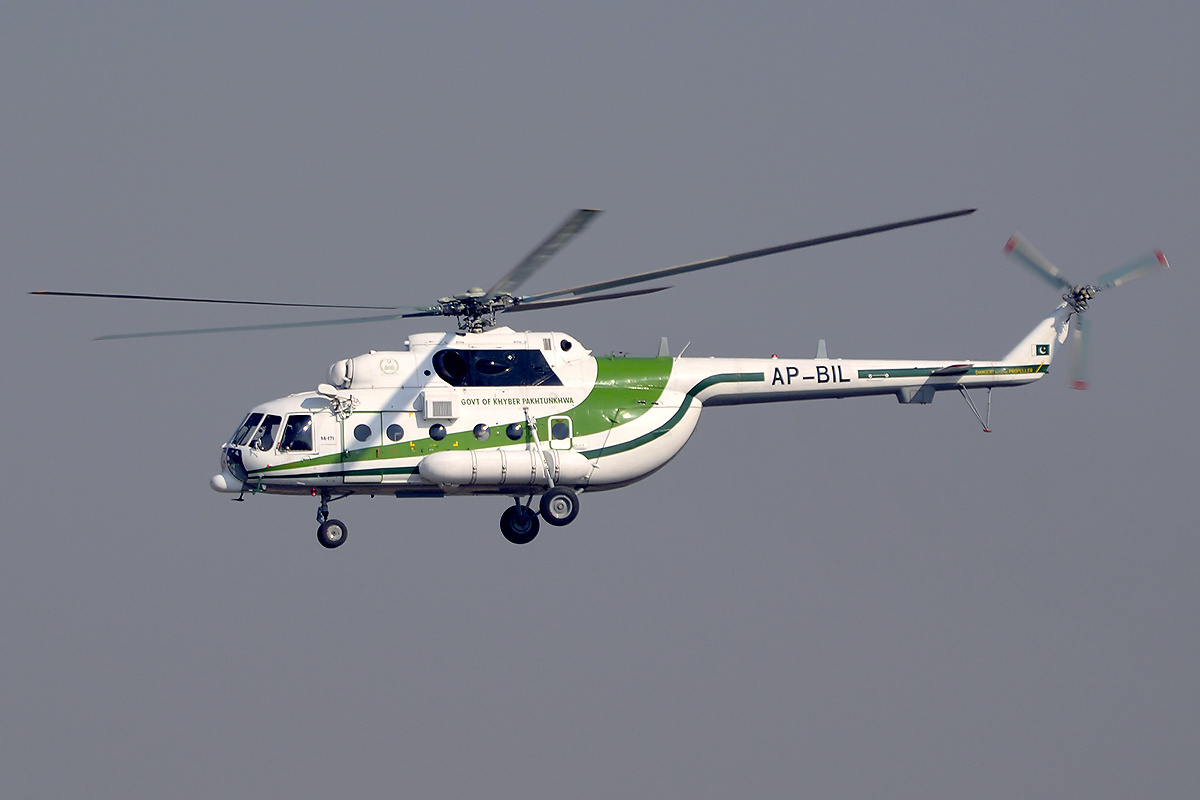
A former Mi-17 of KPK gov, which crashed in 2025.

=== Pakistan ===
- Government of Khyber Pakhtunkhwa

=== Poland ===
- Polish Navy

=== North Yemen ===
- Yemen Arab Republic Air Force

=== Romania ===
- Romanian Air Force

=== Serbia and Montenegro ===
- Serbia and Montenegro Air Force

=== South Yemen ===
- People's Democratic Republic of Yemen Air Force

=== Soviet Union ===
- Soviet Air Force
- Soviet Army Aviation
- Soviet Naval Aviation
- Aeroflot

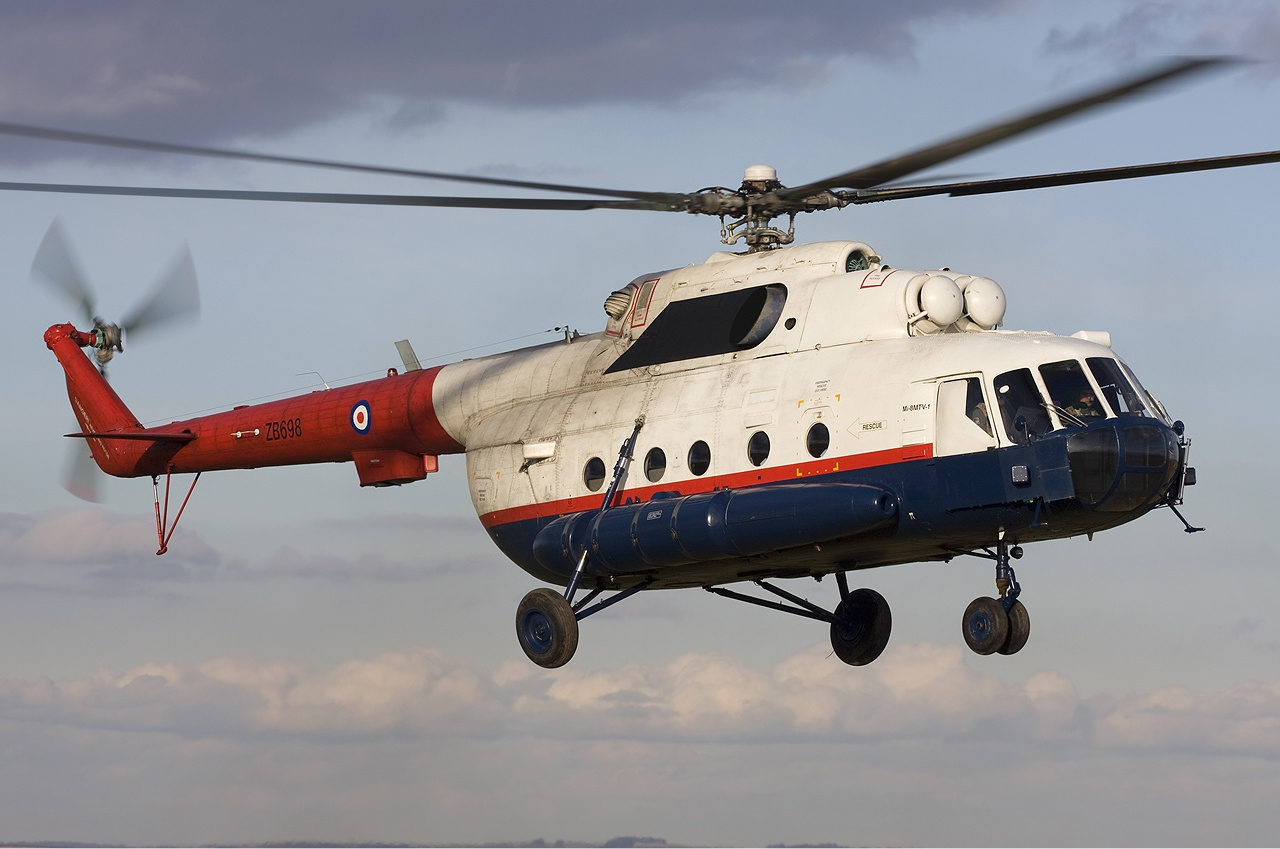
An Mi-17 used by the RAF to train Afghan pilots

=== Republika Srpska ===
- Srpska Air Force

=== Somalia ===
- Somali Air Corps

=== Syria ===
- Syrian Arab Air Force. The Syrian government of Al-Assad fell to rebels in late 2024, and the Syrian Arab Air Force was dismantled. It was re-established as Syrian Air Force, but the revolution, and the Israeli air strikes that followed it, wrecked havoc in the inventory of the Air Force. In late 2025, the World Air Forces publication by FlightGlobal, which tracks the aircraft inventories of world's air forces and publishes its counts annually, removed all Syrian Air Force's aircraft from their World Air Forces 2026 report. It is thus questionable if the Syrian Air Force has any flying aircraft in their inventory, and in particular, any Mil Mi-8/17, as of December 2025.

=== FR Yugoslavia ===
- Yugoslav Air Force
- Yugoslav Navy

=== United Kingdom ===
- Empire Test Pilots' School

=== Yemen ===
- Yemen Air Force

== See also ==
- Mil Mi-8
- Mil Mi-17
