= Mil Mi-52 =

The Mil Mi-52 "Snegir" is a projected four-seat light utility helicopter of the 1990s. The given name, "Snegir", is Russian for bullfinch. One mockup was built in 2000 and had two planned versions, which had different designations based on their engine number: Mi-52-1, with single 199 kW VAZ-4265 turboshaft engine, and Mi-52-2, with twin engines of the same kind.
