= Klimov GTD-350 =

1960s Soviet turboshaft aircraft engine

GTD-350
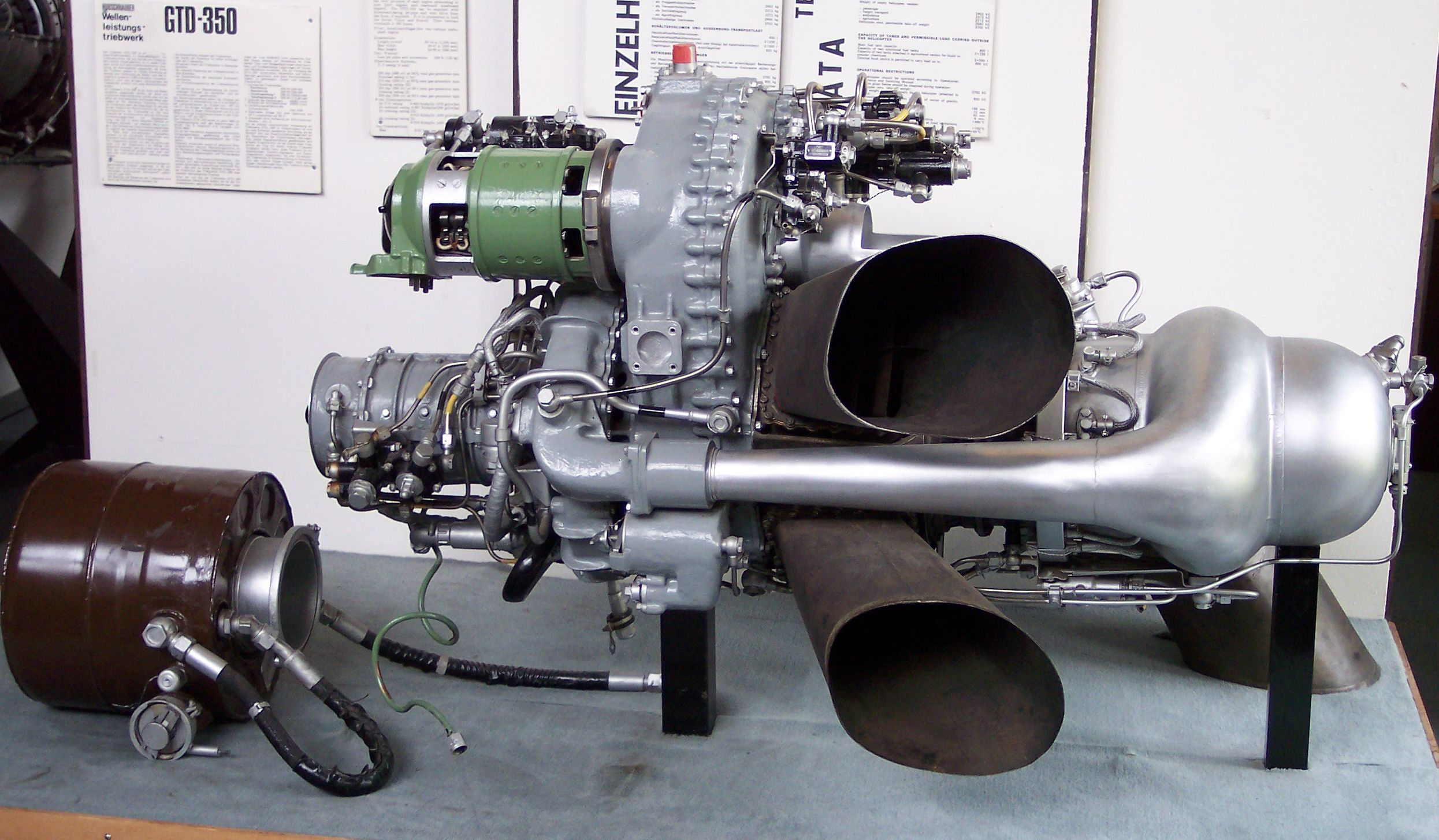
- Type: Turboshaft
- Manufacturer: Klimov
- First run: 1963
- Major applications: Mil Mi-2
- Number built: > 11,000

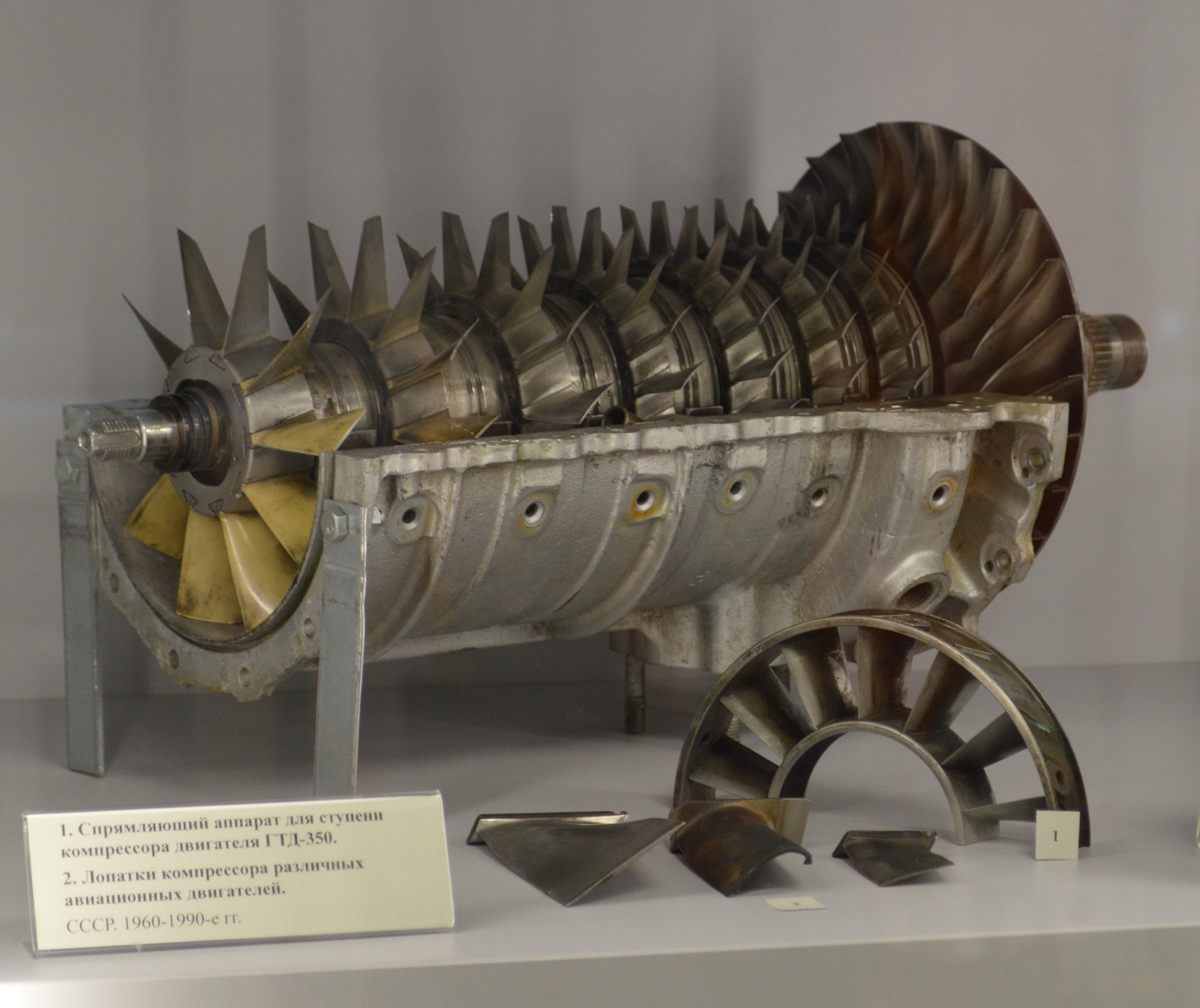
Compressor of GTD-350 engine

The Klimov GTD-350 (initially Isotov GTD-350) is a Soviet gas-turbine turboshaft engine intended for helicopter use. Designed in the early 1960s by the Isotov Design Bureau the engine was later produced by Klimov and PZL, production ending in the late 1990s.

The GTD-350 powers the Mil Mi-2, the first Soviet gas-turbine powered helicopter, and has accumulated over 20 million hours in service.

== Applications ==
- Mil Mi-2

== Specifications (GTD-350) ==
Data from Klimov, World Encyclopaedia of Aero Engines, Aircraft engines of the World 1970

==== General characteristics ====
- Type: Turboshaft
- Length: 1,350 mm (53 in)
- Diameter: ~450 mm (18 in) inlet casing
- Width: 522 mm (20.6 in)
- Height: 680 mm (27 in)
- Dry weight: 135 kg (298 lb)

==== Components ====
- Compressor: Seven-stage axial flow plus single-stage centrifugal
- Combustors: Single-chamber reverse flow
- Turbine: Single-stage compressor turbine, two-stage power turbine
- Fuel type: Aviation Kerosene, such as JP-4
- Oil system: Pressure spray at 3.1 bar (45 psi)

==== Performance ====
- Maximum power output:

Take-off: 300 kW (400 shp) at 45,000 rpm (gas generator)
Normal: 240 kW (320 shp) at 40,000 rpm (gas generator)

- Overall pressure ratio: 6.05:1 at 45,000 rpm
- Air mass flow: 2.19 kg/s (290 lb/min)
- Turbine inlet temperature: 1,210 K (940 °C)
- Specific fuel consumption: 0.49 kg/kWh (0.8 lb/(hp⋅h))
- Power-to-weight ratio: 2.20 kW/kg (1.34 hp/lb)

== See also ==
Comparable engines

- Allison Model 250

Related lists

- List of aircraft engines
