= Mil Mi-58 =

Mi-58

General information
- Type: Passenger Helicopter
- National origin: Russia
- Manufacturer: Mil

History
- Developed from: Mil Mi-28

The Mil Mi-58 was a projected twin-turbine passenger helicopter based on the Mil Mi-28 attack helicopter first announced at the 1995 Paris Air Show. It was planned to have two 2,088 kW Klimov TV3-117VMA-SB3 turboshaft engines, Mi-28's main rotor and tail rotor, and fixed tricycle-type landing gear with one nosewheel and two rear wheels on long sponsons. It was said to accommodate 20 passengers with various seating configurations.
