= Mil Moscow Helicopter Plant =

Russian designer and producer of helicopters

Mil Helicopters
- Type: Joint-stock company
- Industry: Aerospace
- Founded: 1947; 79 years ago
- Founder: Mikhail Mil
- Headquarters: Tomilino, Russia
- Revenue: $184 million (2017)
- Operating income: $21.5 million (2017; 2011)
- Net income: $6.79 million (2017)
- Total assets: $287 million (2017)
- Total equity: $69.1 million (2017)
- Parent: Russian Helicopters
- Website: rhc.ru/en

Mil Moscow Helicopter Plant (Russian: Московский вертолётный завод им. М. Л. Миля) is a Russian designer and producer of helicopters headquartered in Tomilino, Moscow. It is a subsidiary of Russian Helicopters.

The Mil Moscow Helicopter Plant includes a design bureau and an experimental production plant. The Mil Design Bureau is one of the world's leading developers of helicopters, with particular expertise in heavy-lift helicopters. It has developed both civil and military versions in a wide range of payload capacities, including the world's largest in serial production, the Mi-26.

Ninety-five percent of the helicopters in the former Soviet Union were built to Mil designs. Series production facilities for Mil-designed helicopters include Rostvertol in Rostov-on-Don, the Kazan Helicopter Production Association, and the Ulan-Ude Aviation Plant. Mil participates in the Euromil joint venture with Eurocopter.

== History ==
Mil was established in 1947 under the guidance of Mikhail Mil as the helicopter laboratory of the Central Aerohydrodynamic Institute in Zhukovsky, Moscow Oblast.

The Mil Mi-1 became the first mass-produced Soviet helicopter. The Mi-8 helicopter, designed in the early 1960s, was a successful design in both military and civil applications, with over 12,000 units being produced.

Mil merged with Kamov and Rostvertol to form Russian Helicopters in 2006. The Mil brand name has been retained, although the new company eliminated overlapping product lines.

== See also ==
- List of Mil Moscow Helicopter Plant aircraft
