= Bell tower =

Tower containing or designed to hold bells

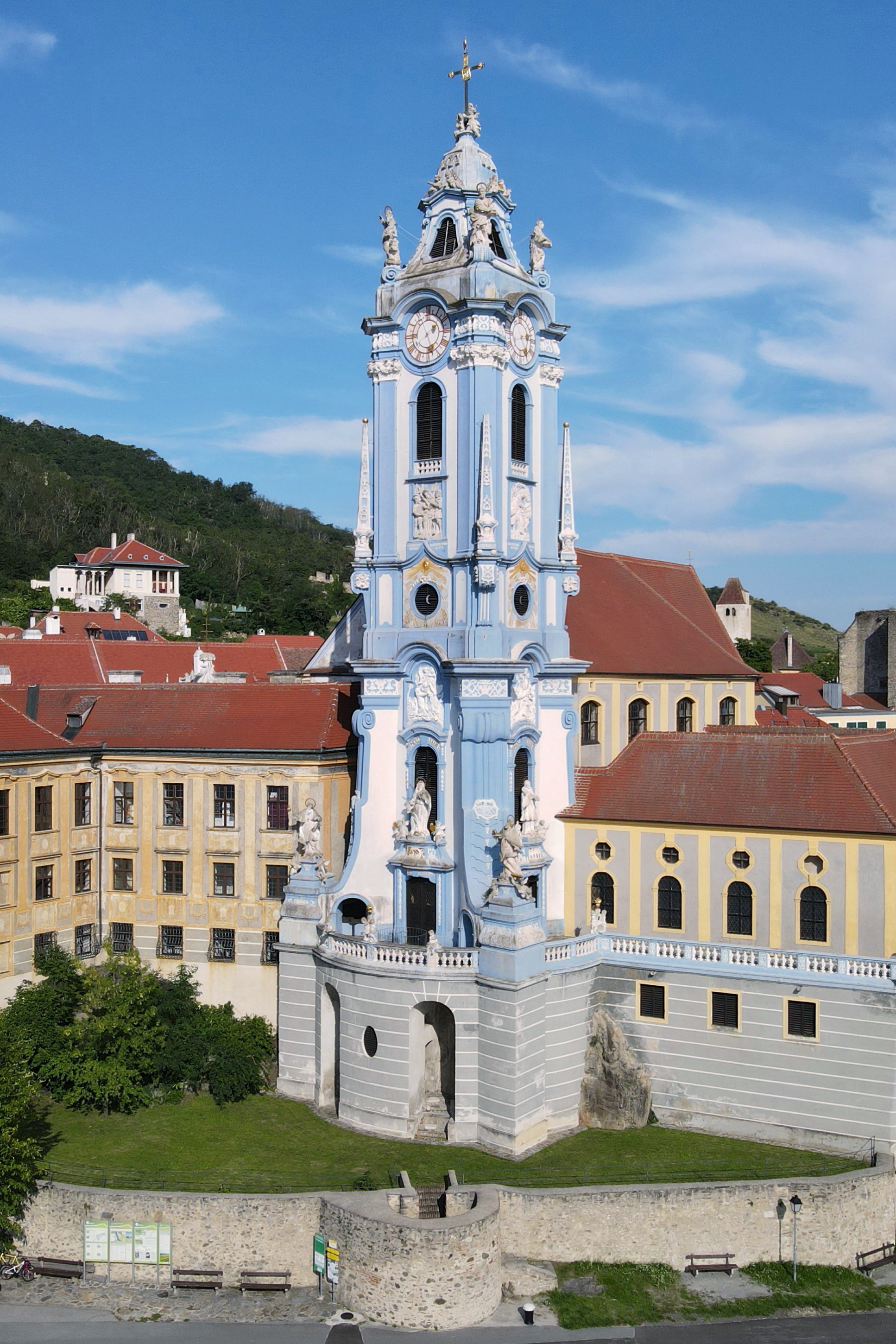
Bell tower of the former Christian monastery in Dürnstein, Lower Austria

A bell tower is a tower that contains one or more bells, or that is designed to hold bells even if it has none. Such a tower commonly serves as part of a Christian church, and will contain church bells, but there are also many secular bell towers, often part of a municipal building, an educational establishment, or a tower built specifically to house a carillon. Church bell towers often incorporate clocks, and secular towers usually do, as a public service.

The term campanile (/ˌkæmpəˈniːli, -leɪ/ KAM-pə-NEE-lee, -lay, US also /ˌkɑːm-/ KAHM-, Italian: [kampaˈniːle]), from Italian and deriving from campana "bell", is synonymous with bell tower; though, in English usage, campanile tends to be used to refer to a free standing bell tower. A bell tower may also in some traditions be called a belfry, though this term may also refer specifically to the substructure that houses the bells and the ringers rather than the complete tower.

The tallest free-standing bell tower in the world, 113.2 metres (371 ft) high, is the Mortegliano Bell Tower, in the Friuli-Venezia Giulia region, Italy.

== Purpose ==
Elizabeth Tower, London completed in 1859; better known as Big Ben.

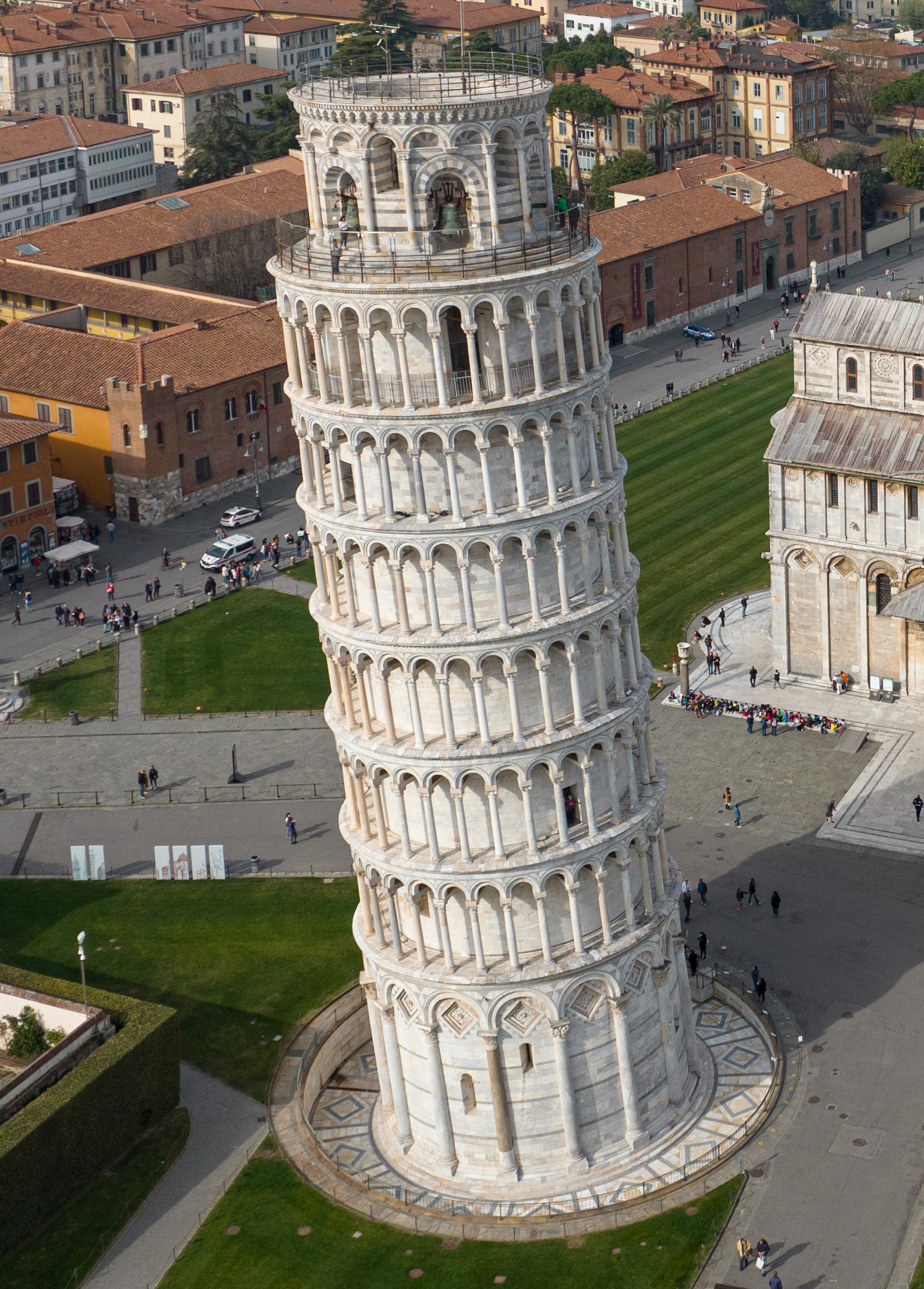
The Leaning Tower of Pisa, campanile of the Duomo di Pisa, Italy

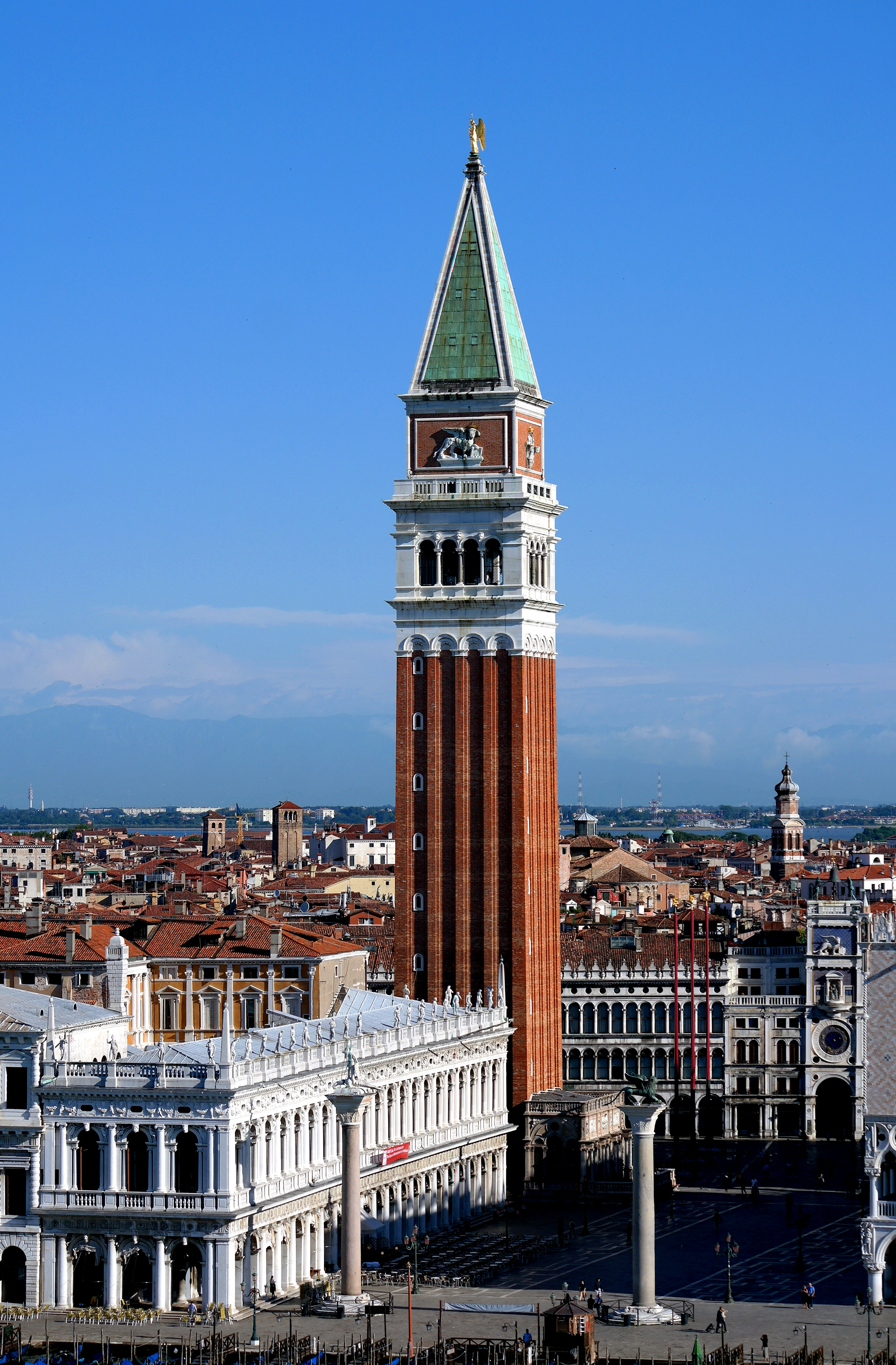
St Mark's Campanile, Venice

Bells are rung from a tower to enable them to be heard at a distance. Church bells can signify the time for worshippers to go to church for a communal service, and can be an indication of the fixed times of daily Christian prayer, called the canonical hours, which number seven and are contained in breviaries. They are also rung on special occasions such as a wedding, or a funeral service. In some religious traditions they are used within the liturgy of the church service to signify to people that a particular part of the service has been reached.

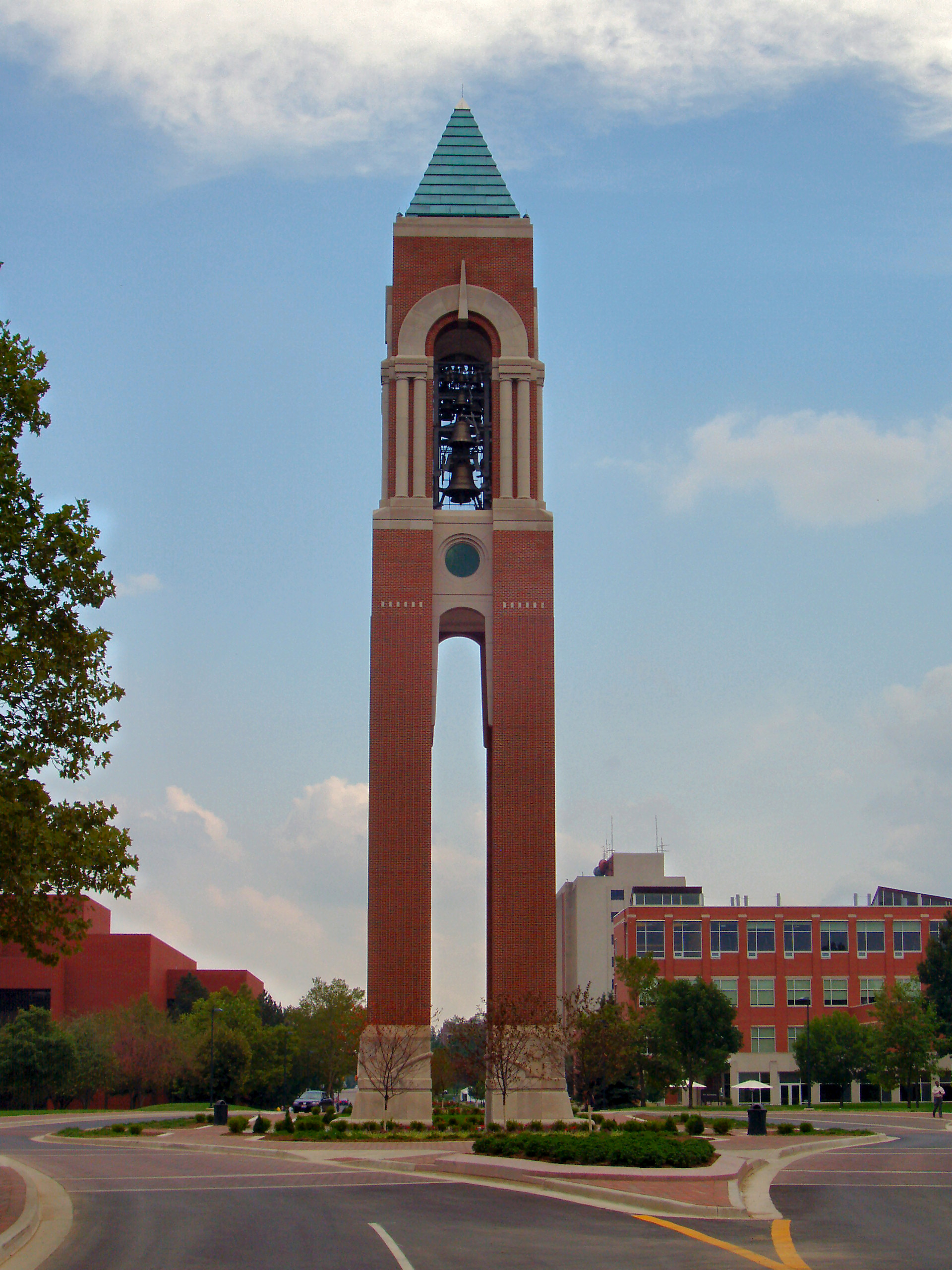
Shafer Tower at Ball State University in Muncie, Indiana

A bell tower may have a single bell, or a collection of bells which are tuned to a common scale. They may be stationary and chimed, rung randomly by swinging through a small arc, or swung through a full circle to enable the high degree of control of English change ringing. They may house a carillon or chimes, in which the bells are sounded by hammers connected via cables to a keyboard. These can be found in many churches and secular buildings in Europe and America including college and university campuses.

A variety of electronic devices exist to simulate the sound of bells, but any substantial tower in which a considerable sum of money has been invested will generally have a real set of bells.

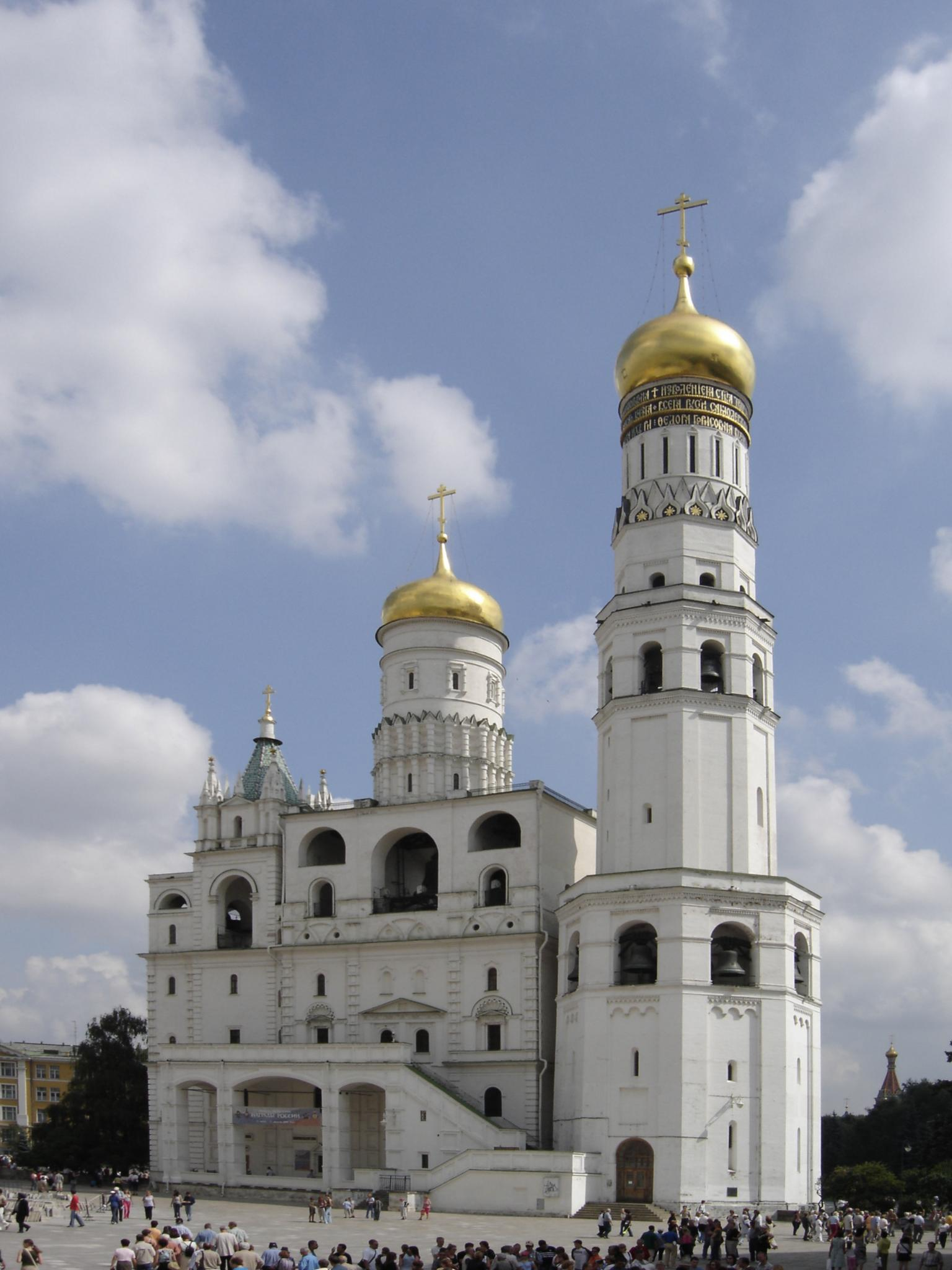
Ivan The Great Bell Tower in the Kremlin in Moscow, built in 1508

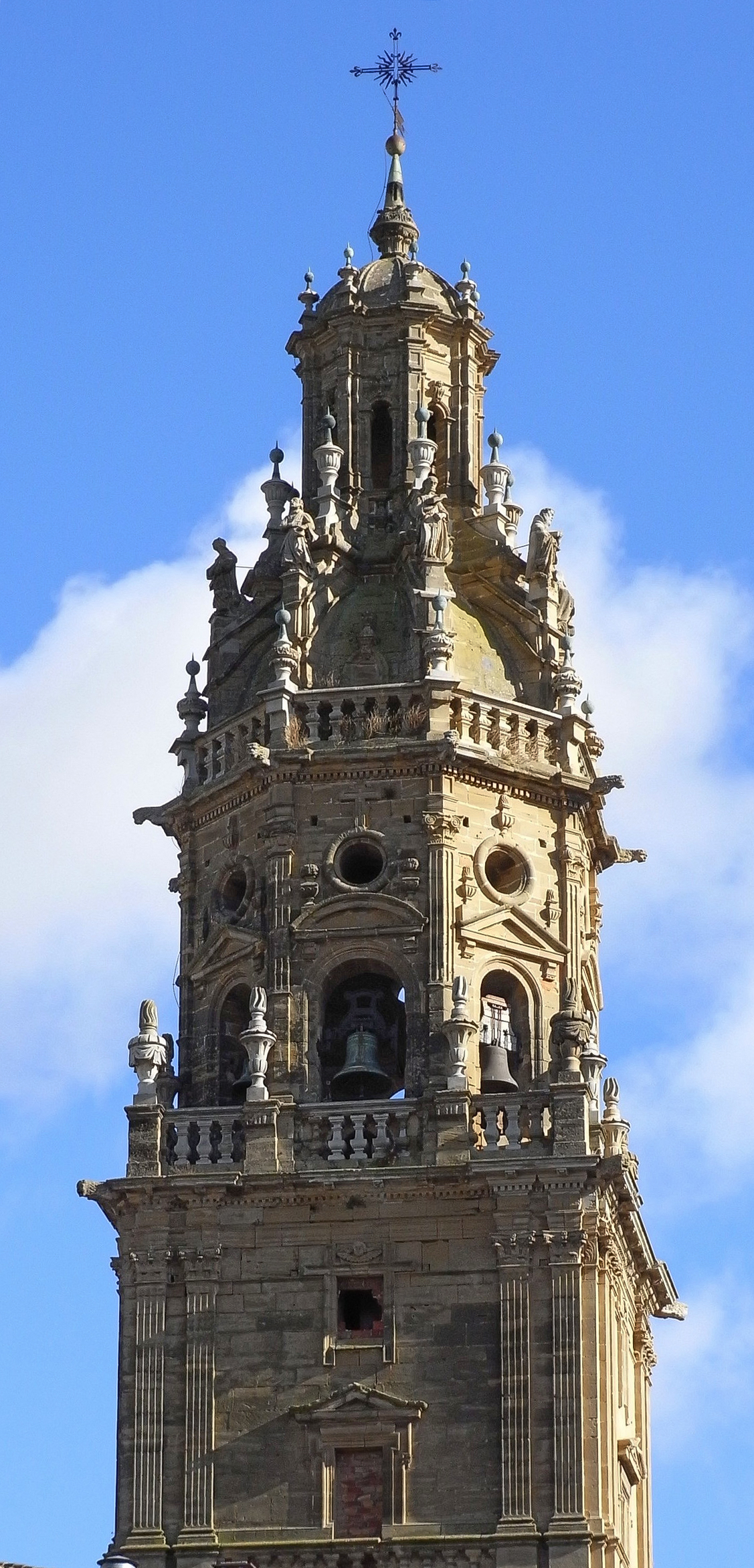
The Santo Tomás parish church in Haro, La Rioja has an exconjuratory for weather prayers in its bell tower.

Some churches have an exconjuratory in the bell tower, a space where ceremonies were conducted to ward off weather-related calamities, like storms and excessive rain. The main bell tower of the Cathedral of Murcia has four.

In Christianity, many churches ring their church bells from belltowers three times a day, at 9 am, 12 pm and 3 pm to summon the Christian faithful to recite the Lord's Prayer; the injunction to pray the Lord's prayer thrice daily was given in Didache 8, 2 f., which, in turn, was influenced by the Jewish practice of praying thrice daily found in the Old Testament, specifically in Psalm 55:17, which suggests "evening and morning and at noon", and Daniel 6:10, in which the prophet Daniel prays thrice a day. The early Christians thus came to pray the Lord's Prayer at 9 am, 12 pm and 3 pm; as such, in Christianity, many Lutheran and Anglican churches ring their church bells from belltowers three times a day: in the morning, at noon and in the evening calling Christians to recite the Lord's Prayer. Many Catholic Christian churches ring their bells thrice a day, at 6 a.m., noon, and 6 p.m., to call the faithful to recite the Angelus, a prayer recited in honour of the Incarnation of God. Oriental Orthodox Christians, such as Copts and Indians, use a breviary such as the Agpeya and Shehimo to pray the canonical hours seven times a day while facing in the eastward direction; church bells are tolled, especially in monasteries, to mark these seven fixed prayer times (cf. Psalm 119:164).

The Christian tradition of the ringing of church bells from a belltower is analogous to Islamic tradition of the adhan (call to prayer) from a minaret.

Old bell towers which are no longer used for their original purpose may be kept for their historic or architectural value, though in countries with a strong campanological tradition they often continue to have the bells rung.

== History ==
=== Europe ===
In 400 AD, Paulinus of Nola introduced church bells into the Christian Church. By the 11th century, bells housed in belltowers became commonplace.

Historic bell towers exist throughout Europe. The Irish round towers are thought to have functioned in part as bell towers. Famous medieval European examples include Bruges (Belfry of Bruges), Ypres (Cloth Hall, Ypres), Ghent (Belfry of Ghent). Perhaps the most famous European free-standing bell tower, however, is the so-called "Leaning Tower of Pisa", which is the campanile of the Duomo di Pisa in Pisa, Italy. In 1999 thirty-two Belgian belfries were added to the UNESCO's list of World Heritage Sites. In 2005 this list was extended with one Belgian and twenty-three Northern French belfries and is since known as Belfries of Belgium and France. Most of these were attached to civil buildings, mainly city halls, as symbols of the greater power the cities in the region got in the Middle Ages; a small number of buildings not connected with a belfry, such as bell towers of—or with their—churches, also occur on this same list (details). In the Middle Ages, cities sometimes kept their important documents in belfries. Not all are on a large scale; the "bell" tower of Katúň, in Slovakia, is typical of the many more modest structures that were once common in country areas. Archaic wooden bell towers survive adjoining churches in Lithuania and as well as in some parts of Poland.

In Orthodox Eastern Europe bell ringing also has a strong cultural significance (Russian Orthodox bell ringing), and churches were constructed with bell towers (see also List of tall Orthodox Bell towers).

=== China ===
Bell towers (Chinese: Zhonglou, Japanese: Shōrō) are common in China and the countries of related cultures. They may appear both as part of a temple complex and as an independent civic building, often paired with a drum tower, as well as in local church buildings. Among the best known examples are the Bell Tower (Zhonglou) of Beijing and the Bell Tower of Xi'an.

== Gallery ==
Bell towers, belfries and campaniles by date

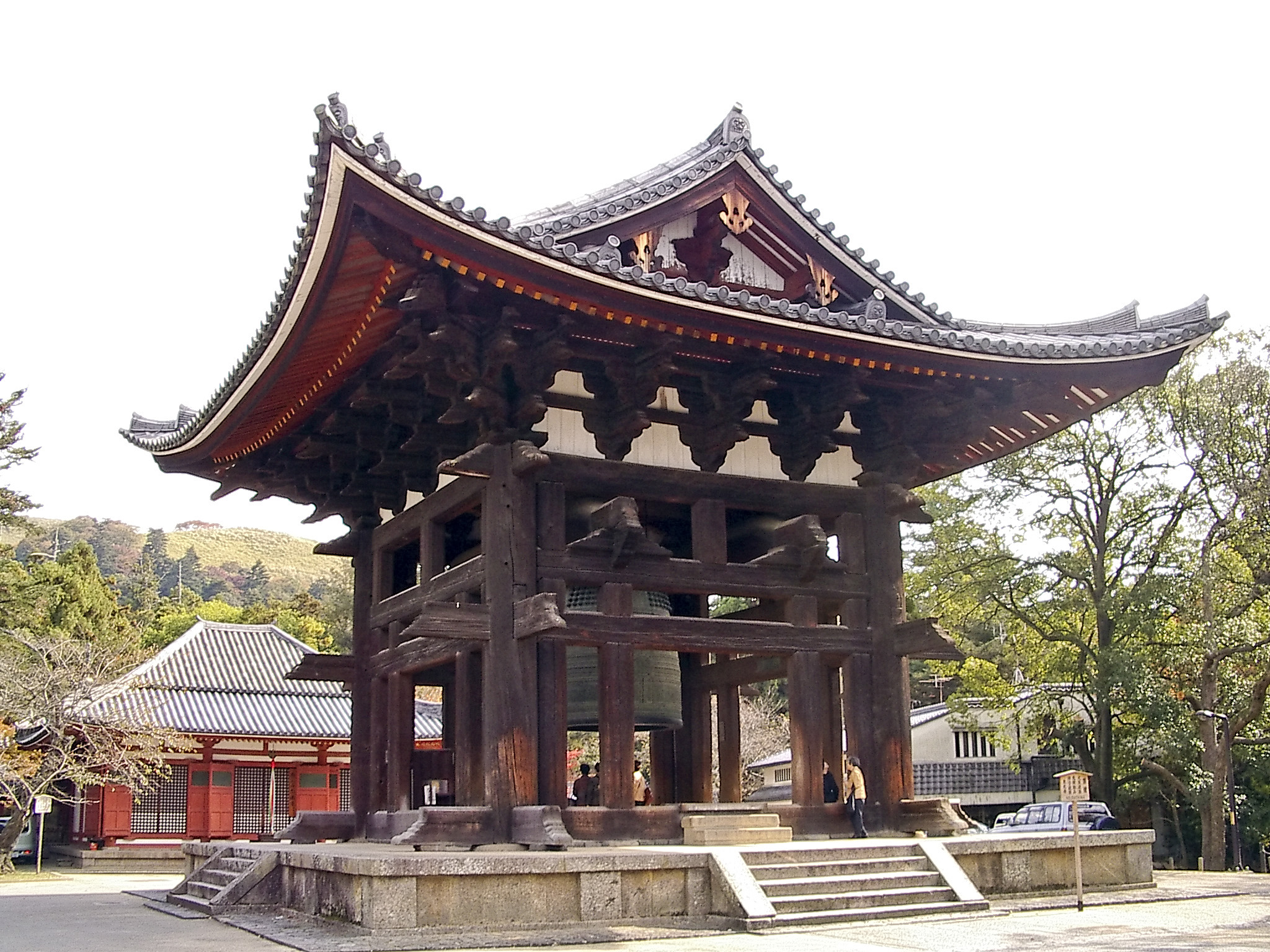
Old Belfry of Tōdai-ji, Japan (752, rebuilt 1200)

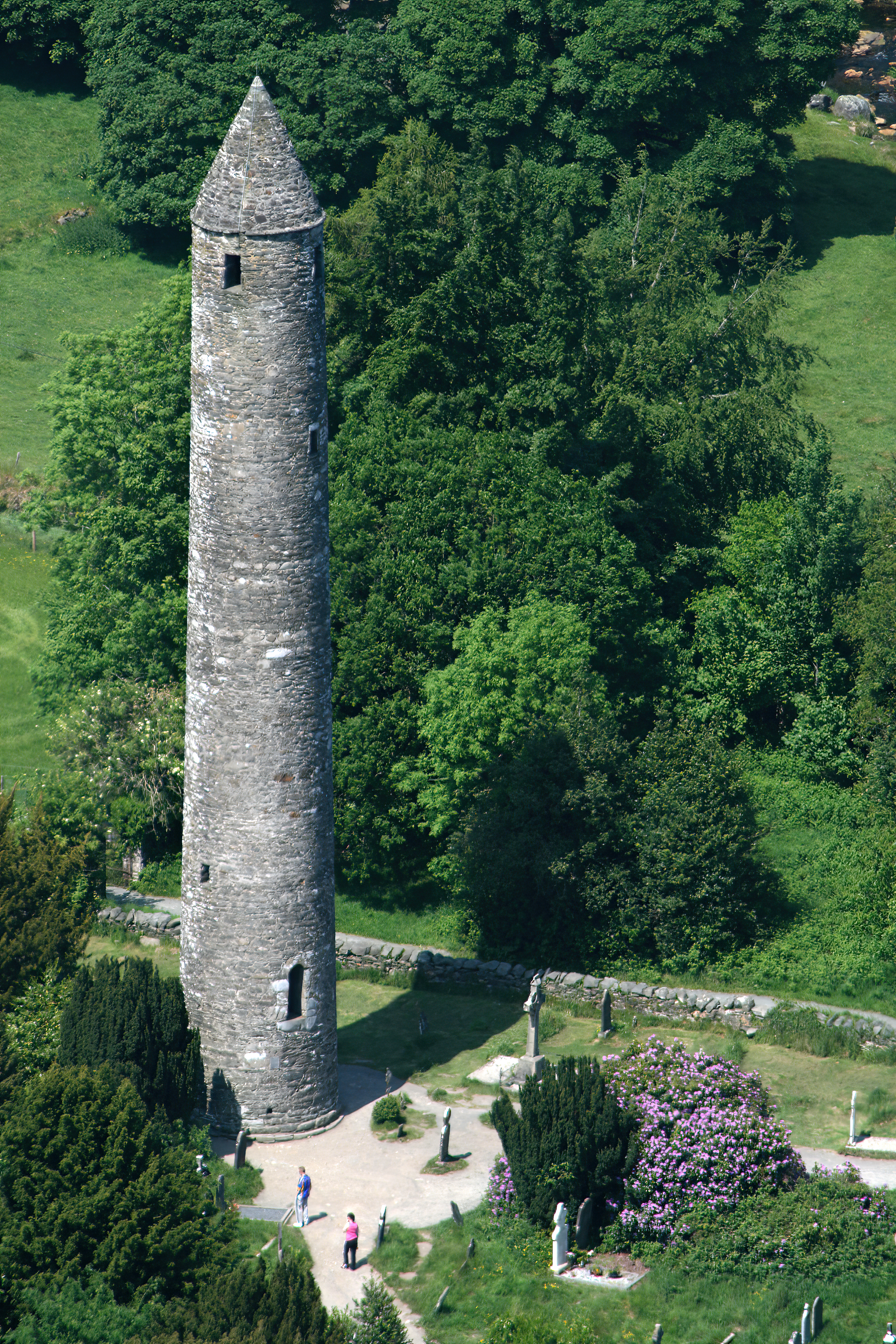
An Irish round tower, bell tower, at Glendalough, Ireland, c. 900 AD

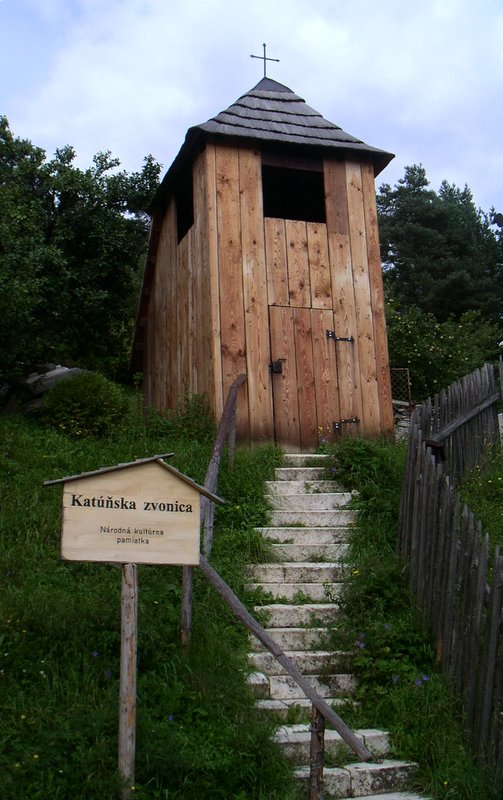
Primitive bell tower at Katúň, Slovakia (c. 12th century)

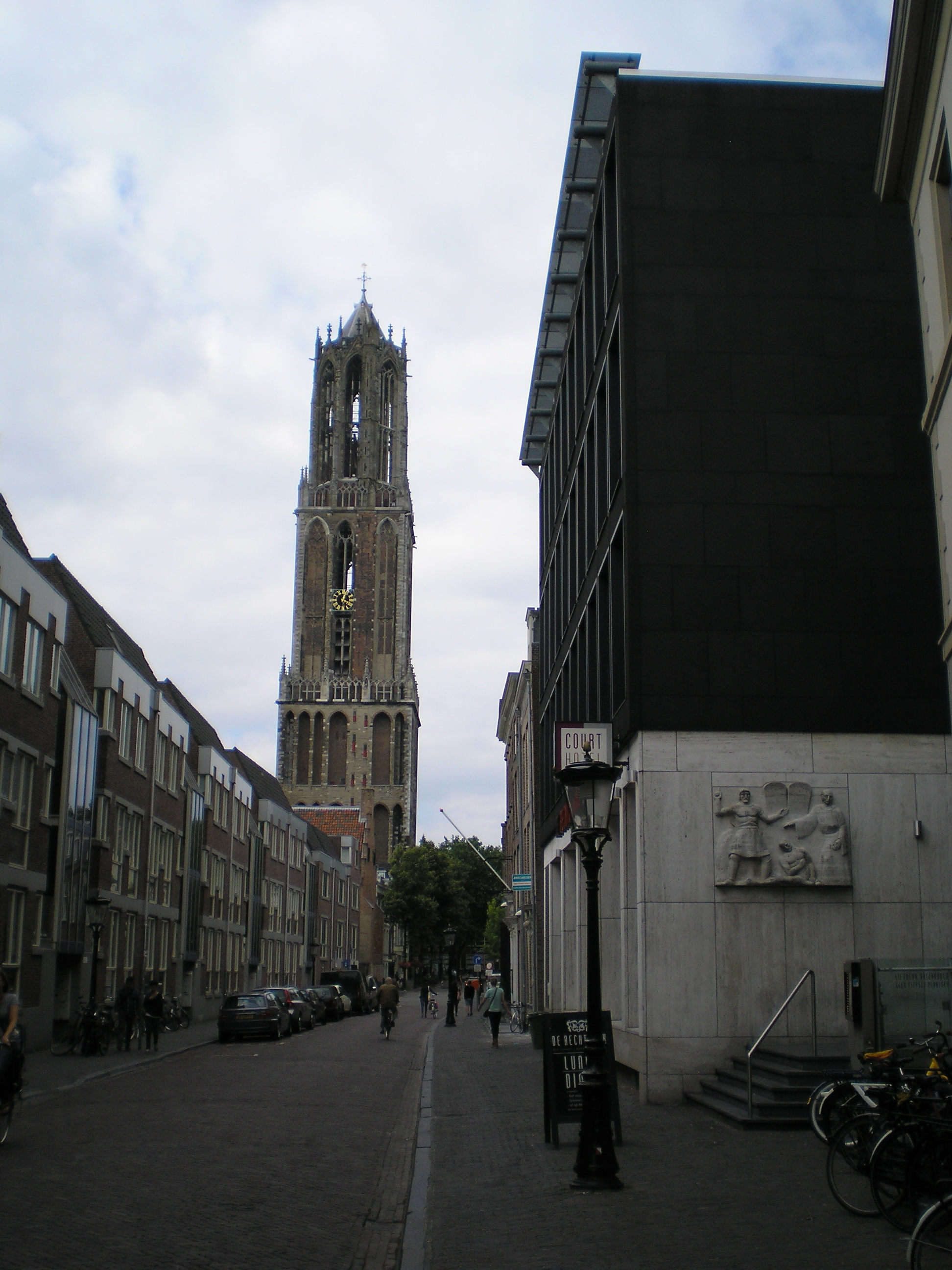
The Domtoren, bell tower of the St. Martin's Cathedral, Utrecht, Netherlands (13th century)

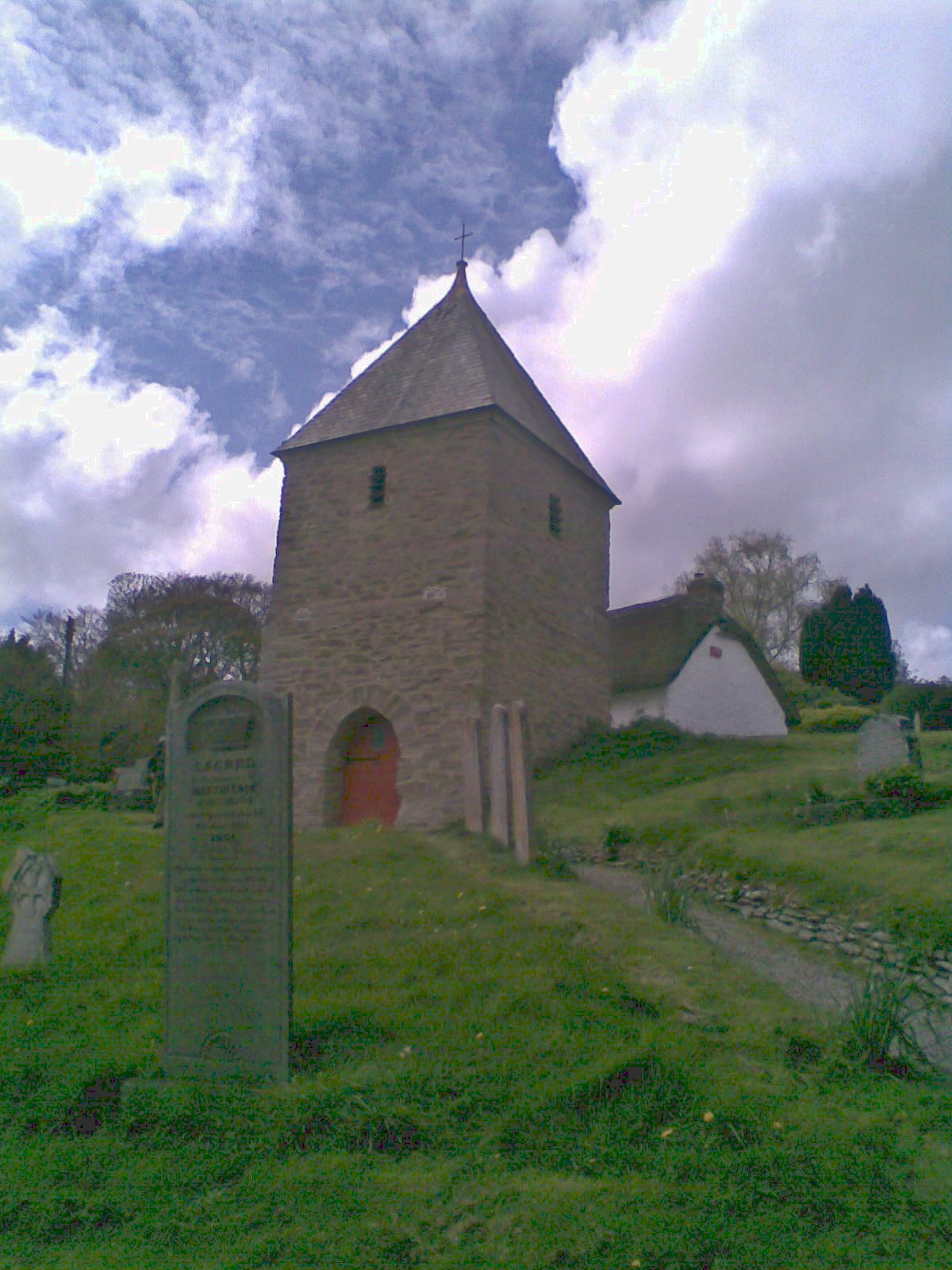
Separate bell tower at Feock Church, Cornwall (13th century)

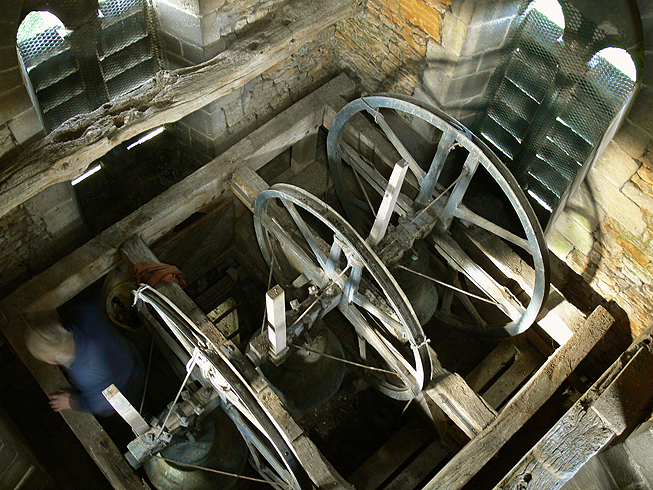
Inside the belfry of St Medard & St Gildard's, in Little Bytham in Lincolnshire, England (13th century)

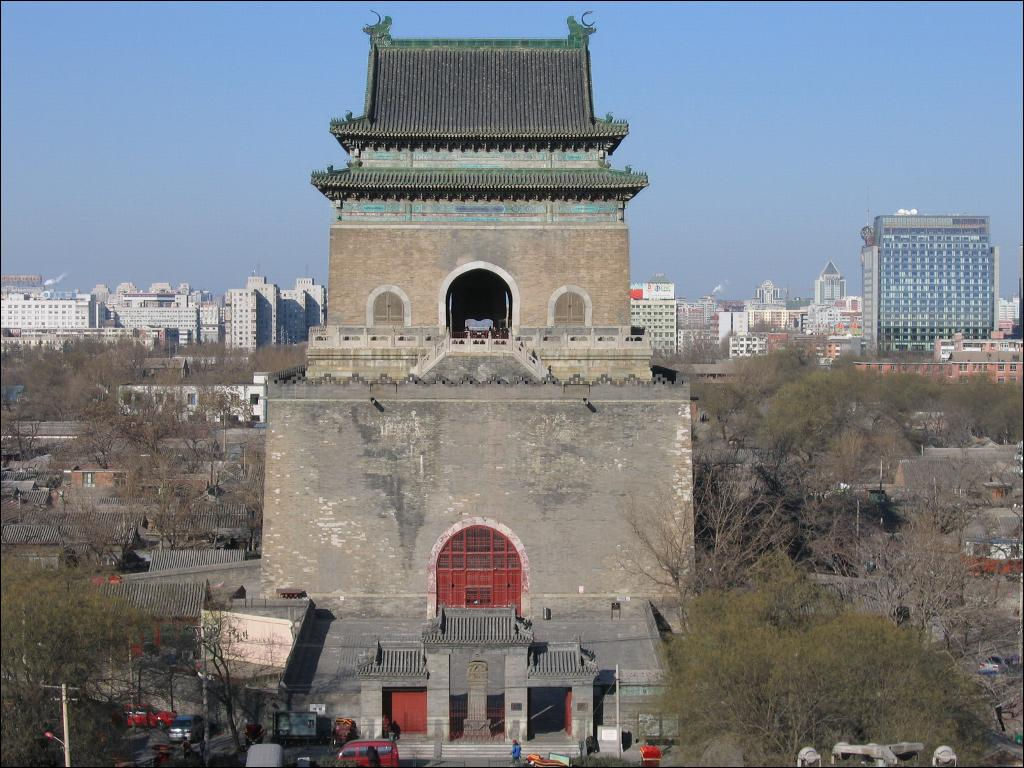
Beijing Bell Tower (1272, reconstructed 1420, 1800)

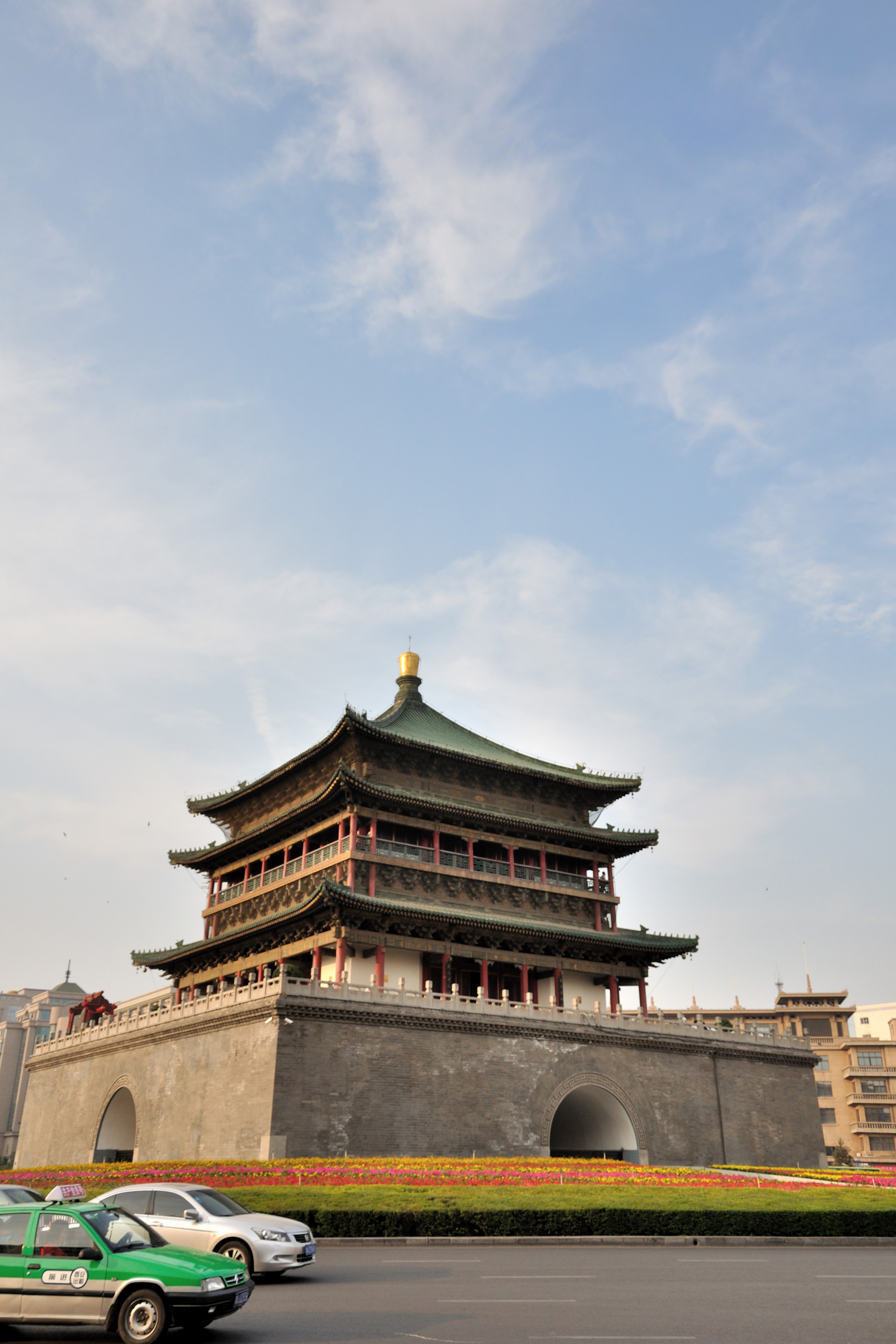
Bell Tower of Xi'an (1384)

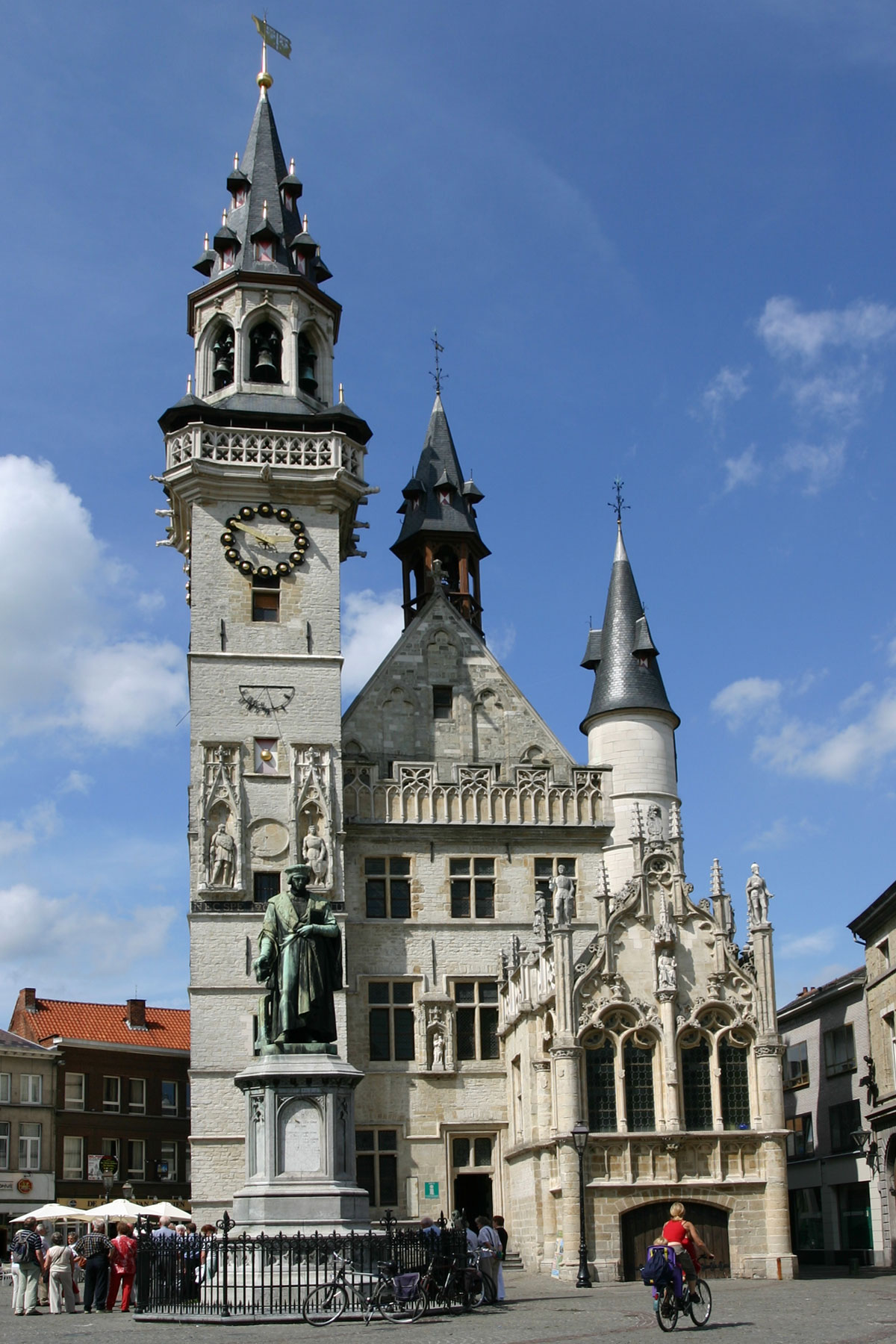
Belfry of Aalst, Belgium (1460)

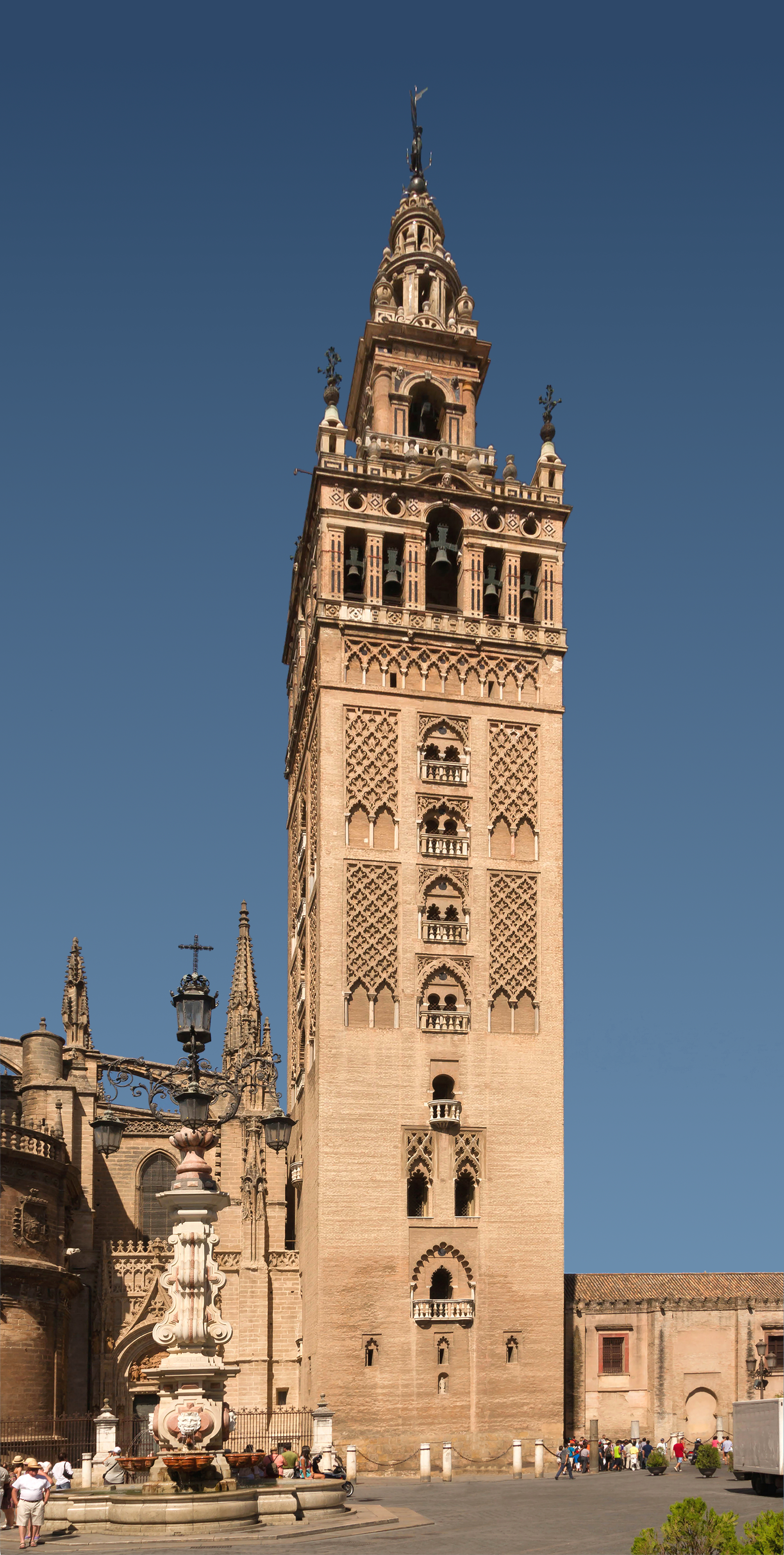
Giralda, Seville, Spain (1198, modified 1506)

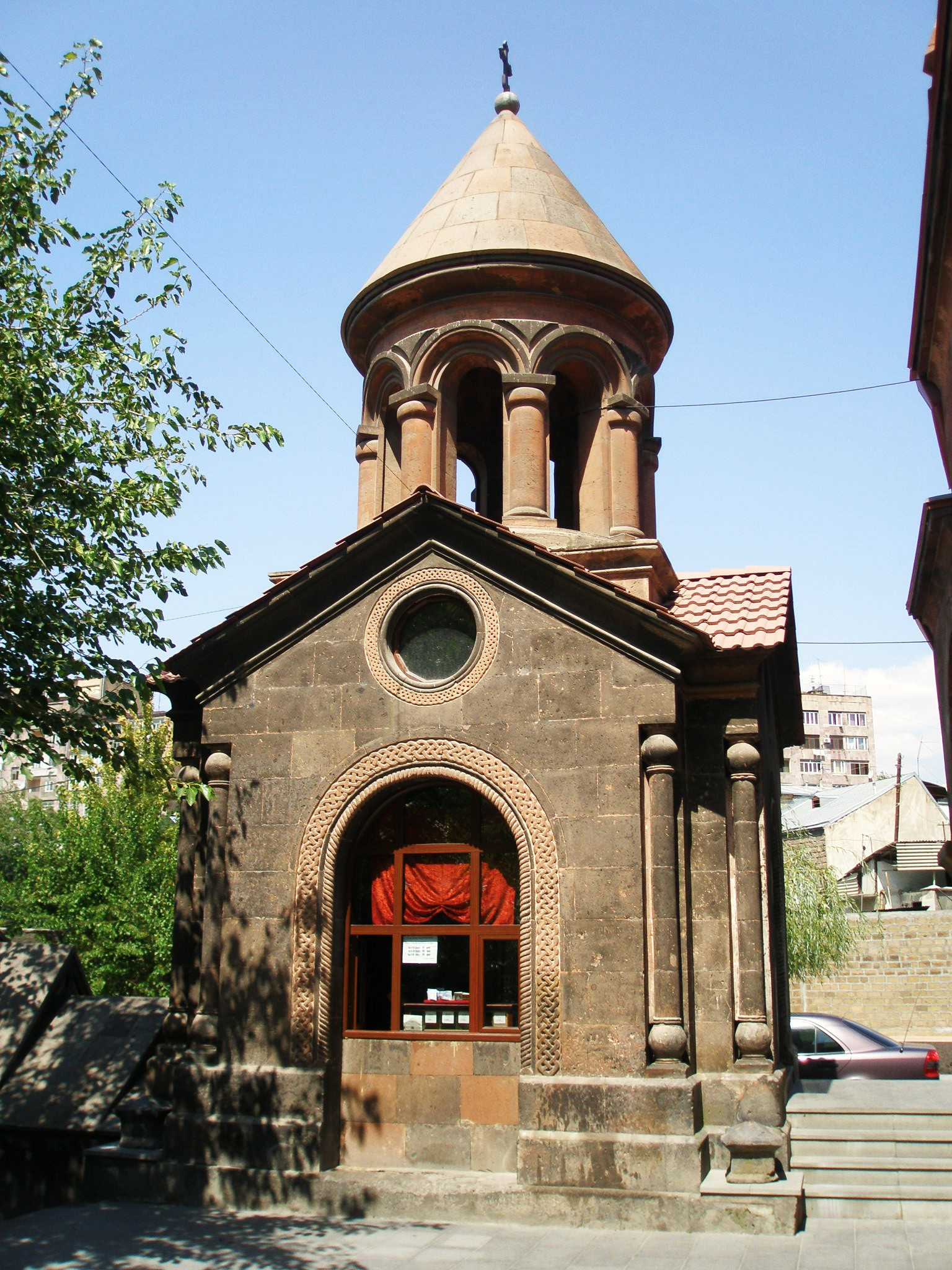
The belfry of Surb Zoravor church in Yerevan, Armenia (1693)

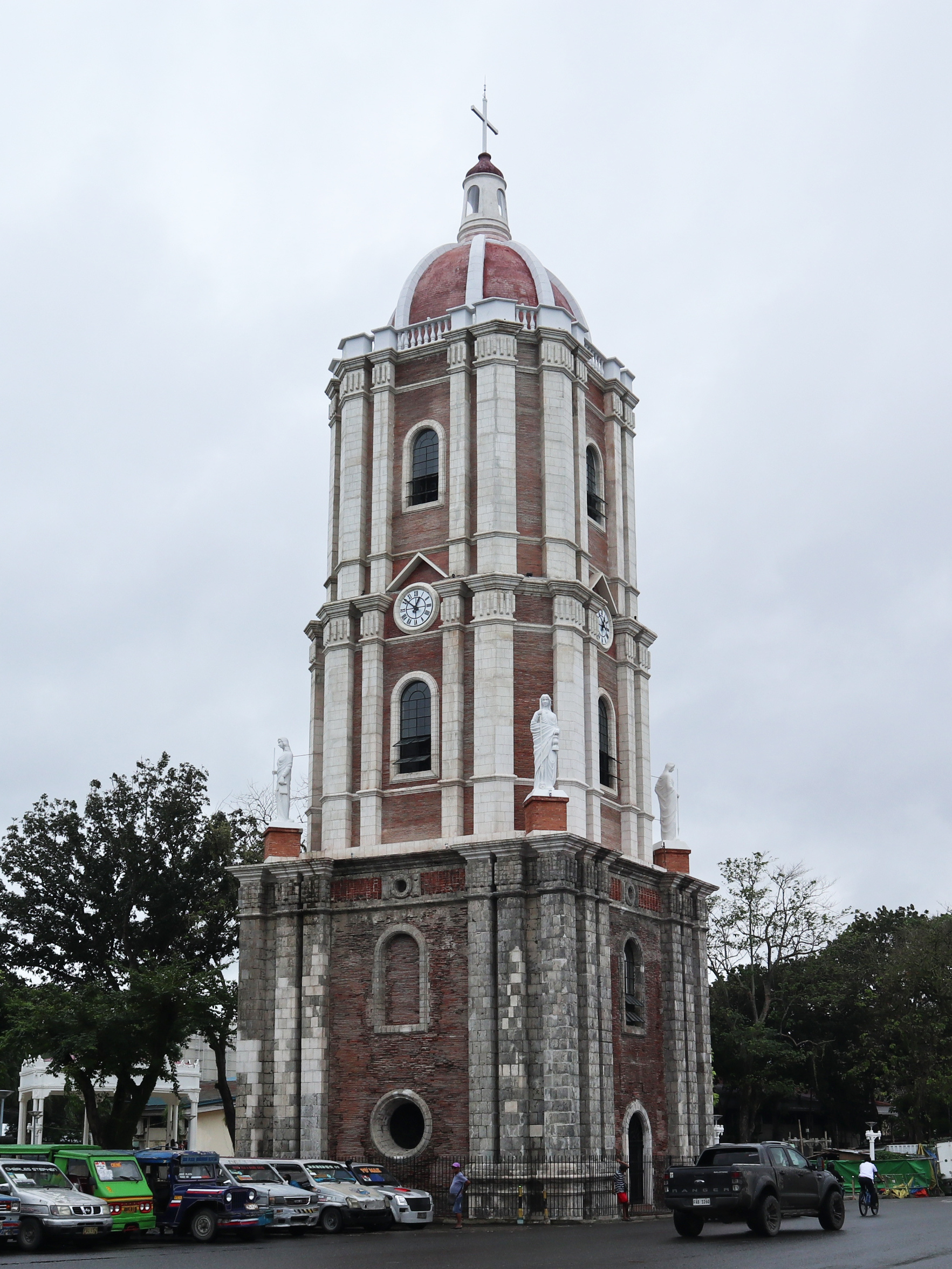
Jaro Belfry of Jaro Metropolitan Cathedral, Iloilo City, Philippines (1744)

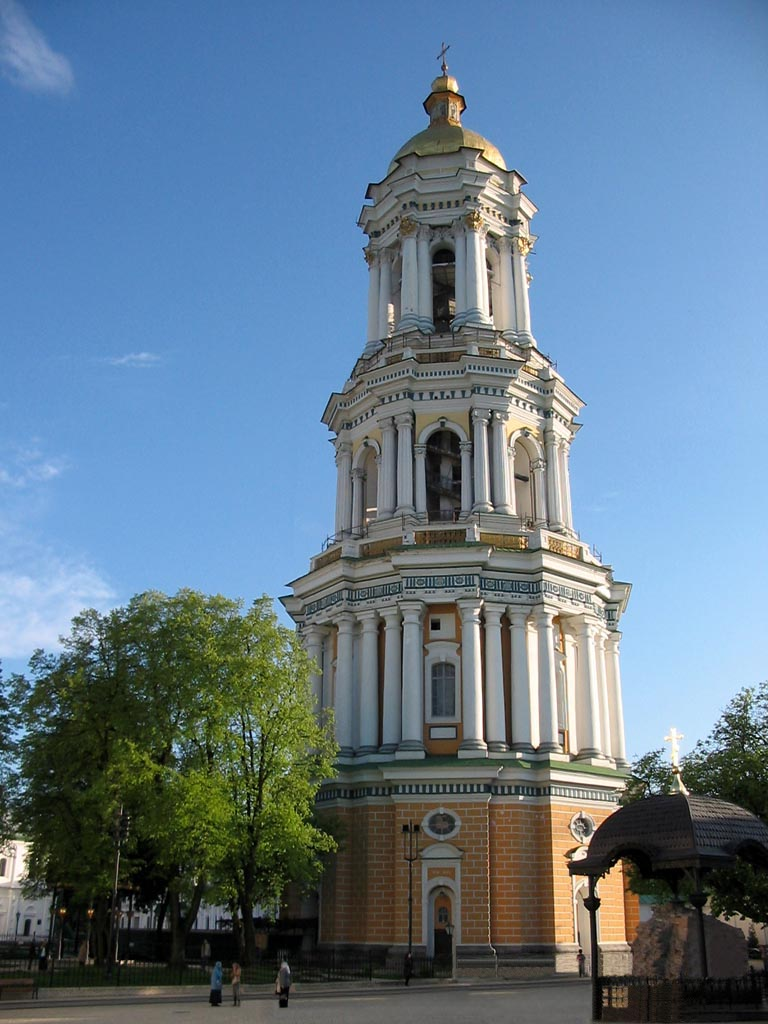
Great Lavra Bell Tower of Kyiv Pechersk Lavra, Ukraine (1745)

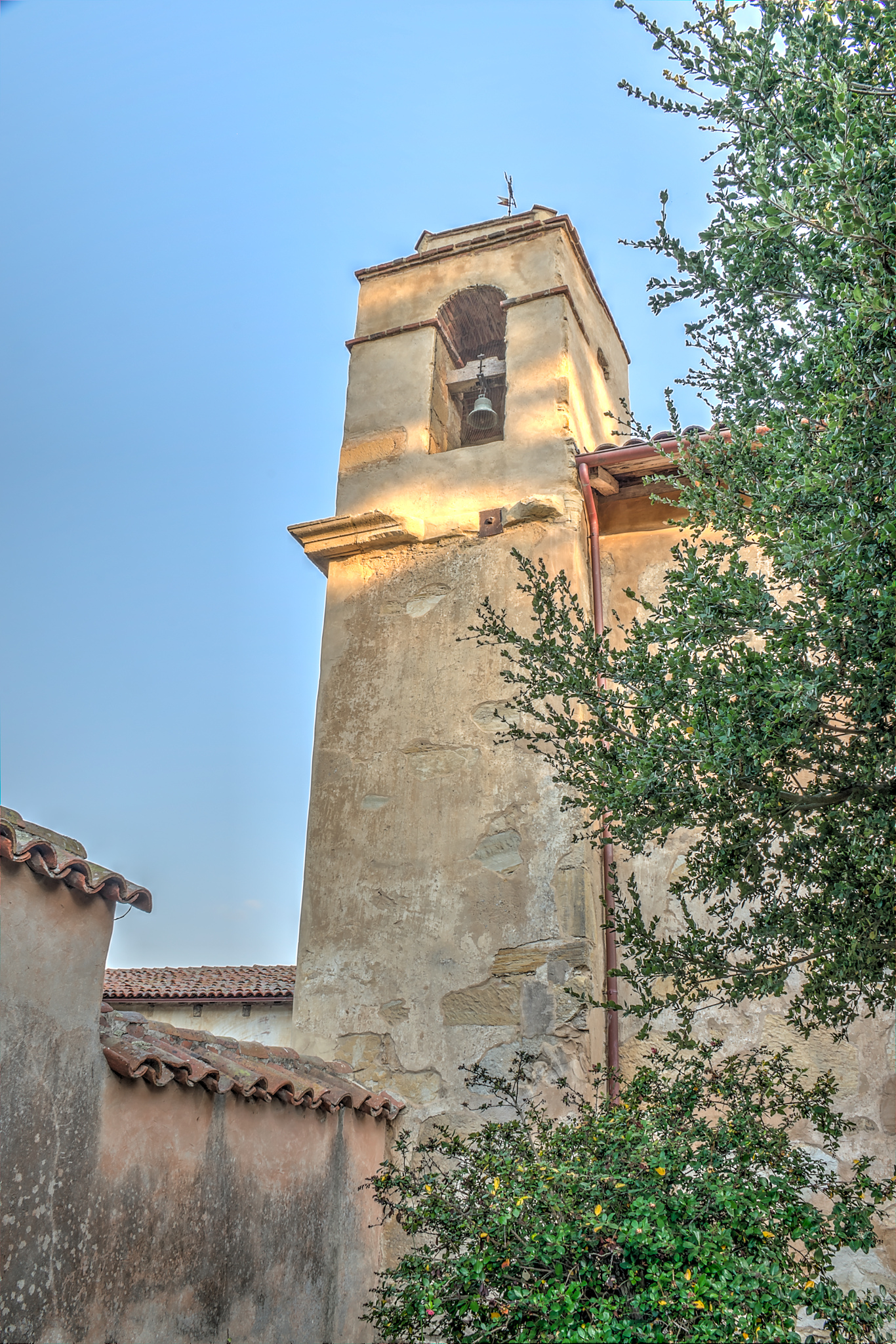
Bell tower at Mission San Carlos Borromeo de Carmelo (1797)

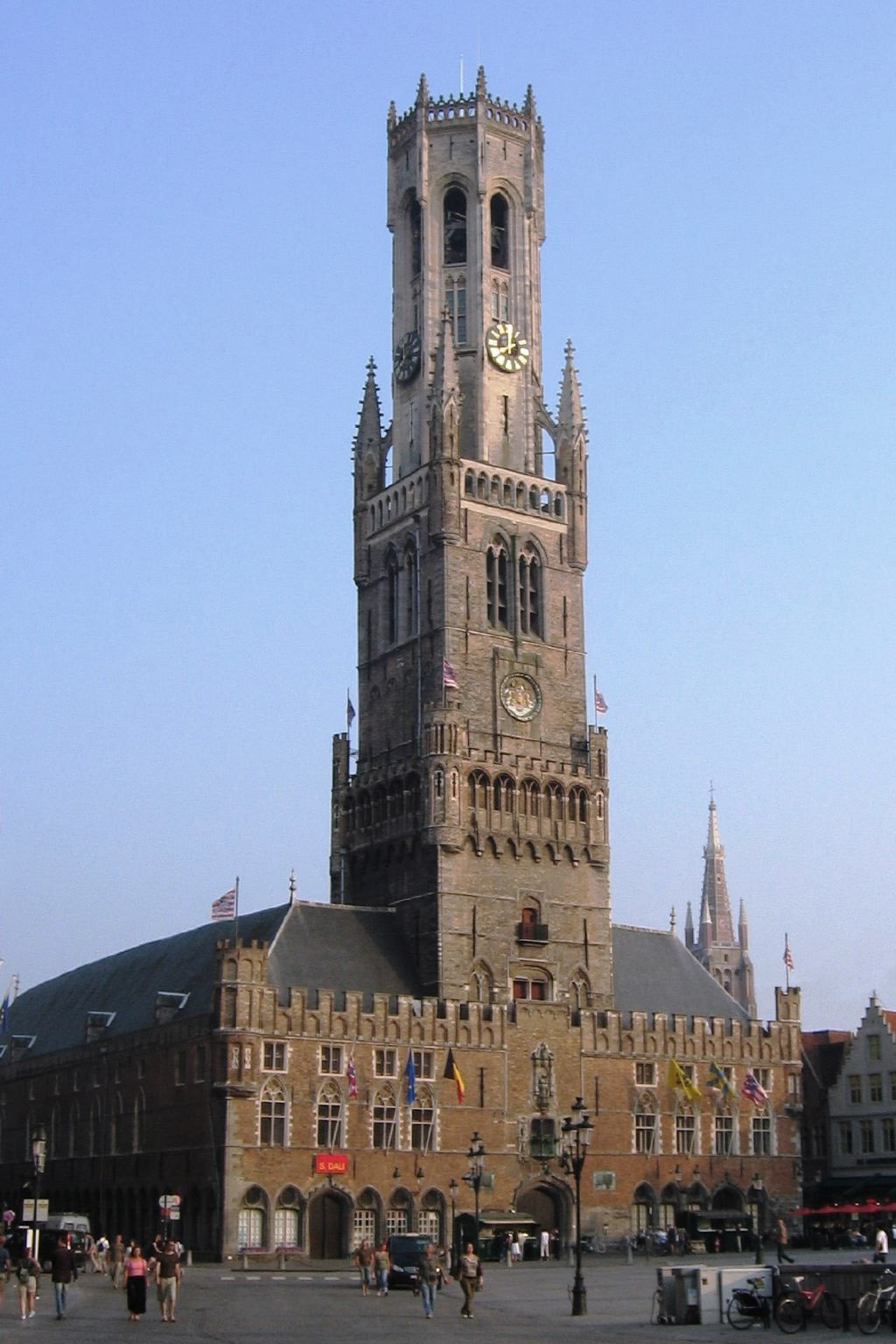
Belfry of Bruges, Belgium (1240) (modified 1480s, 1820)

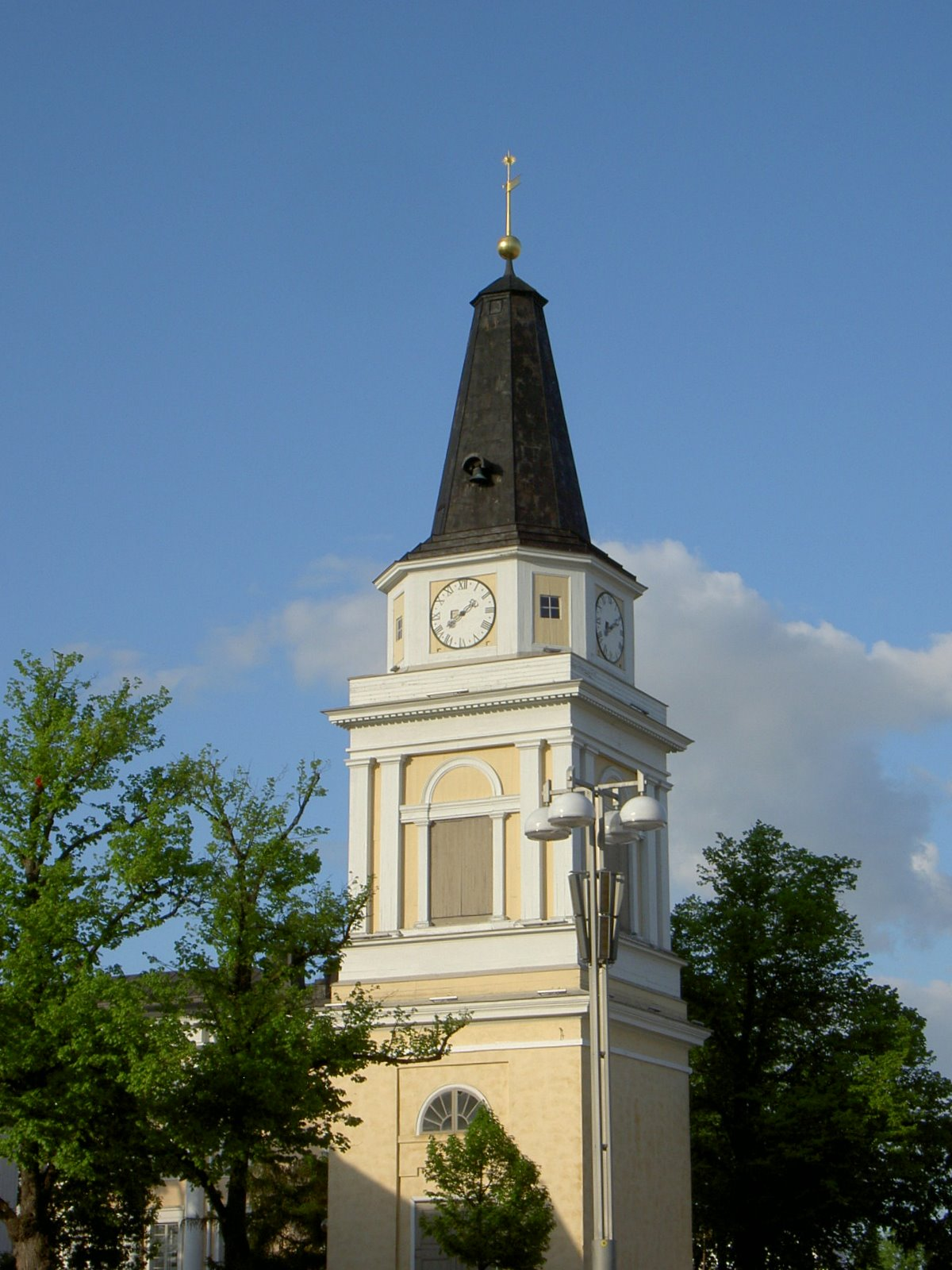
Belfry of Tampere Old Church, Finland (1828)

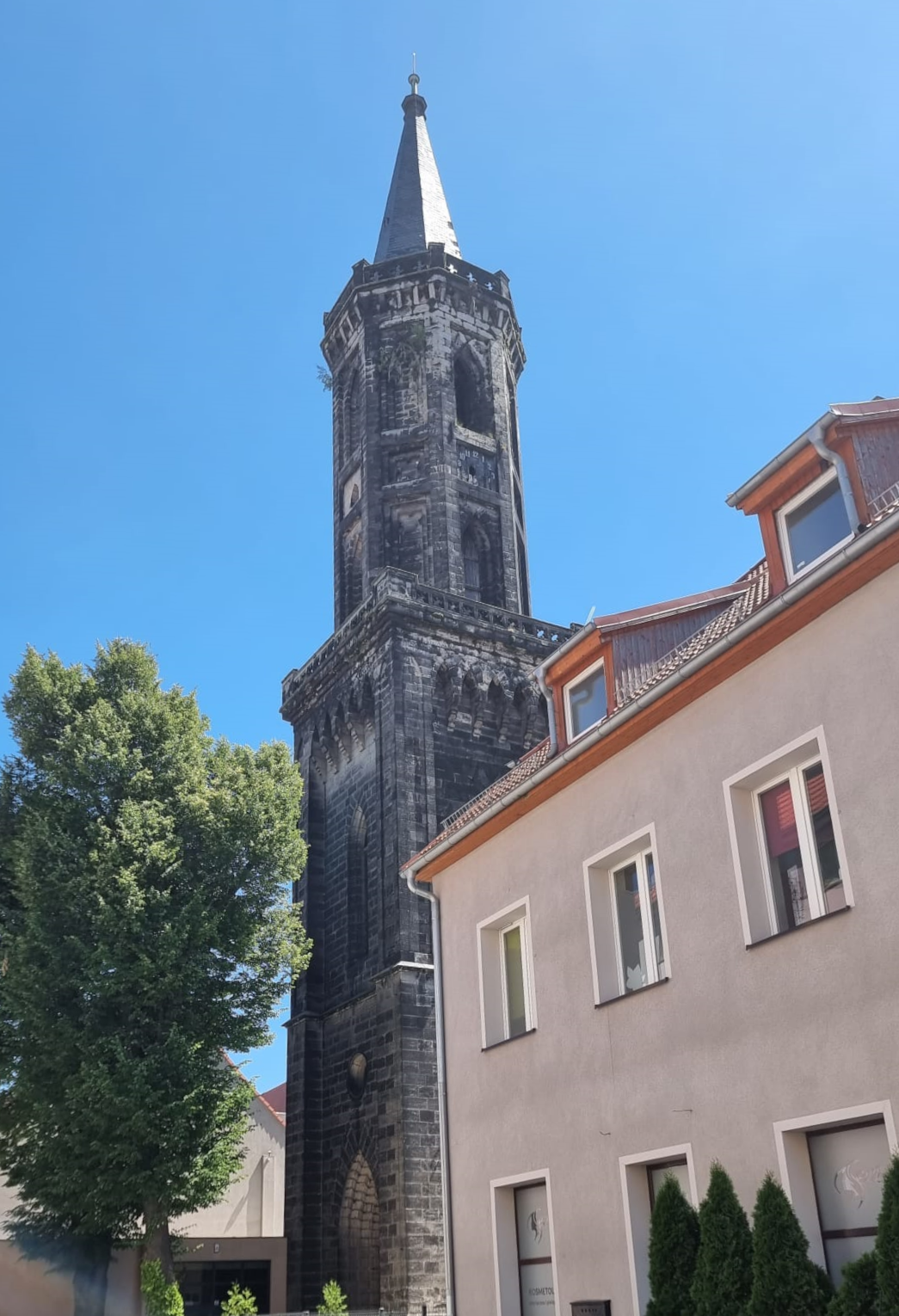
Belfry "Black Tower" of evangelical church (Lwówek Śląski, Poland) (1848)

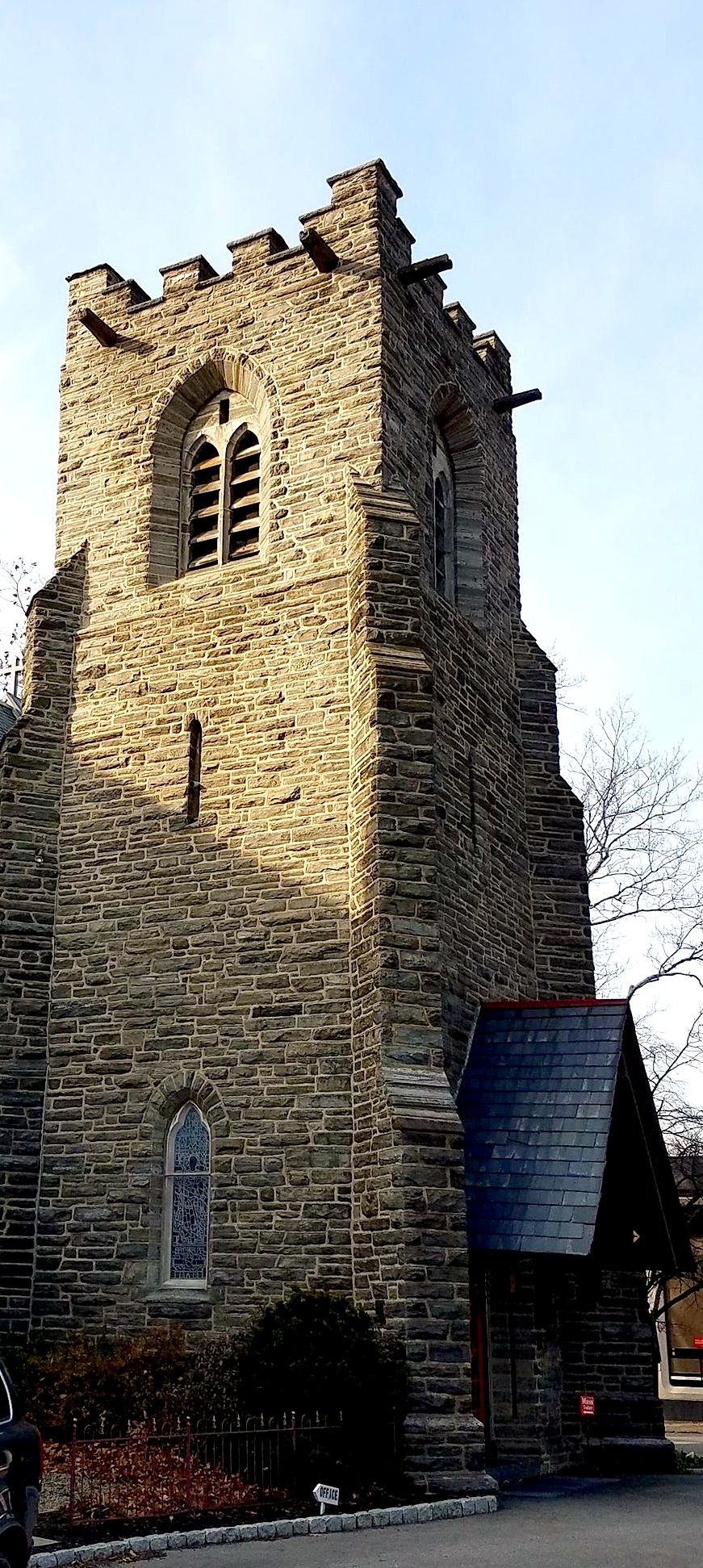
Bell Tower, Church of the Good Shepherd (Rosemont, Pennsylvania) (1894)

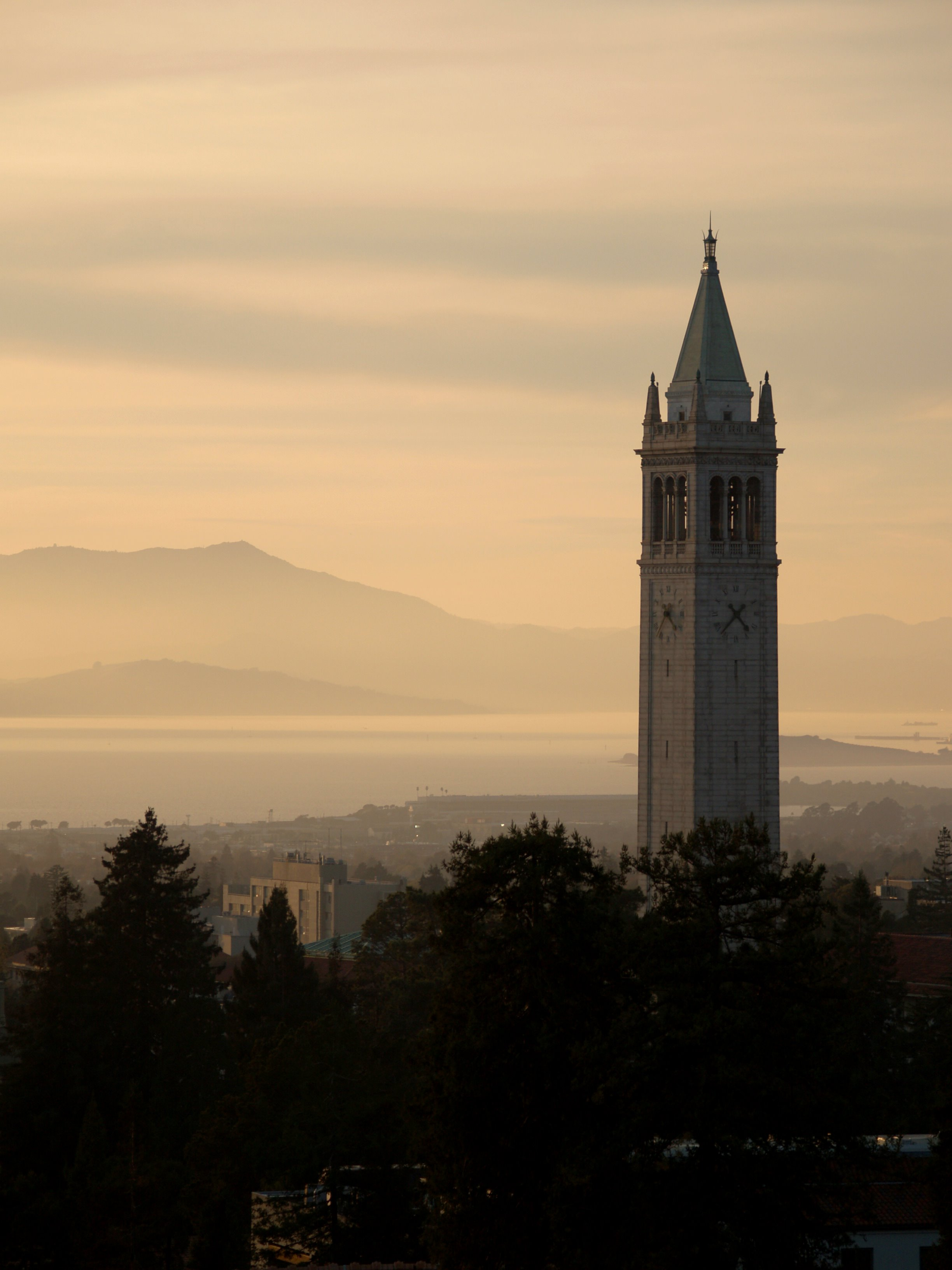
Sather Tower (more commonly known as "The Campanile"), Berkeley, CA (1914)

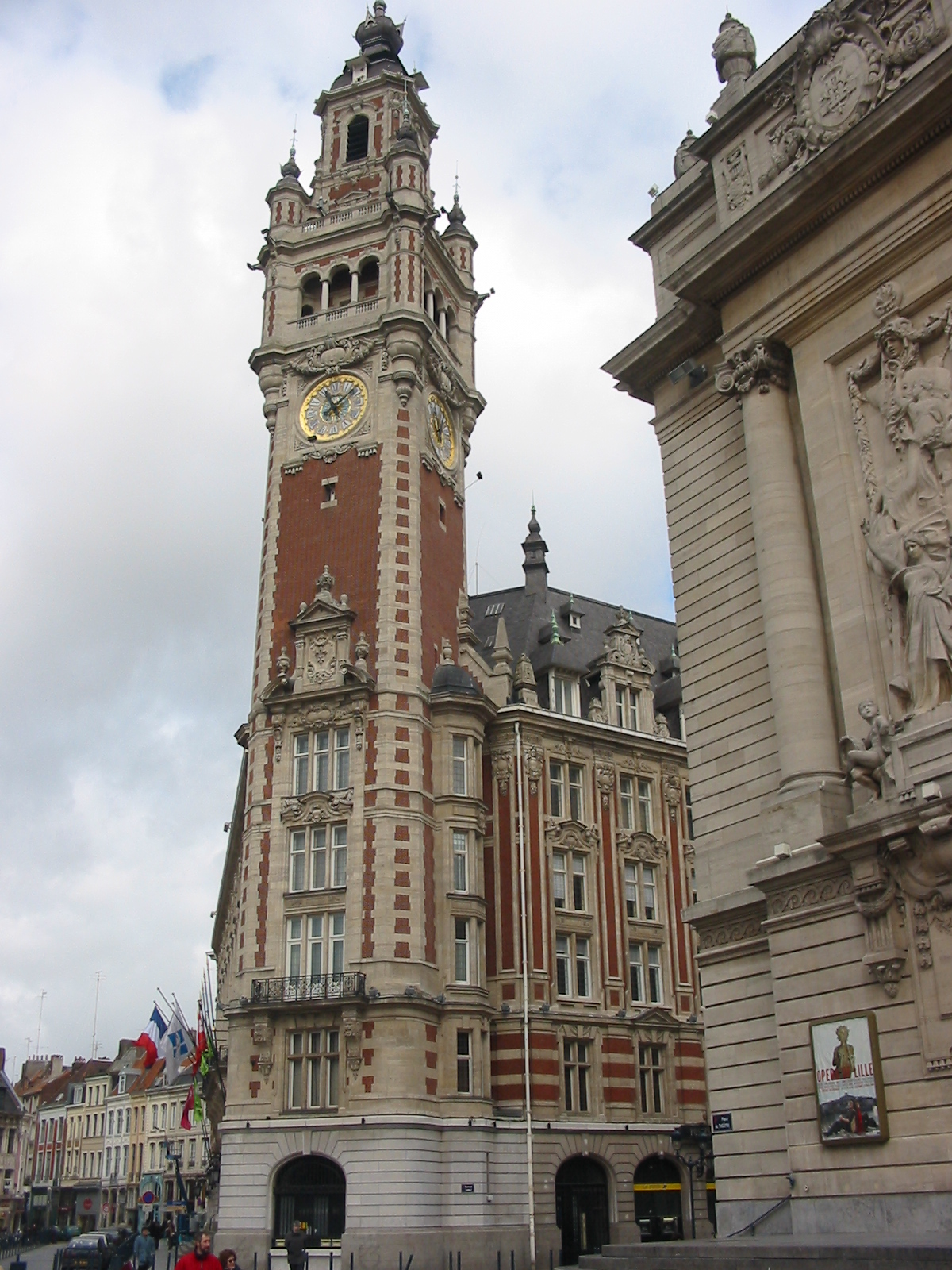
Belfry of Lille, France (1921)

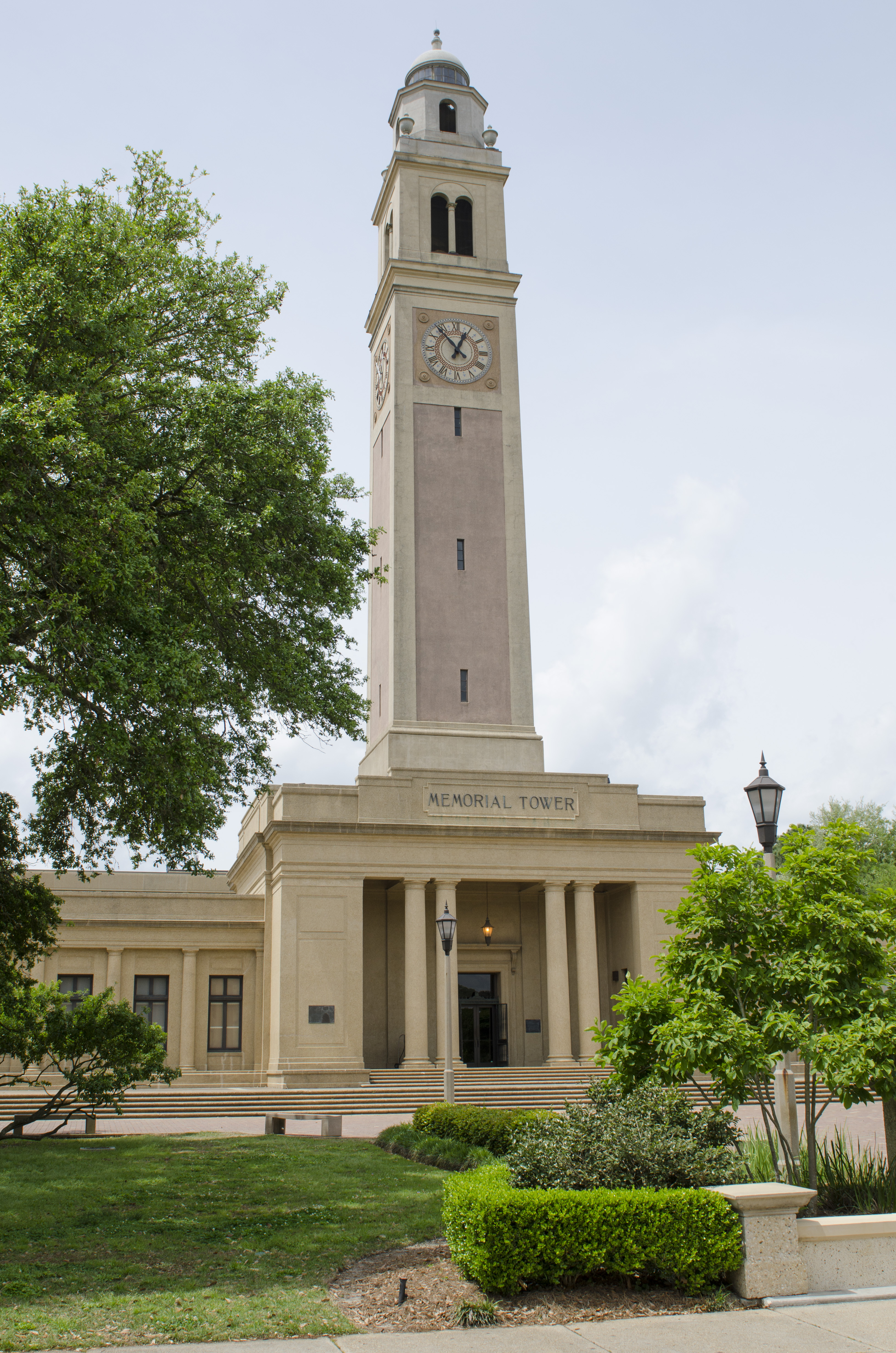
Memorial Tower at Louisiana State University, Baton Rouge, Louisiana (1923)

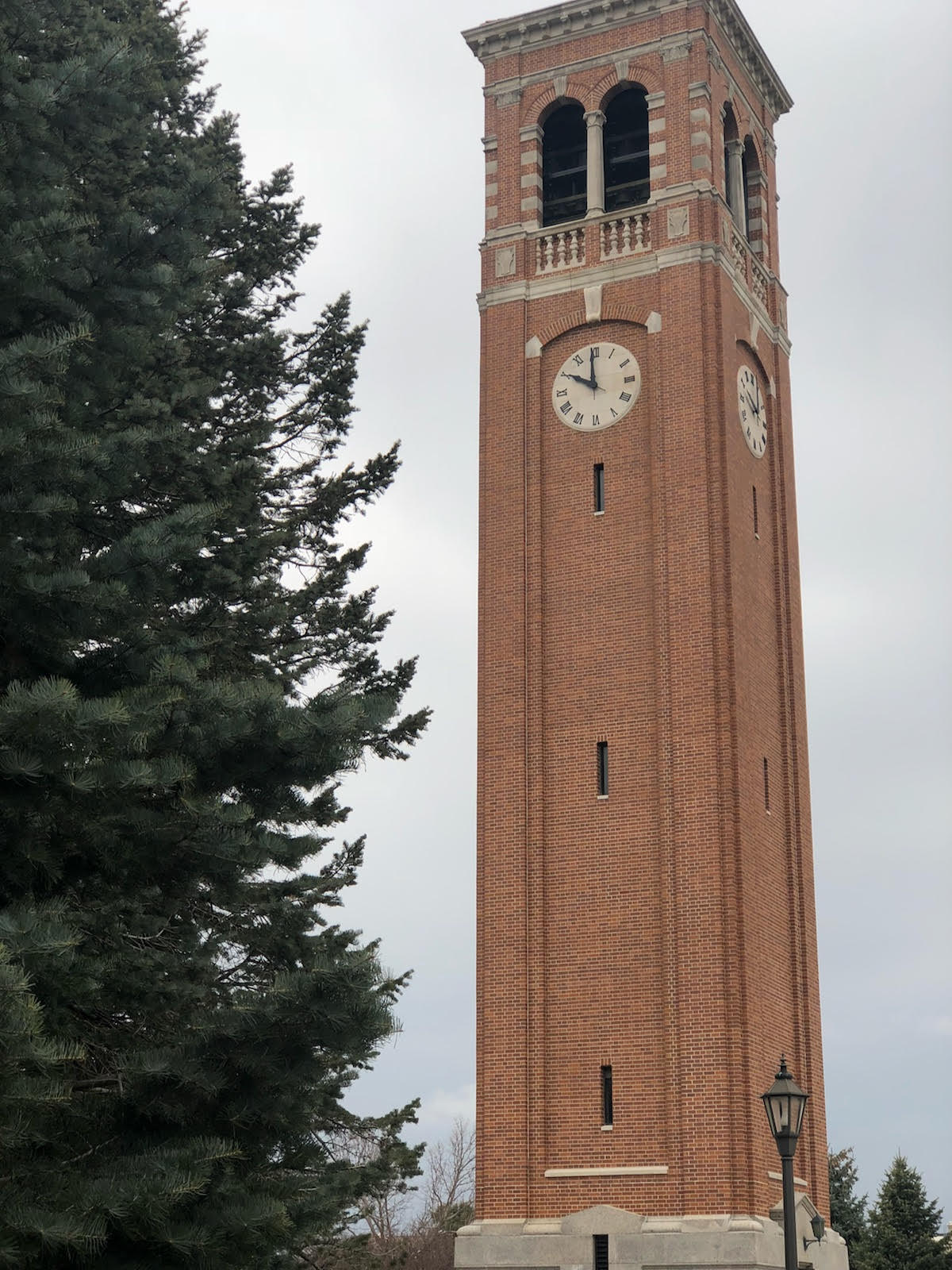
Campanile at the University of Northern Iowa (1927)

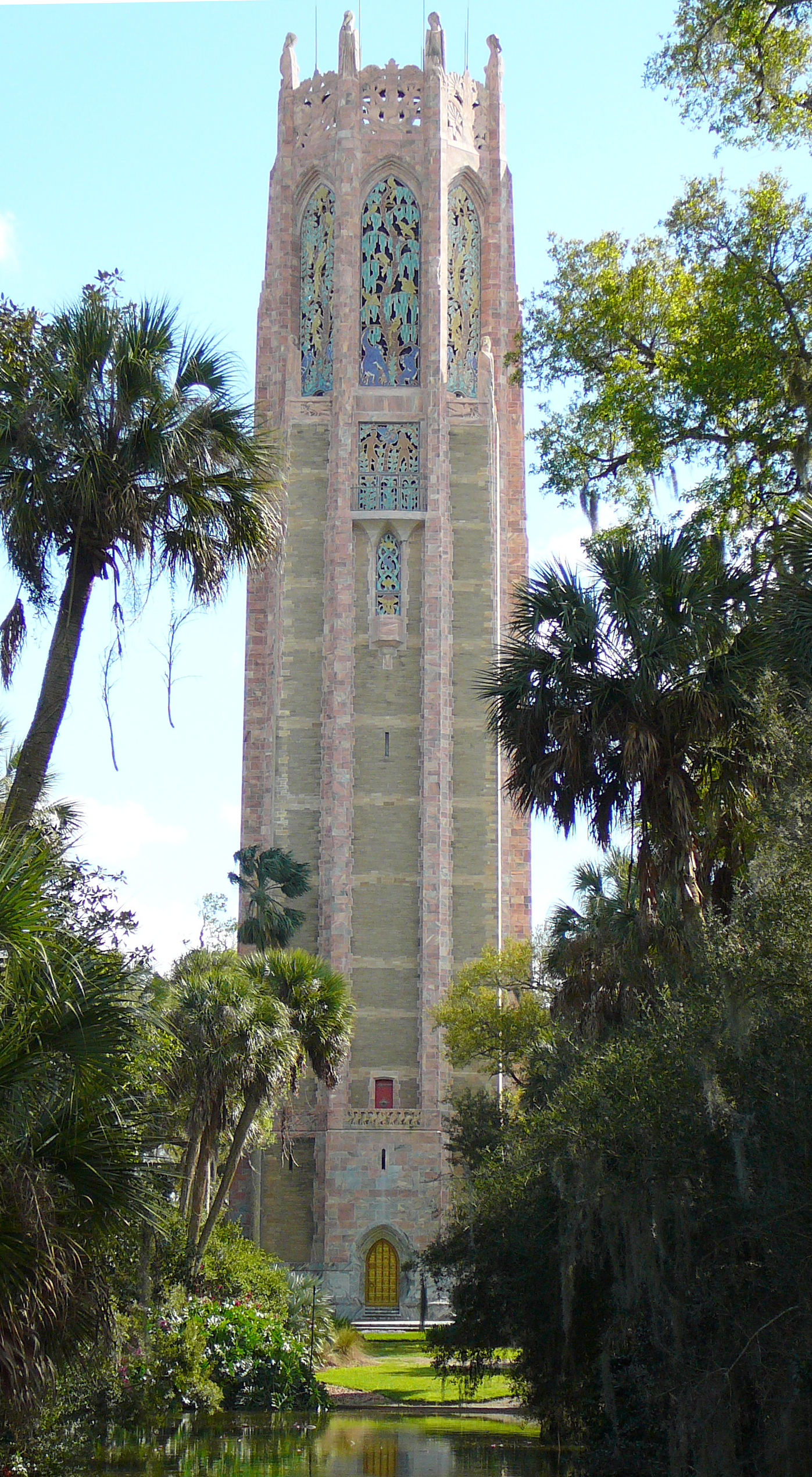
The Singing Tower at Bok Tower Gardens, Lake Wales, FL (1929)

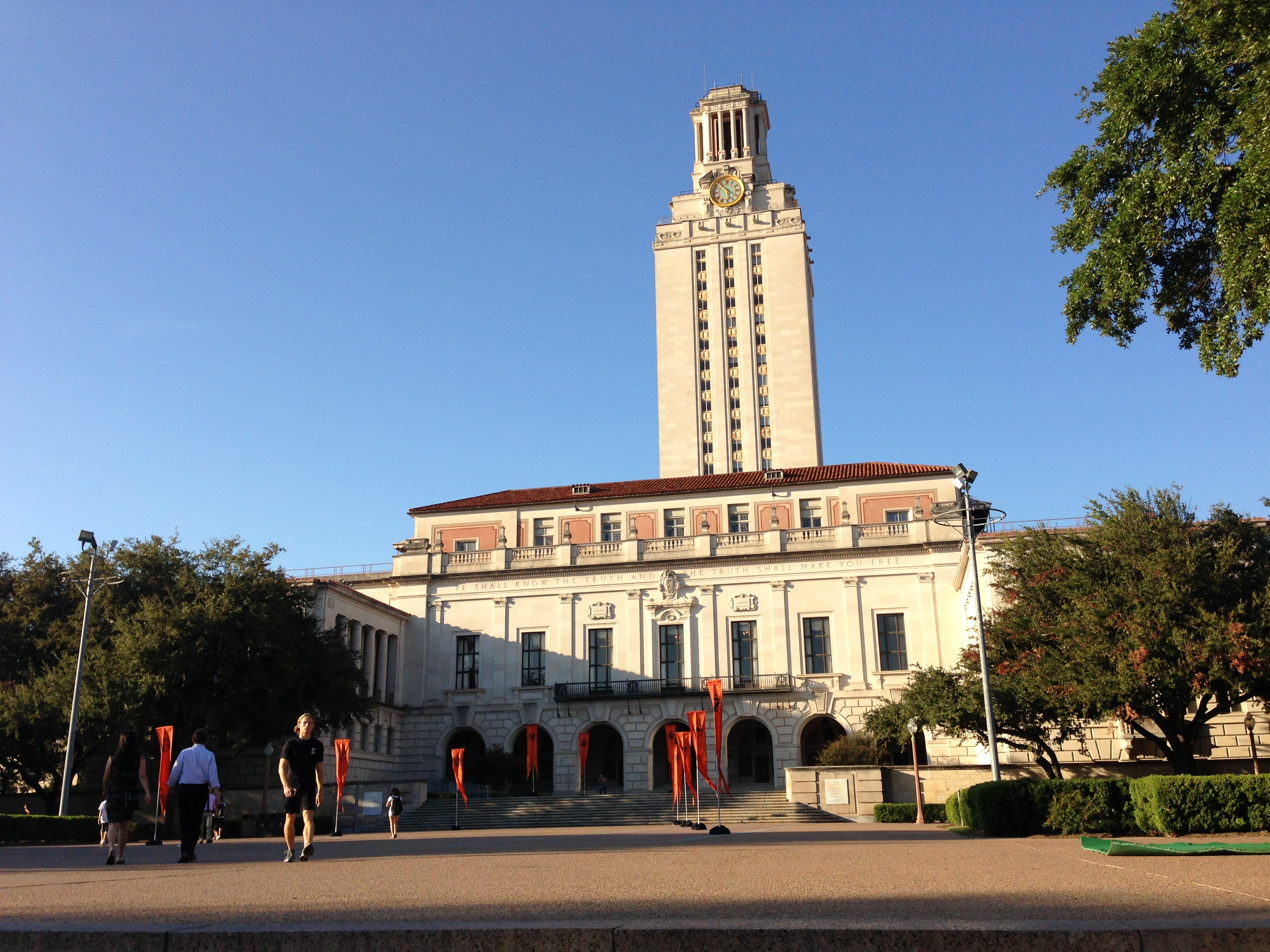
Main Building (University of Texas at Austin), Austin, TX (1937)

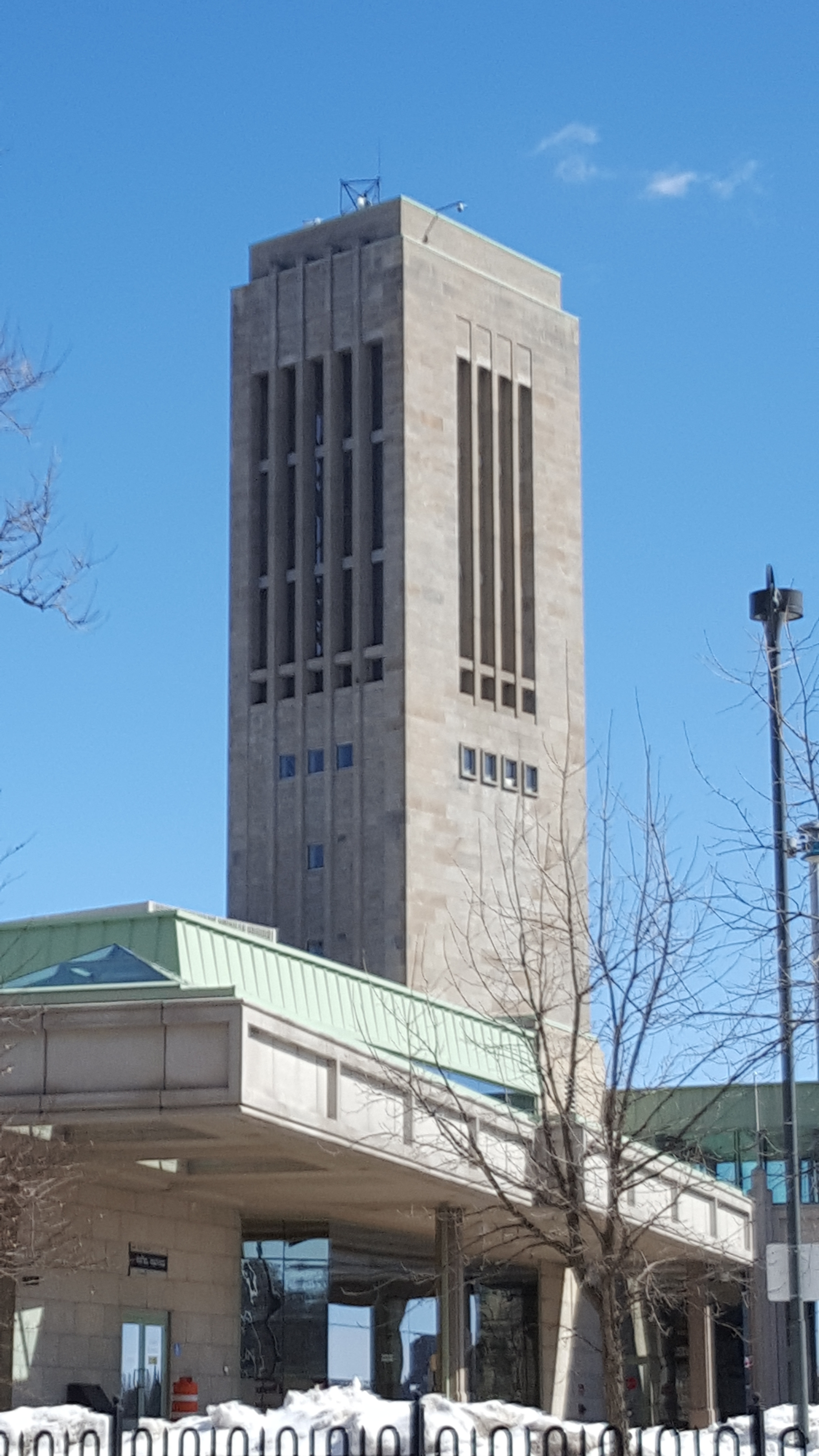
Rainbow Tower, Niagara Falls, Canada (1947)

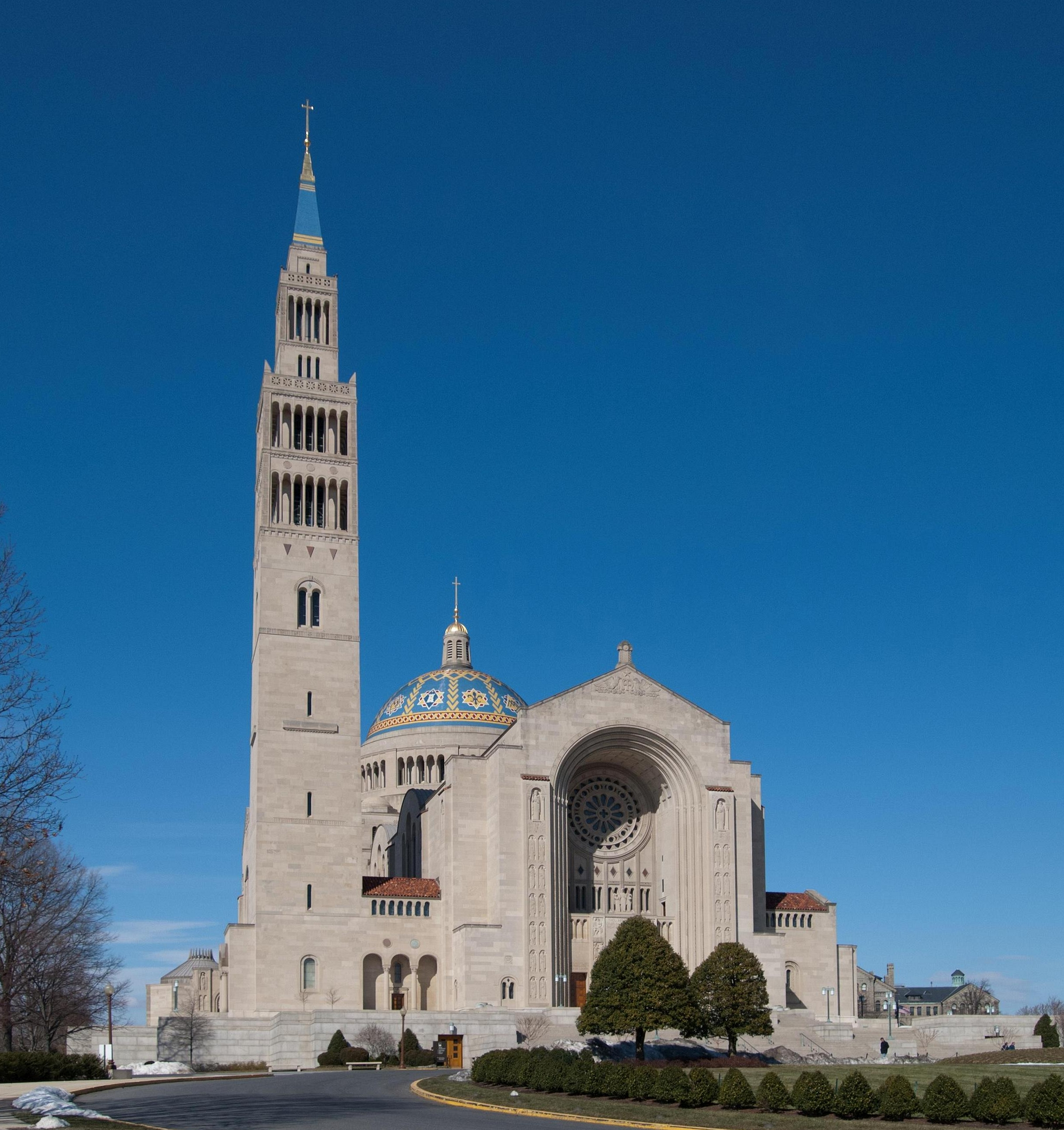
Campanile at the Basilica of the National Shrine of the Immaculate Conception, Washington, D.C., paid for by the Knights of Columbus; known as "The Knight's Tower". (1959)

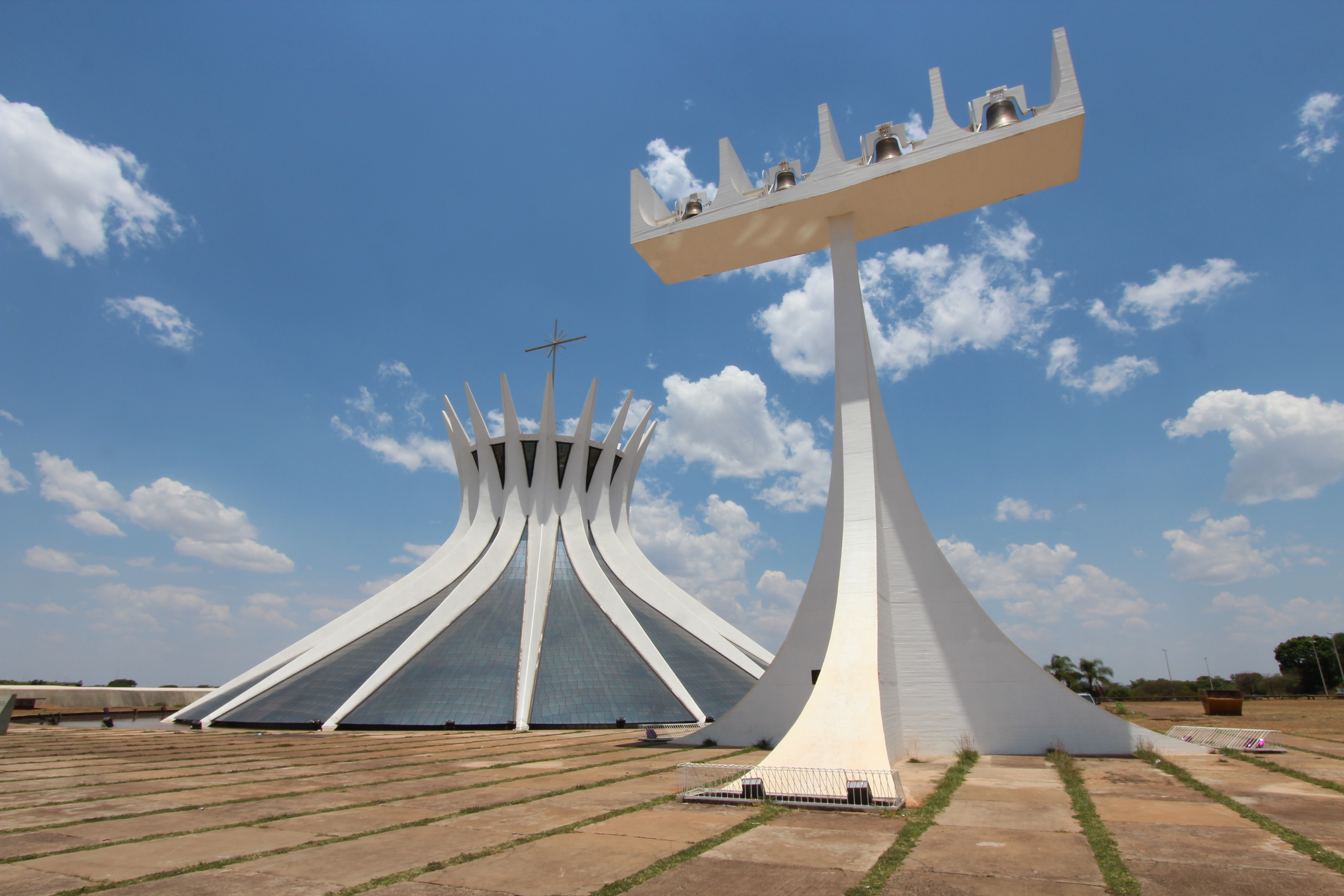
The Campanille of the Cathedral of Brasília (1970)

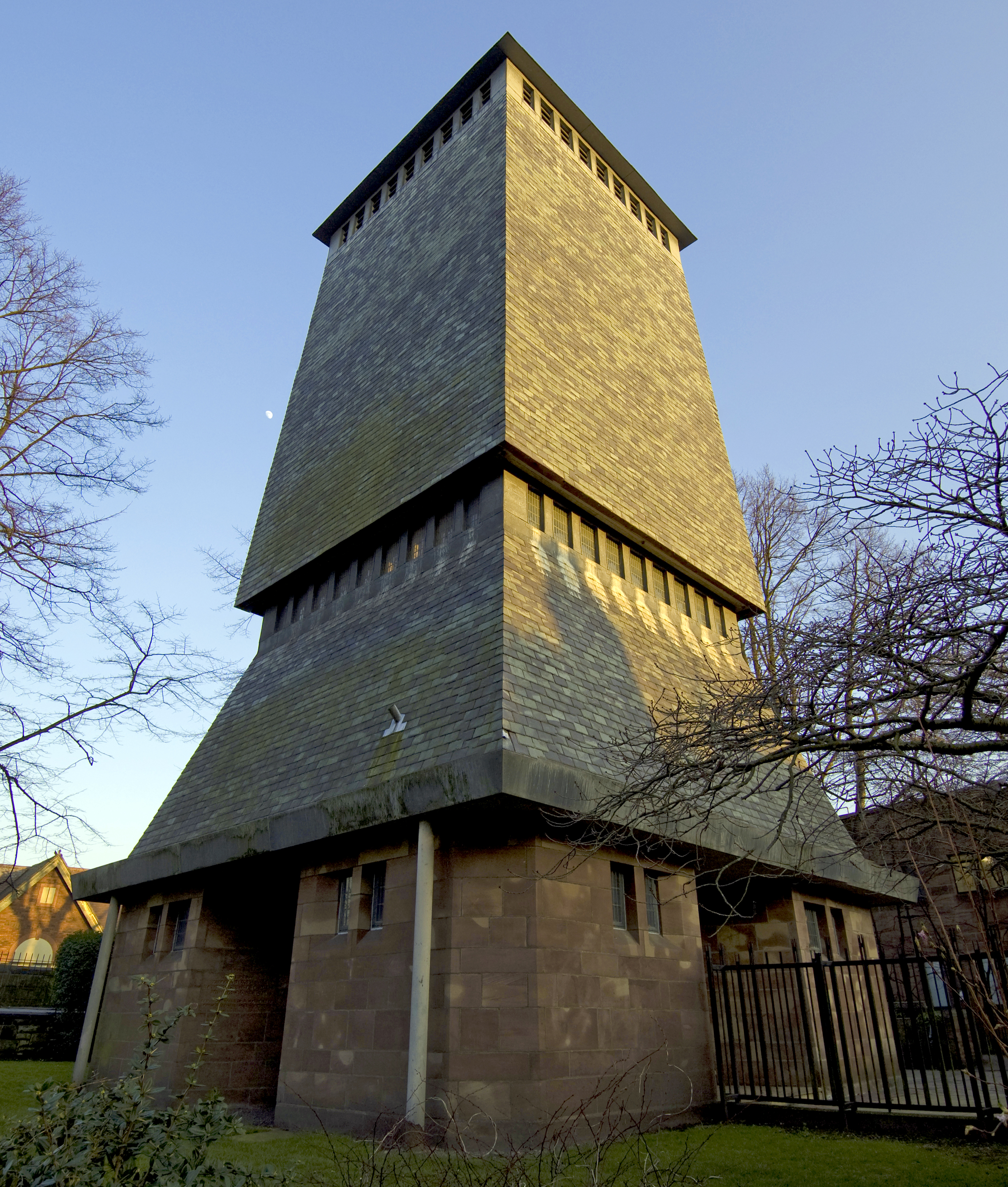
The Addleshaw Tower of Chester Cathedral, England (1973–74)

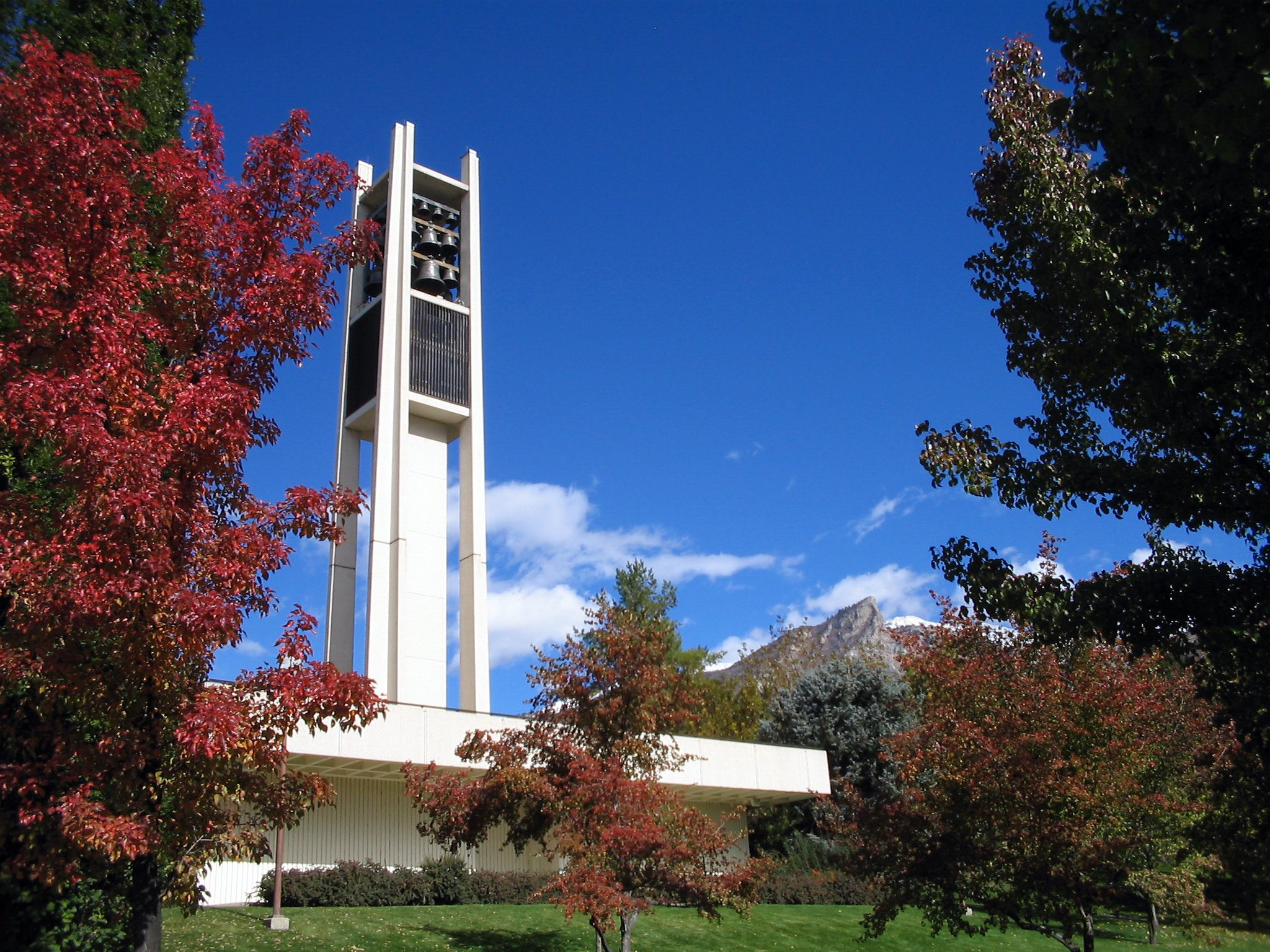
Brigham Young University Centennial Carillon Tower, Provo, Utah (1975)

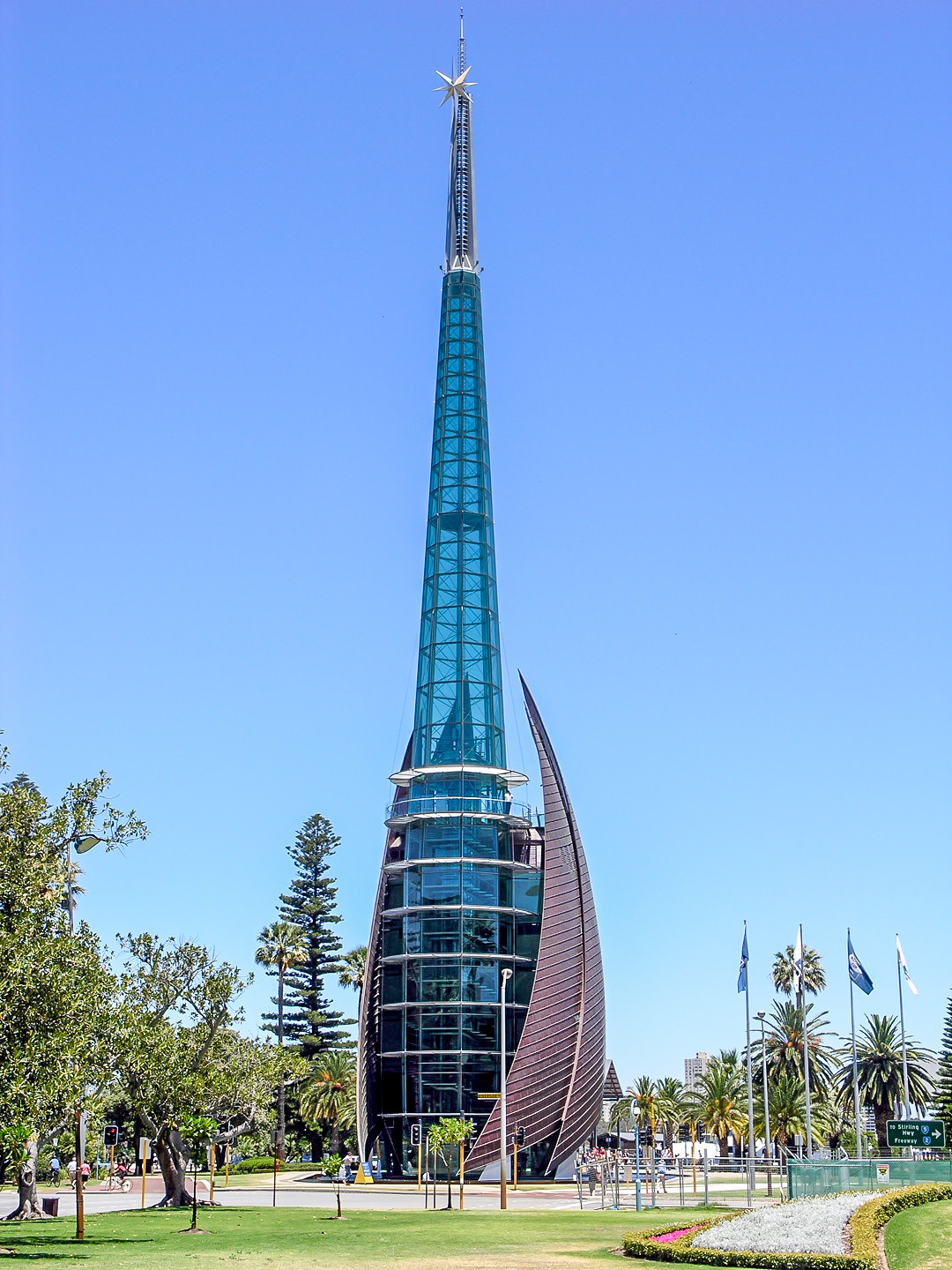
'Swan Bells', Perth, Western Australia (2000)

== See also ==
- Bell-gable
- Clock tower
- Conjuratory
- Minaret
- Octagon on cube
- Zvonnitsa
