= Katúň =

Coordinates: 48°59′N 20°44′E

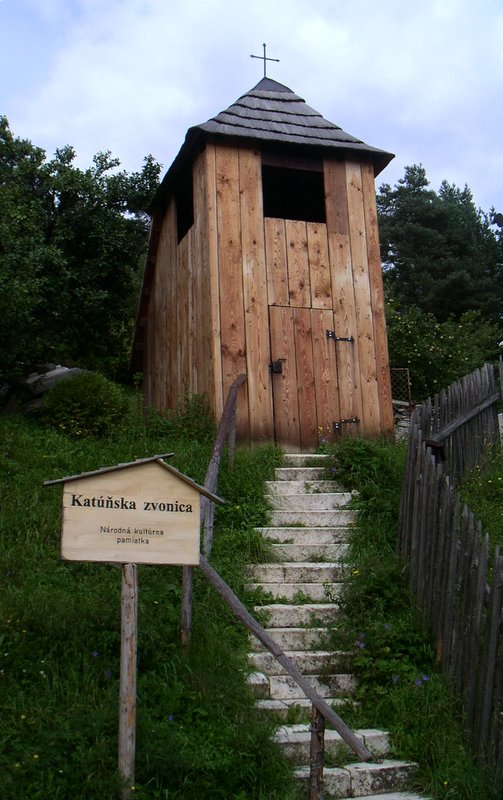
Katúň bell-tower

Katúň is a small settlement close to Spišské Podhradie, Slovakia (48° 59' N, 20° 44' E).

Coat of arms of Katúň

The settlement contains an ancient bell tower, supposed to have originated in the 12th century, which is a Slovak national monument.
