= Pedro Santorromán =

Spanish politician

Pedro Santorromán Lacambra (born 1956, Abizanda, died May 21, 2005, Zaragoza) was a Spanish politician, belonging to the Spanish Socialist Workers' Party. He died of a heart attack at the age of 49. At the time of his death he served as senator and mayor of Abizanda (a post he held since 1991).

In 2012 a street was named and a monolith erected in his honour in Abizanda.
