= Fanlo =

- Municipality
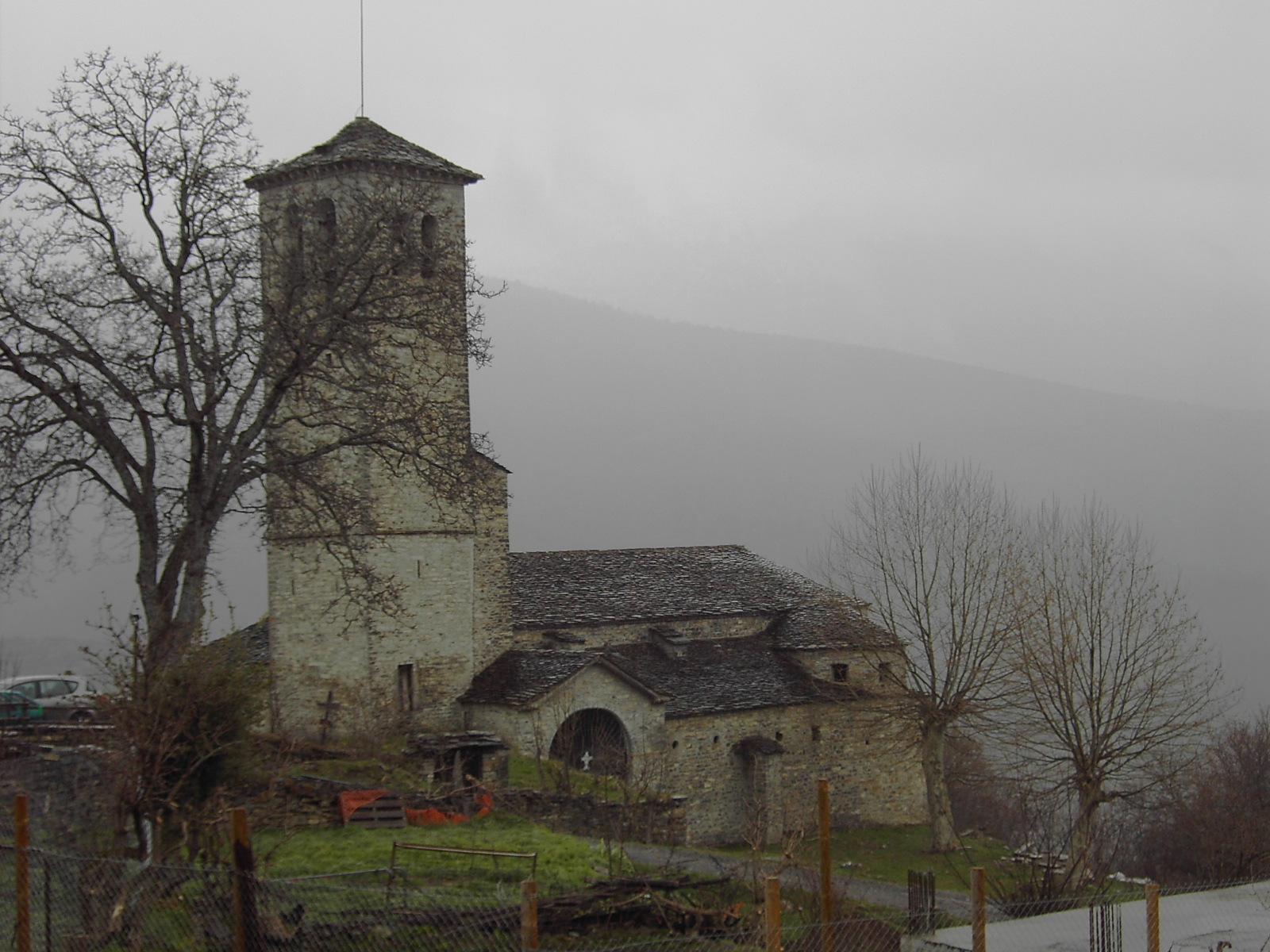
- The Church of Fanlo under the blizzard

- Coat of arms

- Location of Fanlo within Aragon Location of Fanlo within Spain
- Coordinates: 42°35′N 0°01′W
- Country: Spain
- Autonomous community: Aragon
- Province: Huesca
- Comarca: Sobrarbe

Area
  - Total: 187.10 km^{2} (72.24 sq mi)
- Elevation: 1,342 m (4,403 ft)

Population (2025-01-01)
  - Total: 114
  - Density: 0.609/km^{2} (1.58/sq mi)
- Time zone: UTC+1 (CET)
  - Summer (DST): UTC+2 (CEST)

Fanlo is a municipality located in the province of Huesca, Aragon, Spain. According to the 2004 census (INE), the municipality had a population of 172 inhabitants.

== List of villages included in the municipality ==
- Buerba
- Buisán
- Ceresuela
- Nerín
- Yeba

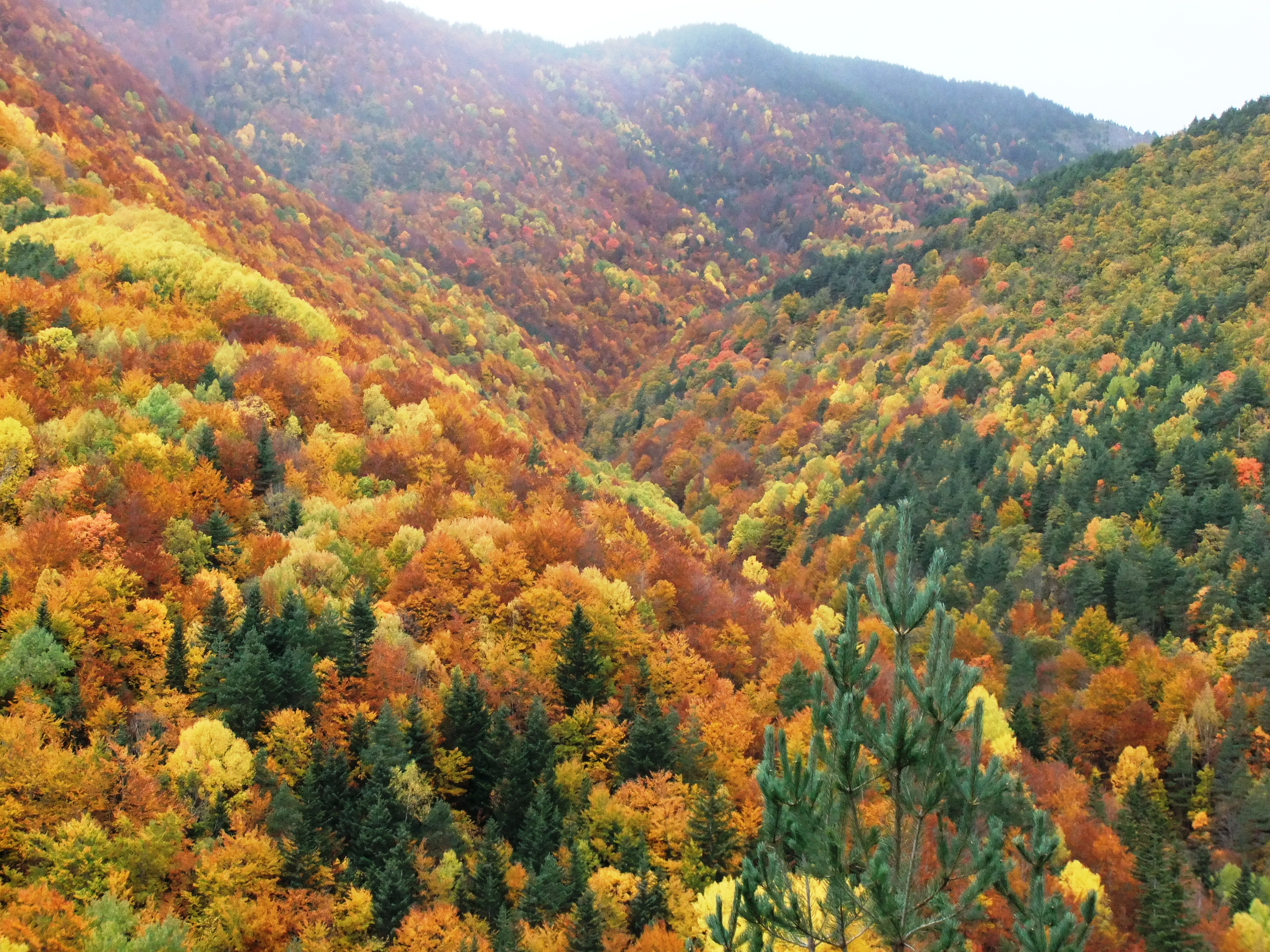
Forest in autumn: bosque de La Pardina del Señor, between Fanlo and Sarvisé.

== See also ==
- List of municipalities in Huesca
