= Solana Valley =

Solana Valley Valle de la Solana
- Natural region
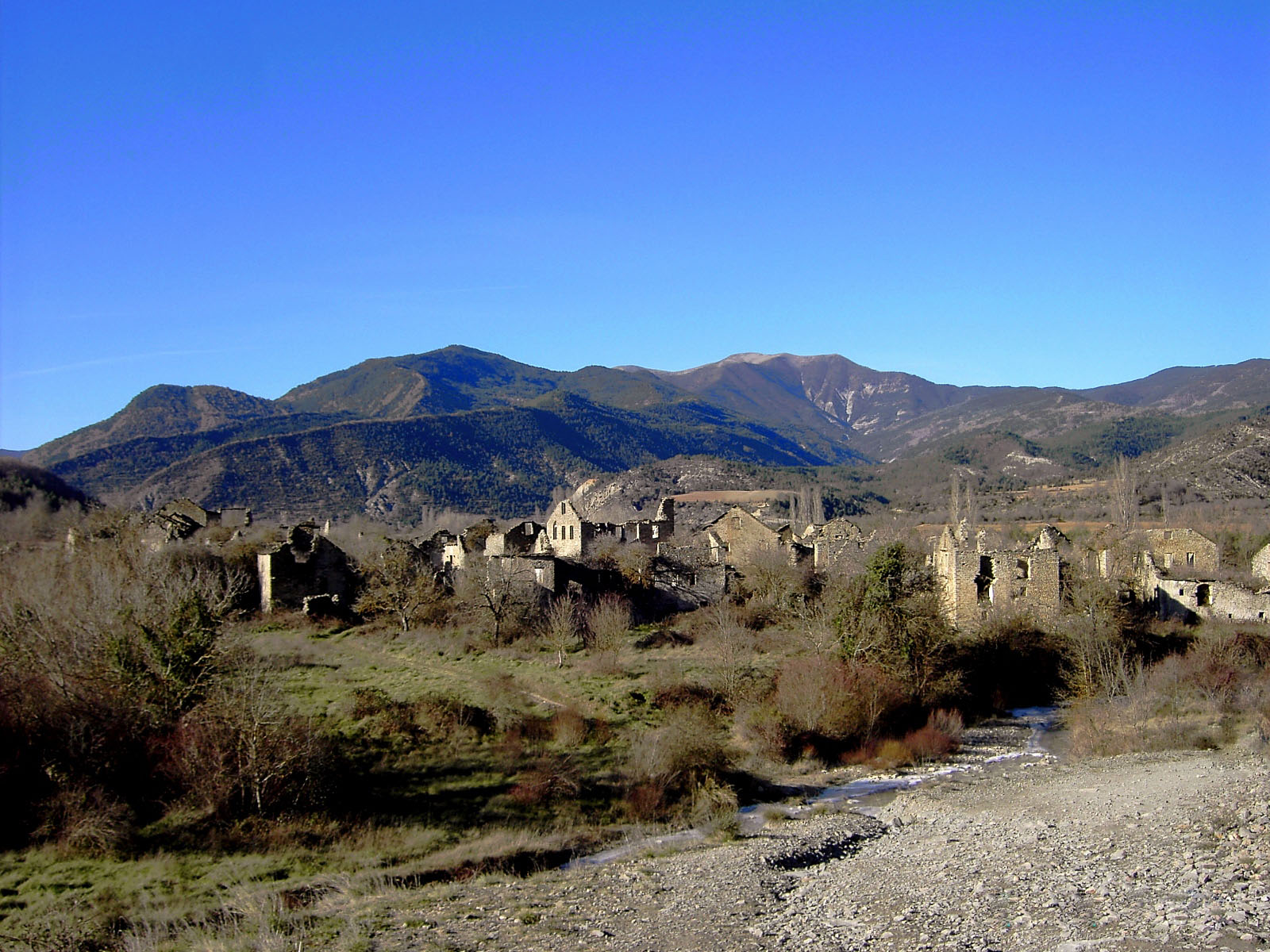
- View of Jánovas, one of the abandoned villages in the Solana Valley.

- Location within Spain
- Coordinates: 42°29′45″N 0°1′30″W
- Country: Spain
- Region: Aragon
- Elevation: 850 m (2,790 ft)

Solana Valley (Spanish language Valle de la Solana; Aragonese language Val d'a Solana) is a valley in the Pyrenees. It is located in Aragon, Spain. River Ara cuts across the valley from east to west and its average altitude is 850 m.

== History ==
There were many villages in Solana Valley. The inhabitants left the place between 1960 and 1970 owing to the pressure induced by ICONA, the Spanish National Institute for Forestal recovery that had bought the land surrounding the villages. There were other factors as well, such as the abandonment of traditional agricultural practices like sheep and goat rearing, as well as the lifestyle changes that swept over rural Spain after General Franco's Stabilization Plan that pulled the local youth towards the cities and the coast.

Most of Solana Valley's territory depends administratively from Fiscal, Sobrarbe comarca, Huesca Province.

== Ghost towns ==
In Solana Valley there are numerous village churches and smaller religious buildings, such as the Iglesia de la Asunción and the exconjuratory in Burgasé, the Iglesia de Santa María in Muro de Solana, Santiago Church in Villamana and Saint Peter's Church in Gere. Many of the churches are in ruins.

The villages in the valley lie abandoned and the houses have fallen into disrepair and ruin:

- Burgasé
- Càjol
- Càmpol
- Castellar
- Gere
- Ginuabel
- Giral
- Jánovas
- Lacort
- Lavelilla
- Muro de Ara or Muro de Solana
- Puyuelo
- Sasé
- Semolué
- San Martín de Puytarans or San Martín de la Solana
- Sanfelices de Solana or Sanfelices de la Ribera
- Villamana

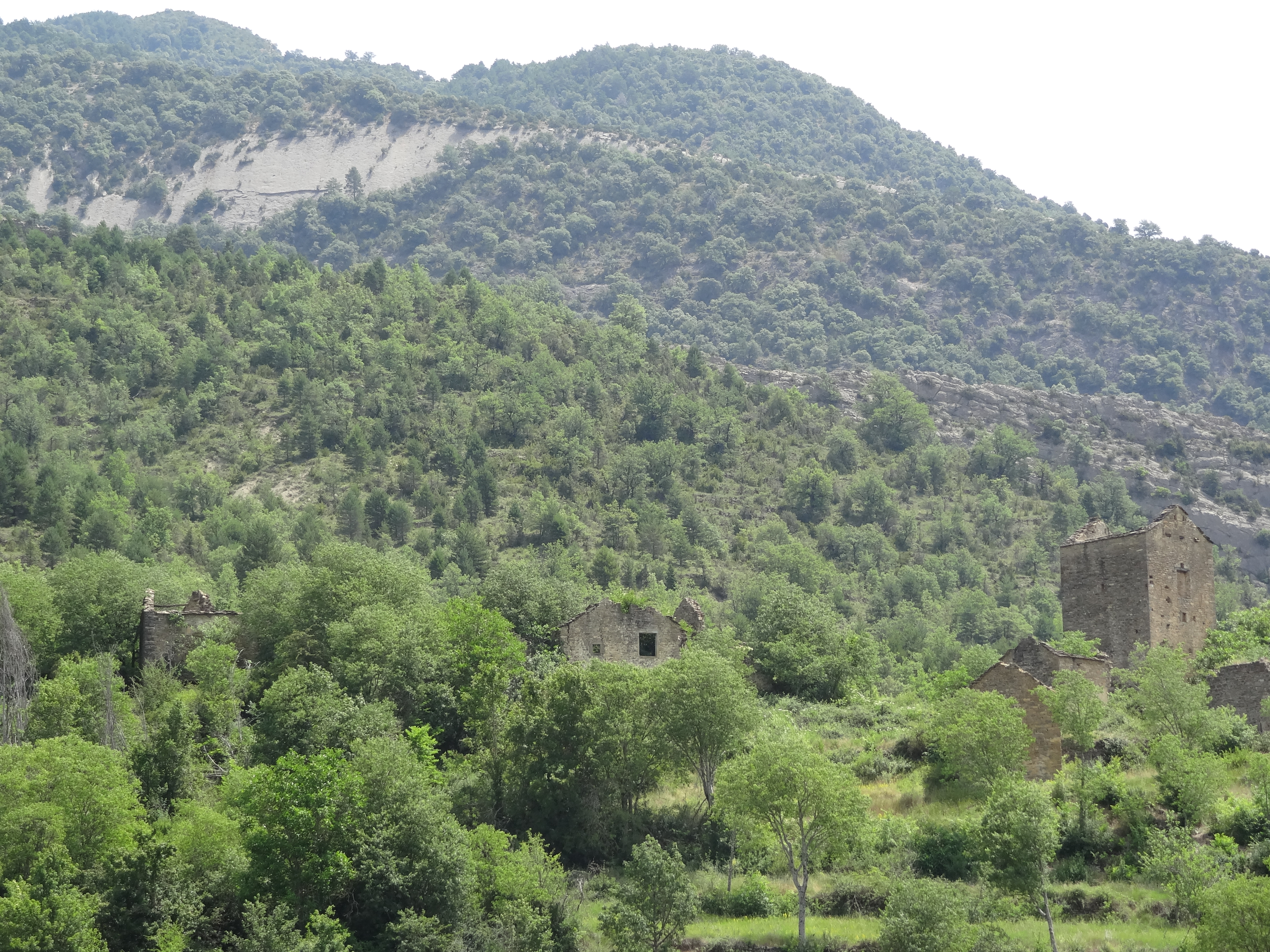
Abandoned houses in Lavelilla.

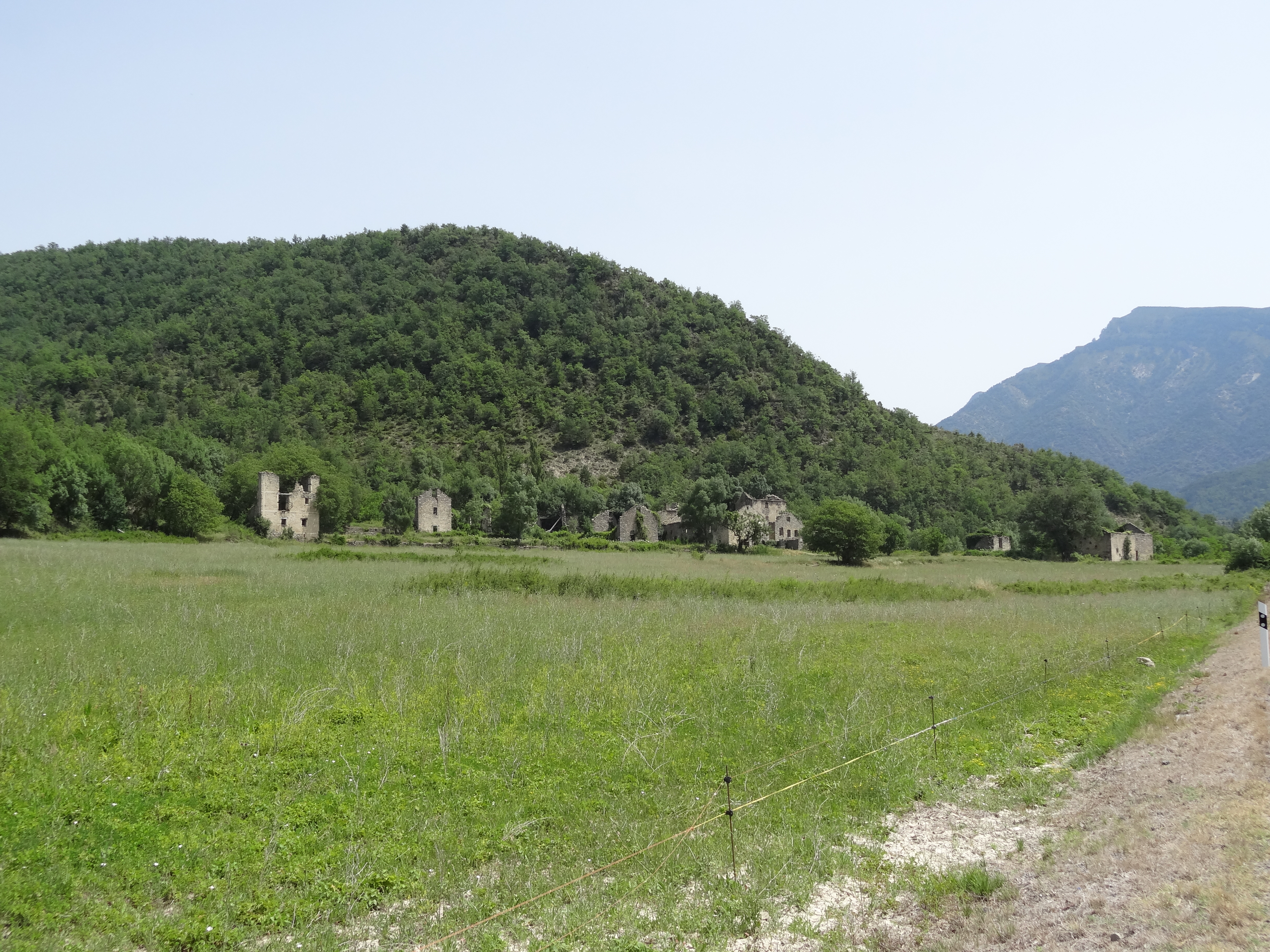
View of Lacort.

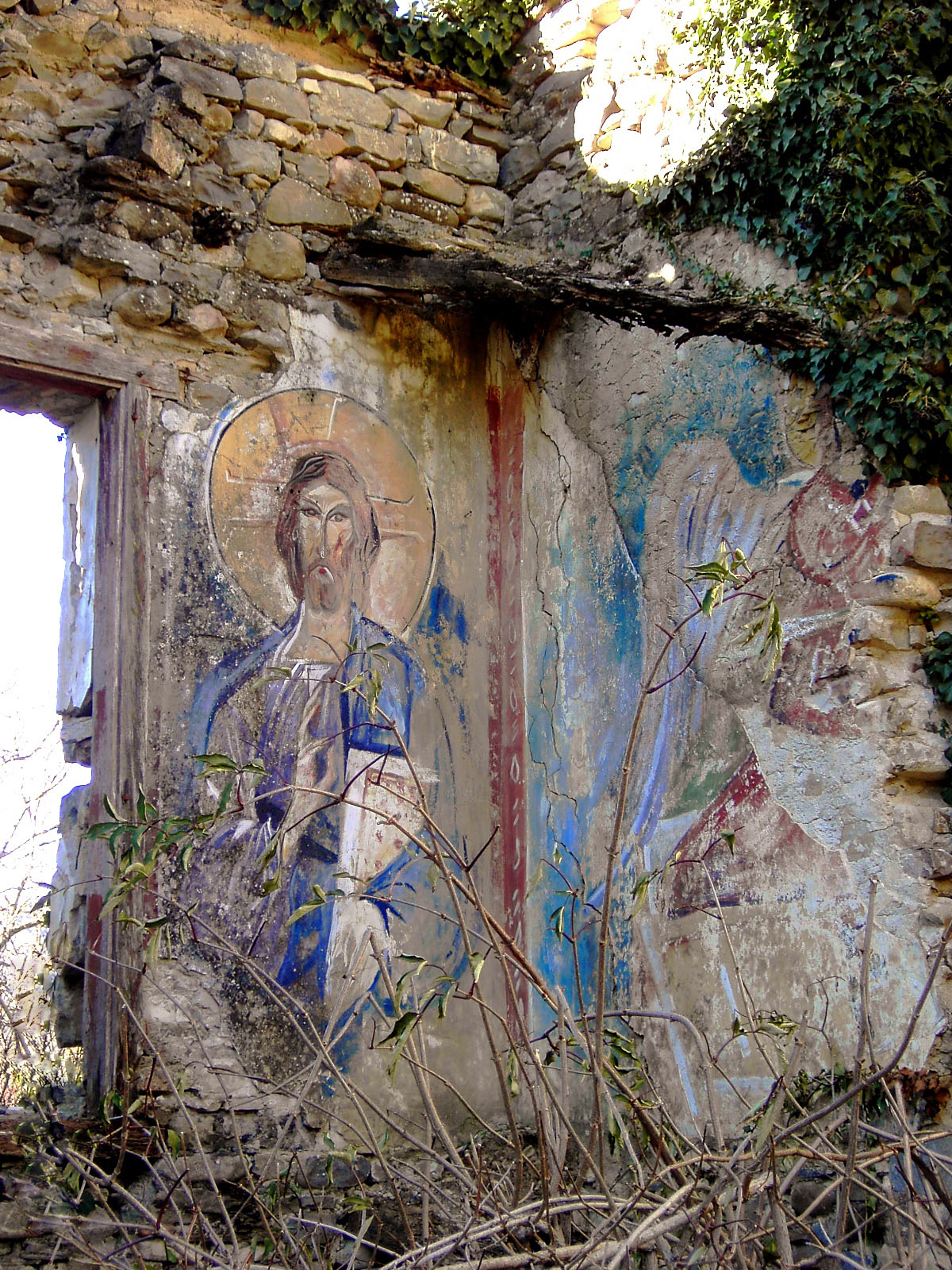
Frescoes decaying in a ruined church of the valley

== See also ==
- Exconjuratory
