= Oto, Spain =

Oto
- village
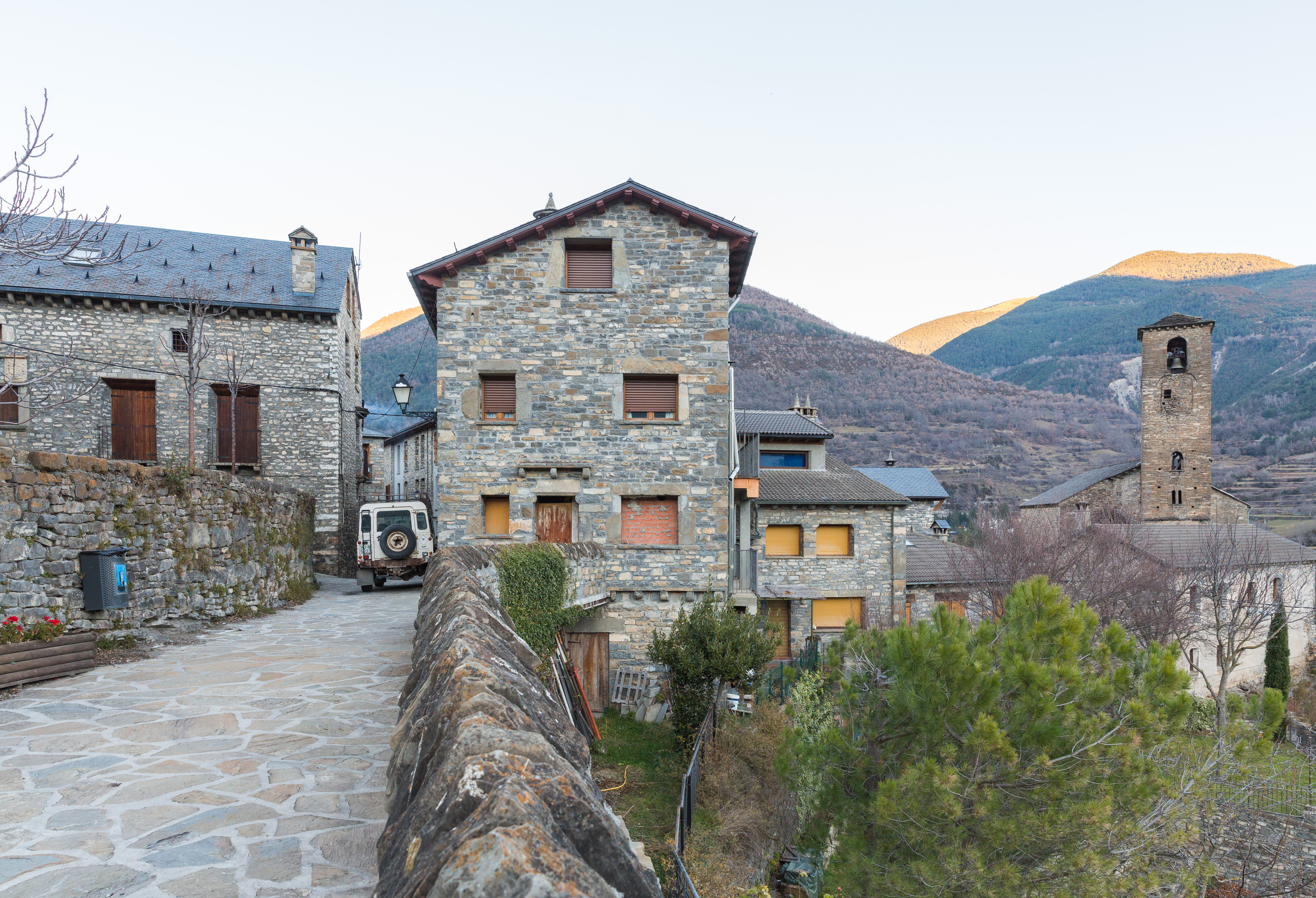

- Location in Aragon Location in Spain
- Coordinates: 42°35′55″N 0°7′41″W
- Country: Spain
- Community: Aragon
- Province: Huesca
- Comarca: Sobrarbe
- Municipality: Broto
- Elevation: 931 m (3,054 ft)

Population (2017)
  - Total: 72
- Time zone: UTC+1 (GMT)
  - Summer (DST): UTC+2 (GMT)

Oto is a village located in the municipality of Broto, Province of Huesca, Aragon, Spain.
