= Sobrarbe =

Coordinates: 42°27′00″N 00°09′00″W

- Comarca
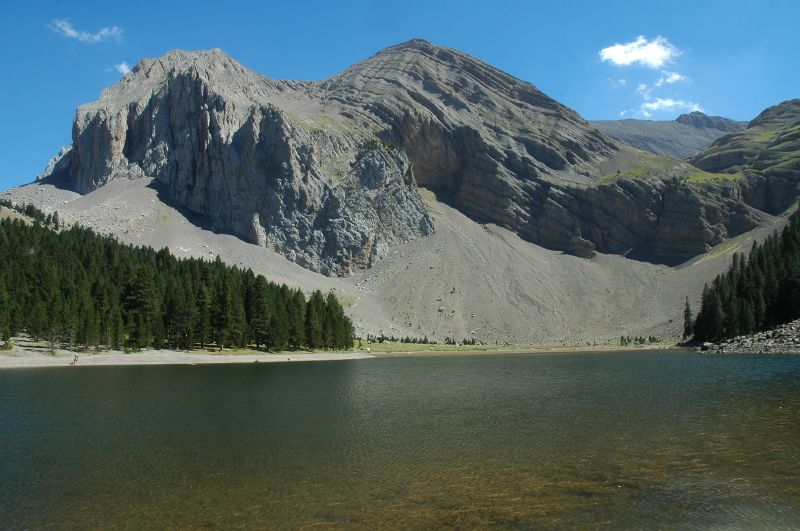
- Bassa de la Mora or Ibon de Plan near Cotiella.

- Coat of arms

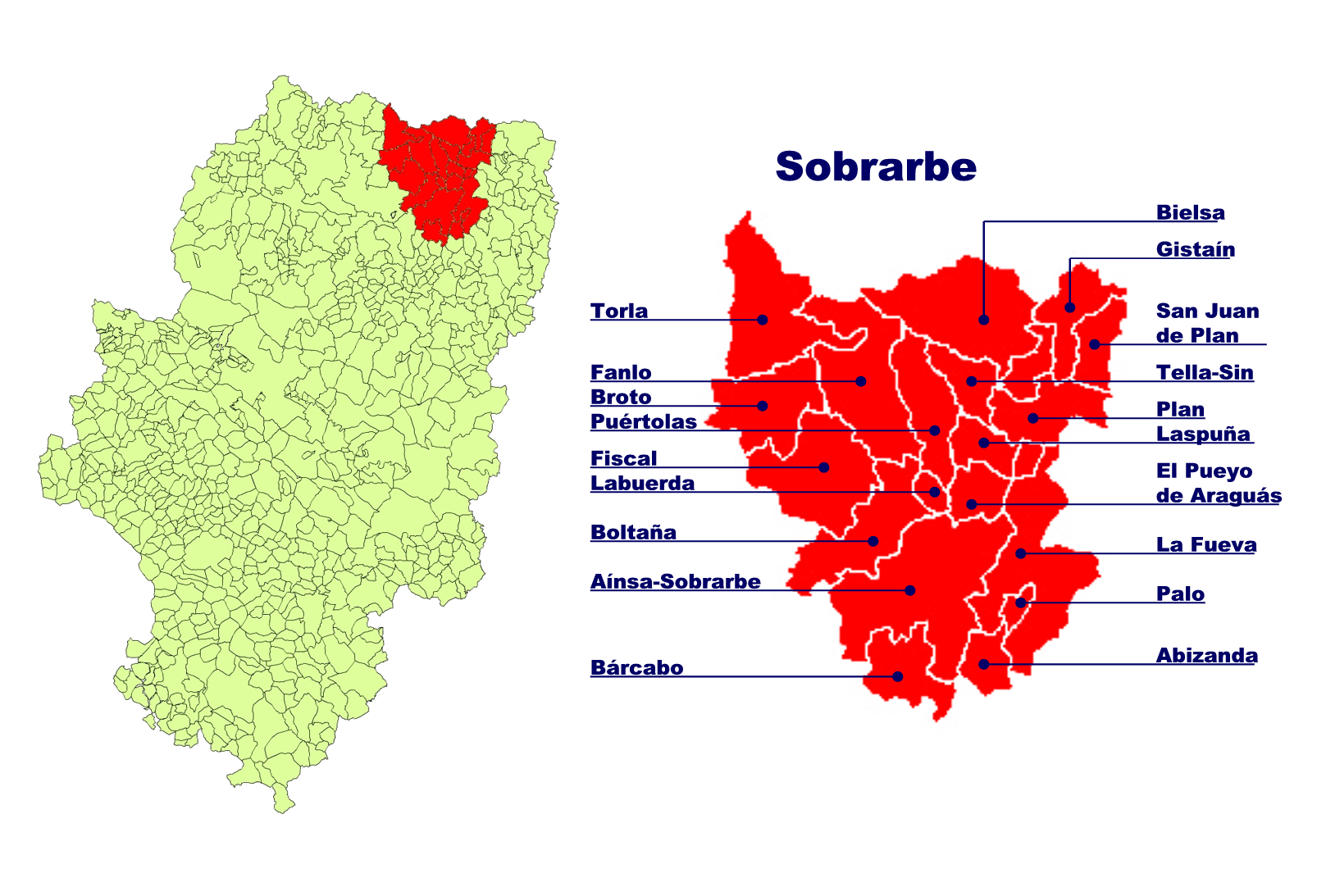
- Country: Spain
- Autonomous community: Aragon
- Province: Huesca
- Capital: Aínsa, Boltaña
- Municipalities: List: See text

Area
  - Total: 2,202.70 km^{2} (850.47 sq mi)

Population
  - Total: 7,293
  - Density: 3.311/km^{2} (8.575/sq mi)
- Time zone: UTC+1 (CET)
  - Summer (DST): UTC+2 (CEST)

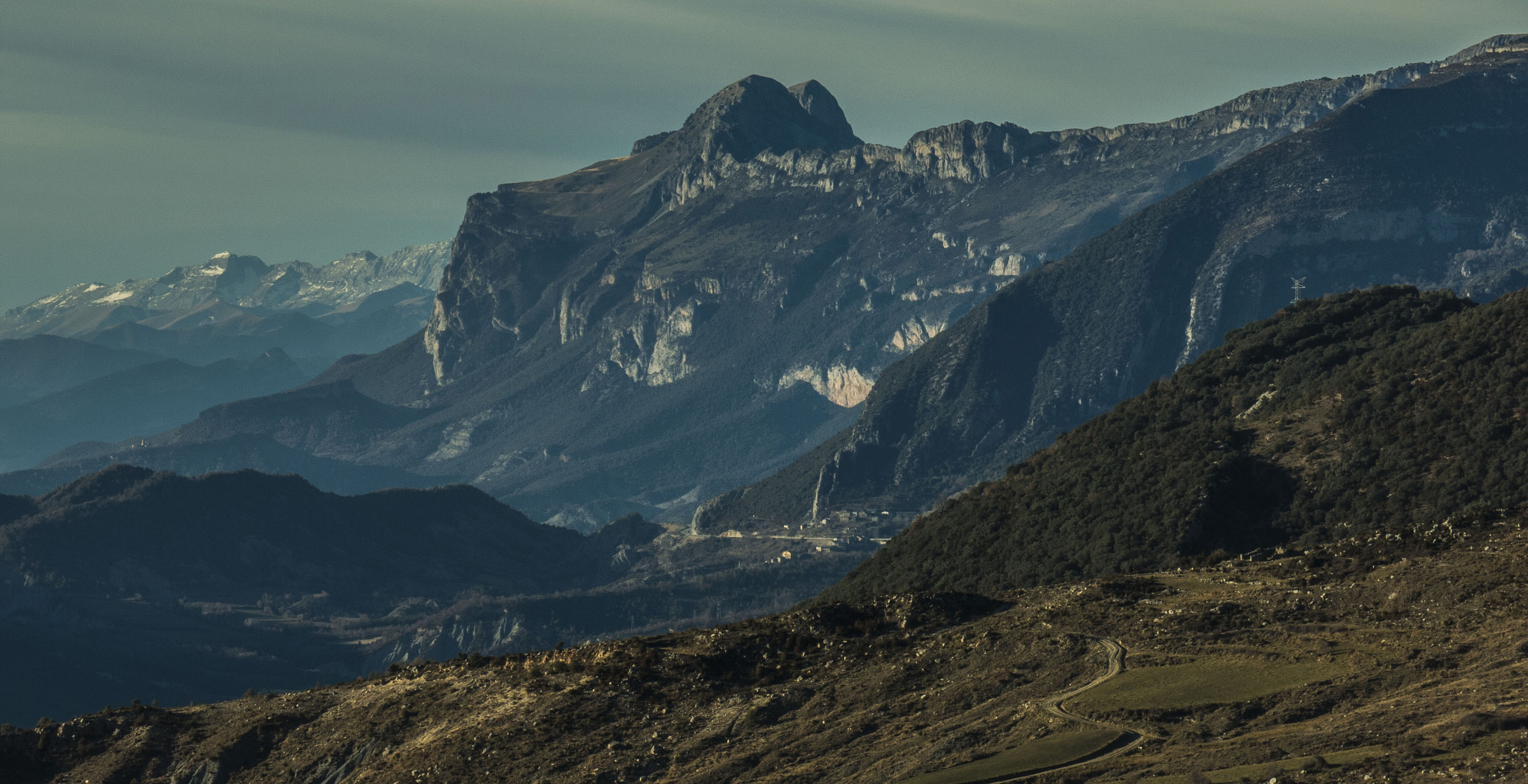
View of Serra Ferrera

Sobrarbe is a comarca of Aragon, Spain. It is located in the north of Huesca province, making up part of the autonomous community of Aragon. Many of its people speak the Aragonese language locally known as fabla.

Sobrarbe is a mountainous region with some of the highest peaks in the Pyrenees, extending from the heights of the Axial Pyrenees in the north on the border with France, to the external Pyrenean mountain ranges in the south which separate it from the Aragonese mountains.

The administrative capital is Boltaña and the economic capital is Aínsa.

== History ==
Sobrarbe was one of the Christian principalities of the Marca Hispanica, with obscure origins. Legend says there was a Kingdom of Sobrarbe, where a cross appeared upon a tree (Latin: Supra Arbore).

It became part of the County of Aragon, but in the early 9th century was held for five years by Amrus ibn Yusuf, the governor of Zaragoza, retaken after his death.

Sobrarbe was joined to the County of Ribagorza in the early 10th century through the marriage of Bernard I of Ribagorza to Toda Galíndez of Aragon, daughter of Galindo Aznárez II. However, in the late 10th and early 11th century, a series of incursions from the south left it disorganized and depopulated, and for a time it fell back under Muslim control. This was reversed by Sancho the Great of Pamplona, who reconquered the region in 1015, later extending his power into Ribagorza. Whatever hereditary claim might have existed was subsequently brought to Sancho through his wife Muniadona of Castile, heiress to the Ribagorza counts.

Sancho divided the territories he had united, and his third son, Gonzalo, was given the counties of Sobrarbe and Ribagorza. After Gonzalo's death in 1038, his illegitimate half-brother Ramiro I of Aragon took Sobrarbe and Ribagorza, creating the nucleus of the Kingdom of Aragon.

== Sobrarbe Geopark ==
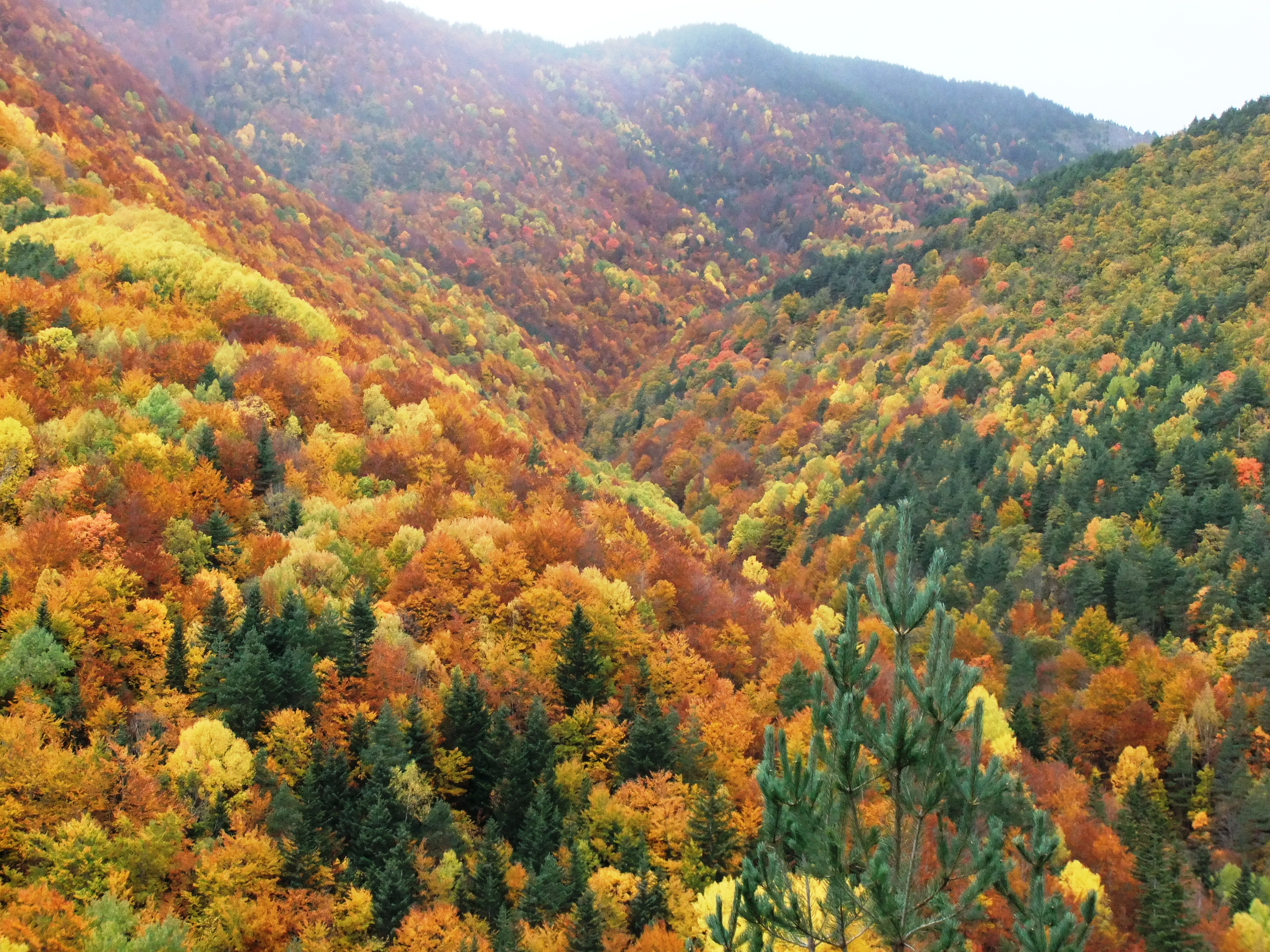
The bosque de La Pardina del Señor, between Fanlo and Sarvisé. One of the most spectacular forests in autumn in Europe

The entire territory of Sobrarbe is "Sobrarbe Geopark" which is a member of the European Geoparks Network (2004–) and Global Geoparks Network (2006–) on account of its outstanding geological heritage, educational programs and projects, and promotion of geotourism.

== Municipalities ==
Abizanda, Aínsa-Sobrarbe, Bárcabo, Bielsa, Boltaña, Broto, Fanlo, Fiscal, La Fueva, Gistaín, Labuerda, Laspuña, Palo, Plan, Puértolas, El Pueyo de Araguás, San Juan de Plan, Tella-Sin, Torla

== See also ==
- Fueros of Sobrarbe
- Solana Valley
- Kingdom of Sobrarbe
