= Labuerda =

Labuerda (Spanish) A Buerda (Aragonese)
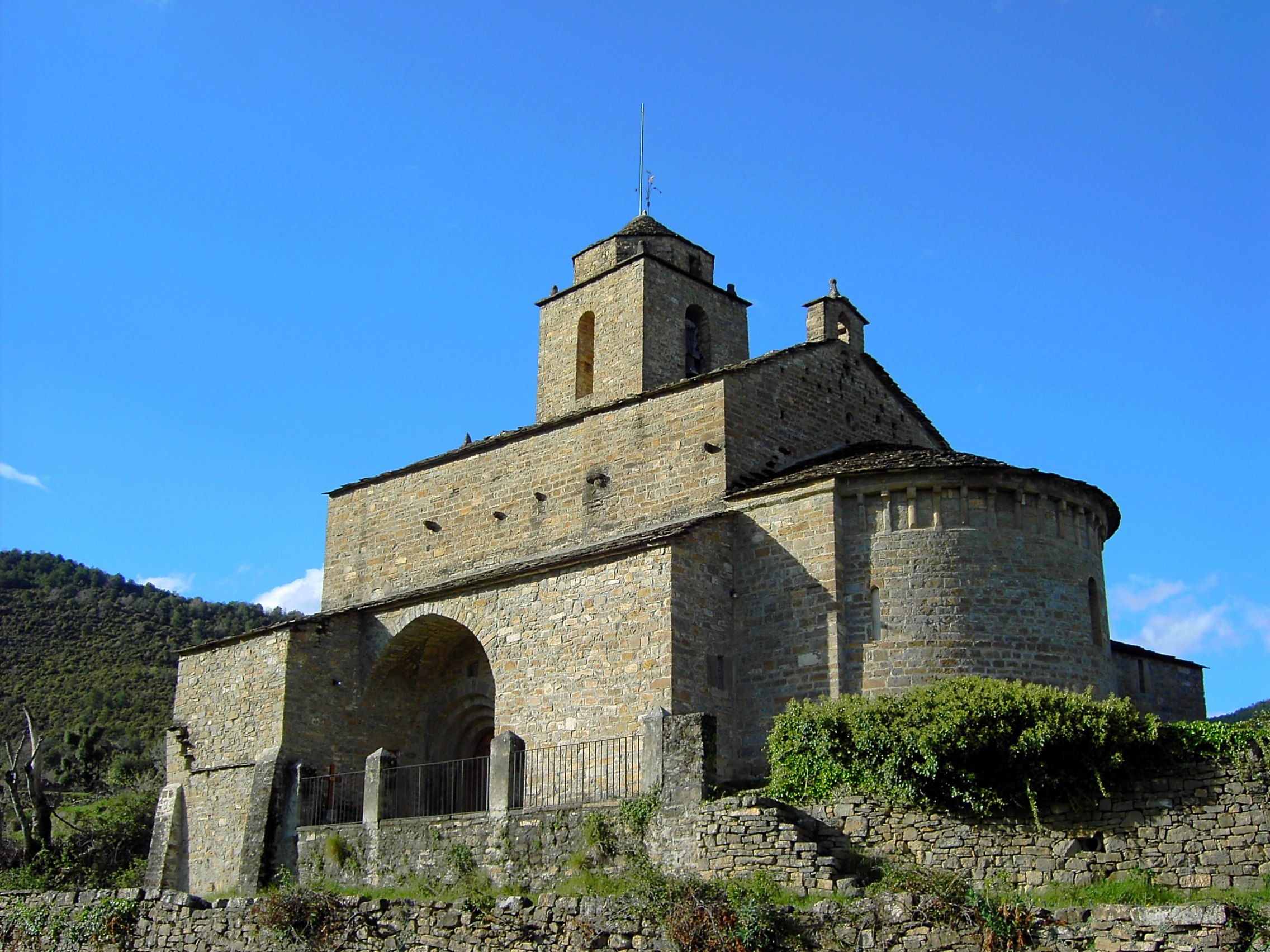
- Church of San Vicente.

- Flag Coat of arms

- Location in Spain
- Coordinates: 42°27′5″N 0°8′18″E
- Country: Spain
- Autonomous community: Aragon
- Province: Huesca
- Comarca: Sobrarbe

Government
  - Mayor: Enrique Campo Sanz

Area
  - Total: 18 km^{2} (6.9 sq mi)
- Elevation: 569 m (1,867 ft)

Population (2025-01-01)
  - Total: 179
  - Density: 9.9/km^{2} (26/sq mi)
- Time zone: UTC+1 (CET)
  - Summer (DST): UTC+2 (CEST)

Labuerda (in Aragonese: A Buerda; and officially "Labuerda-A Buerda") is a municipality located in the province of Huesca, Aragon, Spain. According to the 2009 data from INE, the municipality has a population of 172 inhabitants.

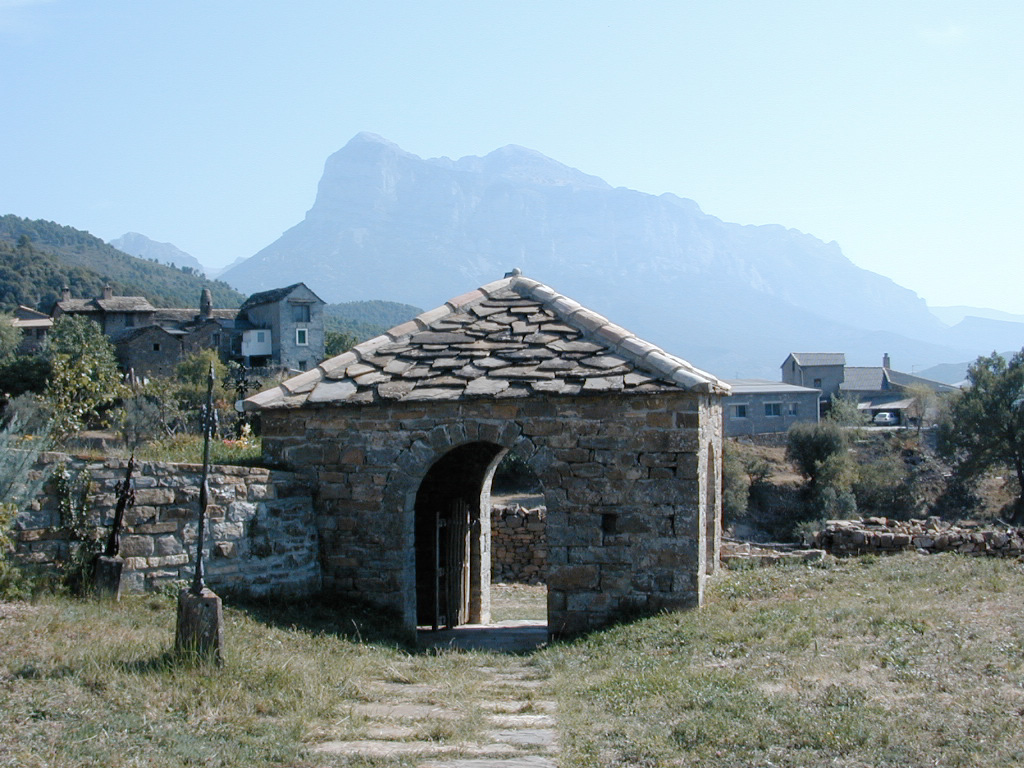
Exconjuratory in San Vicente de Labuerda with the massive Peña Montañesa towering behind it

== Villages ==
- Labuerda, the main town
- San Vicente de Labuerda, which includes the municipality's main attraction, the church of San Vicente. The building has a 12th-century Romanesque nucleus, including the nave, presbytery and the semicircular apse. In the 16th century, the side chapels, the sacristy and the bell tower were added, and in the 18th century another chapel and a portico.

== Twin towns ==
- Cadeilhan-Trachère, France

== See also ==
- List of municipalities in Huesca
