= Puértolas, Aragon =

Puértolas
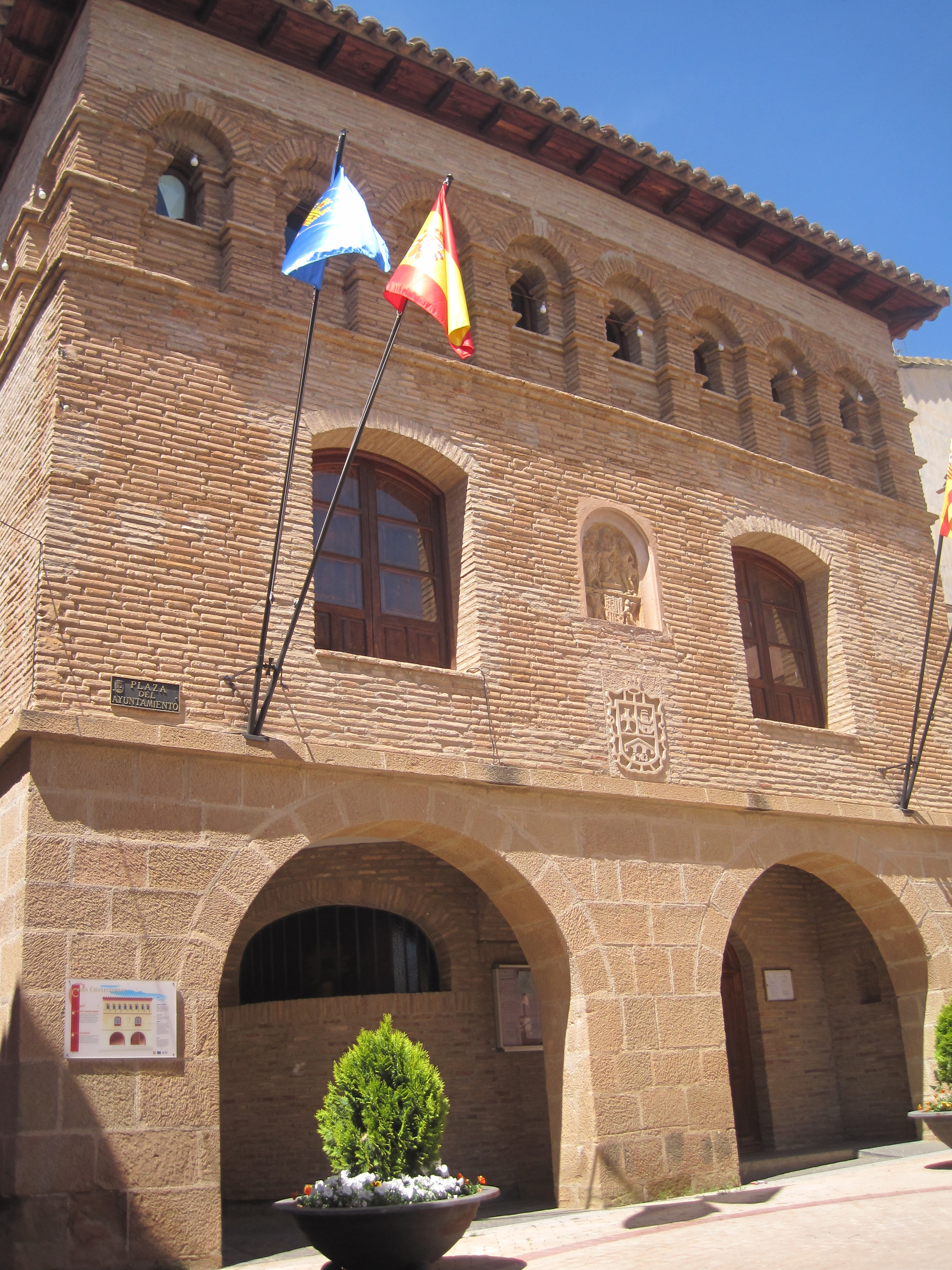
- Town hall

- Location within Spain
- Coordinates: 42°32′52″N 0°07′56″E
- Country: Spain
- Autonomous community: Aragon
- Province: Huesca
- Comarca: Sobrarbe

Area
  - Total: 99.72 km^{2} (38.50 sq mi)

Population (2025-01-01)
  - Total: 217
  - Density: 2.18/km^{2} (5.64/sq mi)
- Time zone: UTC+01:00 (CET)
  - Summer (DST): UTC+02:00 (CEST)

Puértolas is a municipality located in the province of Huesca, Aragon, Spain. As of 2009, the municipality has a population of 239 inhabitants.
