= Bergua =

- Locality
- Location within Aragon Location within Spain
- Coordinates: 42°32′4″N 0°10′9″W
- Country: Spain
- Autonomous community: Aragon
- Province: Province of Huesca
- Municipality: Broto
- Elevation: 1,036 m (3,399 ft)

Population
  - Total: 25

Bergua is a locality located in the municipality of Broto, in Huesca province, Aragon, Spain. As of 2020, it has a population of 25.

== Geography ==
Bergua is located 77km north-northeast of Huesca.
