= Buesa (Broto) =

- Locality
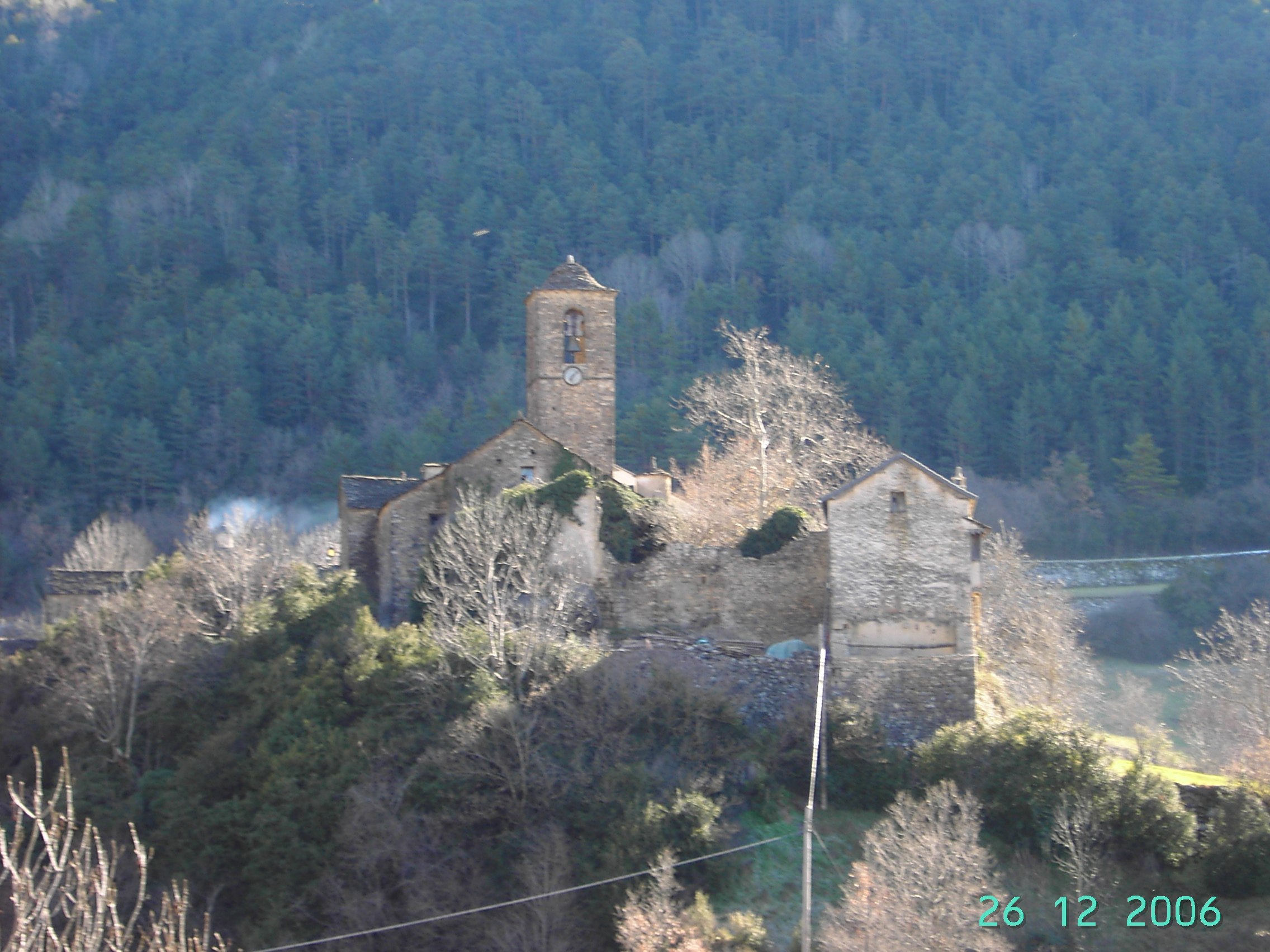

- Location within Aragon Location within Spain
- Coordinates: 42°35′1″N 0°6′21″W
- Country: Spain
- Autonomous community: Aragon
- Province: Province of Huesca
- Municipality: Broto
- Elevation: 1,131 m (3,711 ft)

Population
  - Total: 46

Buesa is a locality located in the municipality of Broto, in Huesca province, Aragon, Spain. As of 2020, it has a population of 46.

== Geography ==
Buesa is located 85km north-northeast of Huesca.
