= Asín de Broto =

- Locality
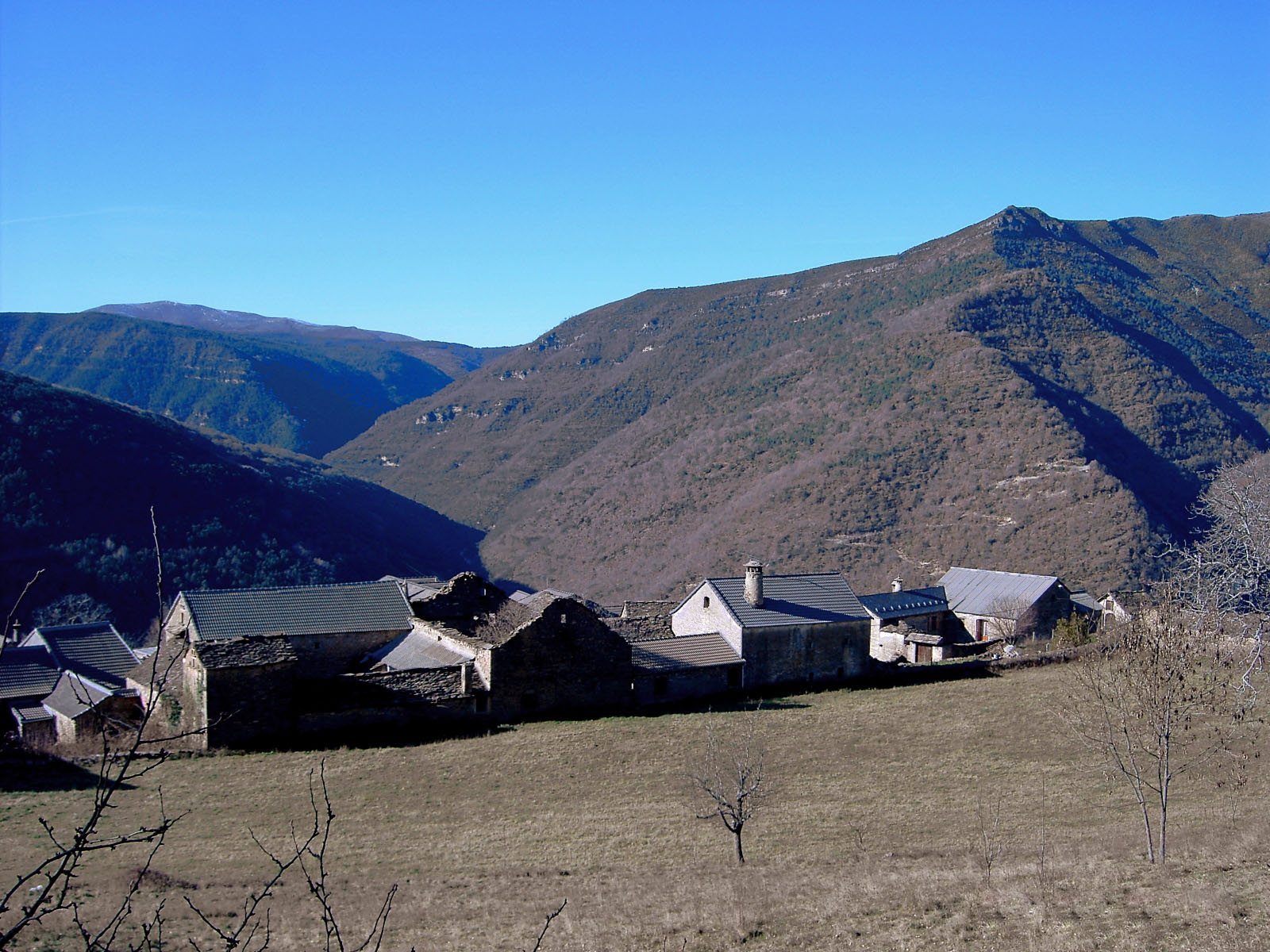

- Location within Aragon Location within Spain
- Coordinates: 42°31′55″N 0°7′42″W
- Country: Spain
- Autonomous community: Aragon
- Province: Province of Huesca
- Municipality: Broto
- Elevation: 1,113 m (3,652 ft)

Population
  - Total: 28

Asín de Broto is a locality located in the municipality of Broto, in Huesca province, Aragon, Spain. As of 2020, it has a population of 28.

== Geography ==
Asín de Broto is located 78km north-northeast of Huesca.
