= Boltaña =

Boltaña Boltanya
- Municipality
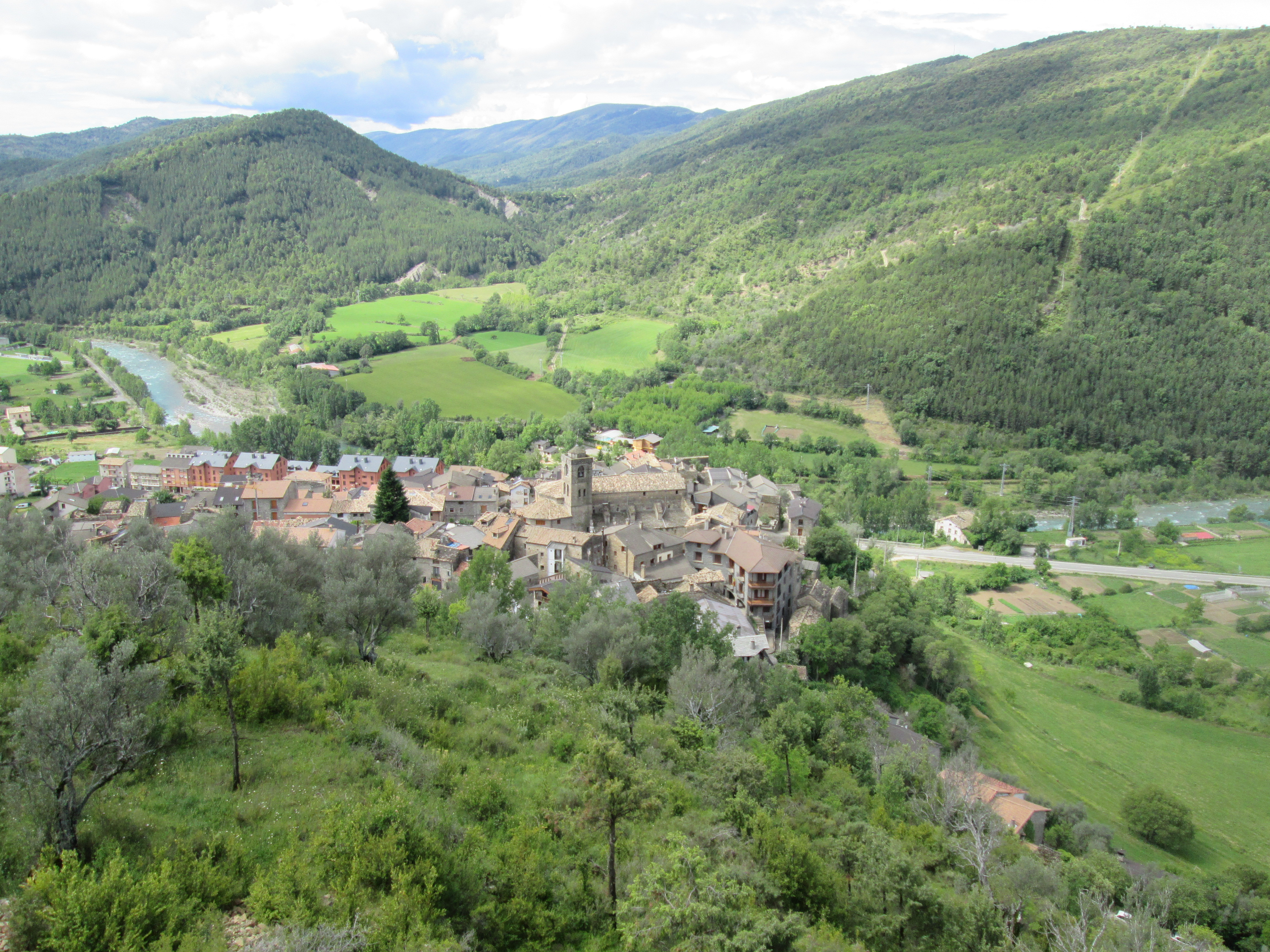
- Boltaña as seen from the path to the castle.

- Flag Coat of arms

- Location of Boltaña within Aragon Location of Boltaña within Spain
- Coordinates: 42°27′N 0°04′E
- Country: Spain
- Autonomous community: Aragon
- Province: Huesca
- Comarca: Sobrarbe

Area
  - Total: 139 km^{2} (54 sq mi)

Population (2025-01-01)
  - Total: 1,089
  - Density: 7.83/km^{2} (20.3/sq mi)
- Time zone: UTC+1 (CET)
  - Summer (DST): UTC+2 (CEST)

Boltaña (in Aragonese: Boltanya) is a municipality located in the province of Huesca, Aragon, Spain. According to the 2004 census (INE), the municipality has a population of 870 inhabitants.

Boltaña is the economic development capital of the Sobrarbe comarca.

== See also ==
- List of municipalities in Huesca
