= Lardiés =

- Locality
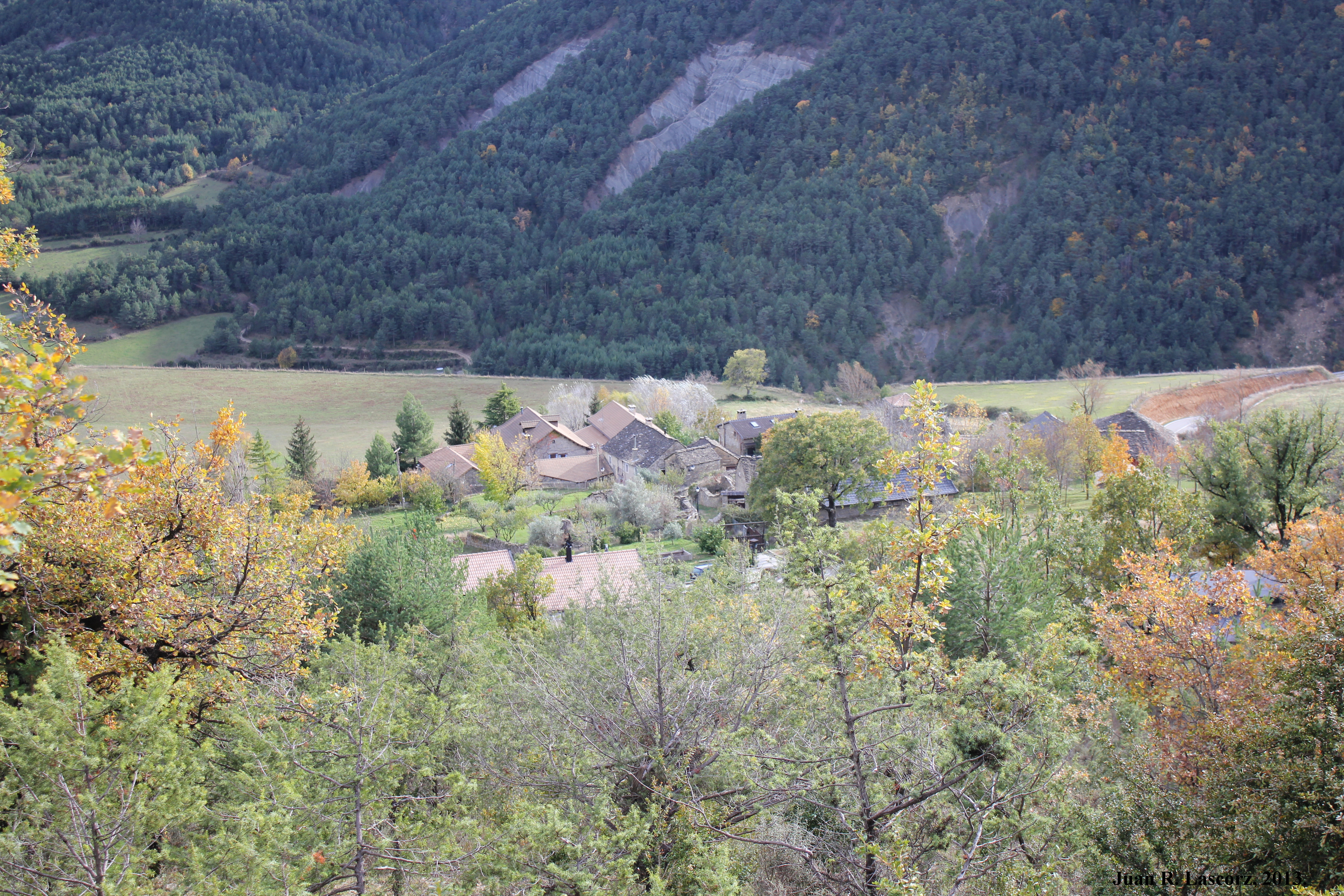

- Location within Aragon Location within Spain
- Coordinates: 42°29′55″N 0°7′58″W
- Country: Spain
- Autonomous community: Aragon
- Province: Province of Huesca
- Municipality: Fiscal, Aragon
- Elevation: 907 m (2,976 ft)

Population
  - Total: 10

Lardiés is a hamlet located in the municipality of Fiscal, Aragon, in Huesca province, Aragon, Spain. As of 2020, it has a population of 10.

== Geography ==
Lardiés is located 69km north-northeast of Huesca.
