= Broto =

Coordinates: 42°36′N 0°07′W

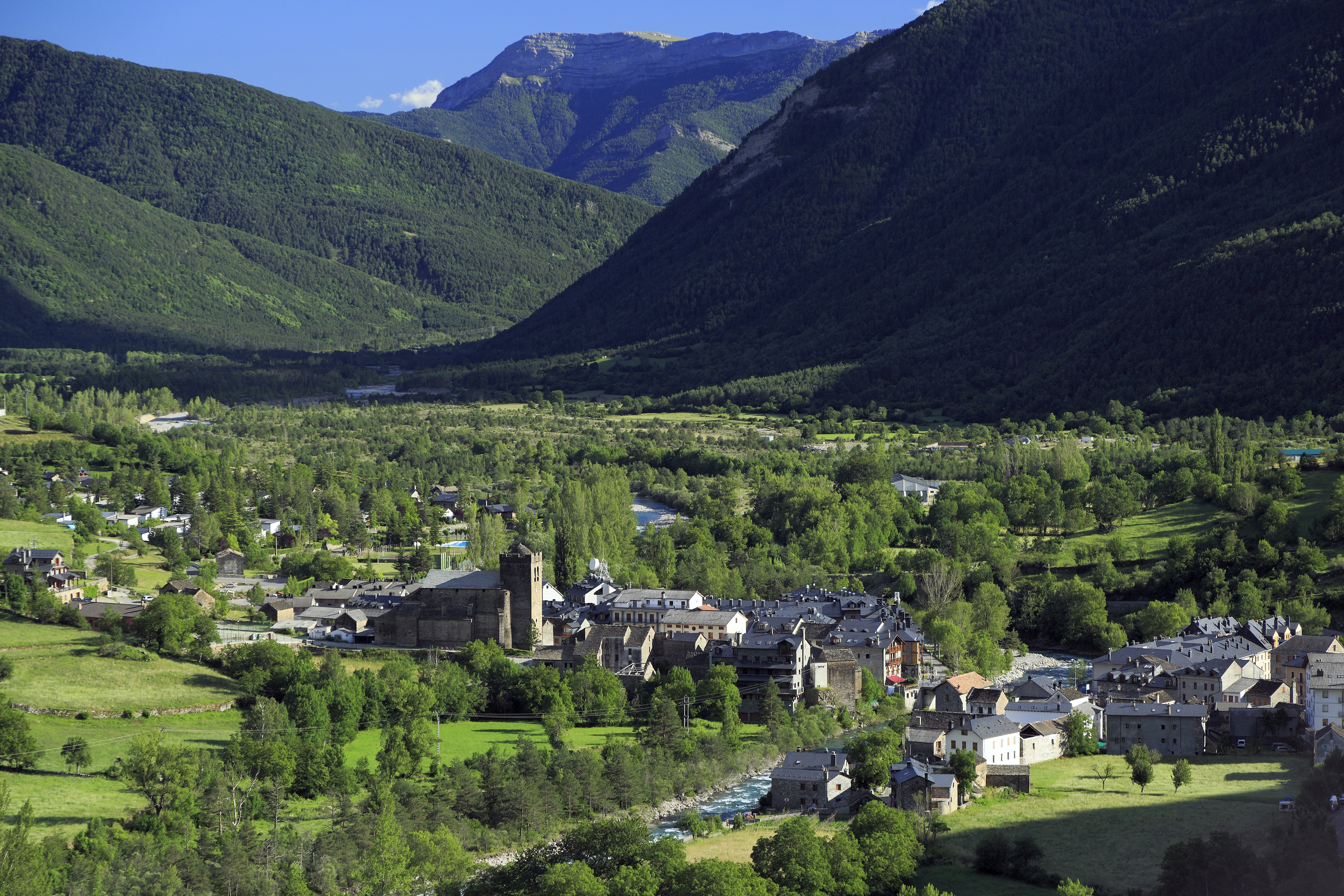
- Interactive map of Broto
- Country: Spain
- Autonomous community: Aragon
- Province: Huesca
- Municipality: Broto

Area
  - Total: 128 km^{2} (49 sq mi)

Population (2025-01-01)
  - Total: 615
  - Density: 4.80/km^{2} (12.4/sq mi)
- Time zone: UTC+1 (CET)
  - Summer (DST): UTC+2 (CEST)

Broto (in Medieval Aragonese: Brotto) is a municipality in the province of Huesca, Aragon, Spain. According to the 2018 census (INE), the municipality has a population of 531 inhabitants.

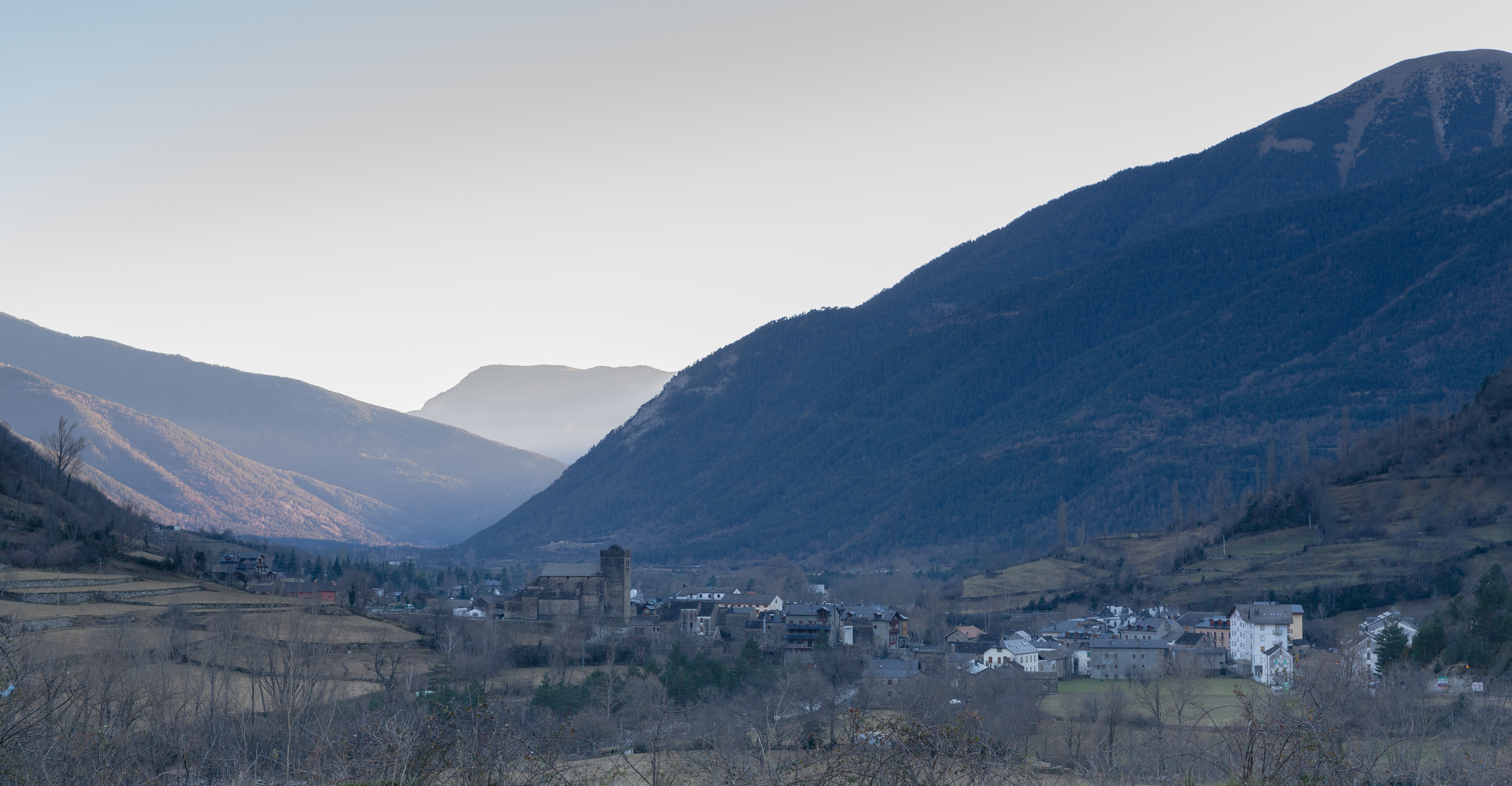
View of Broto

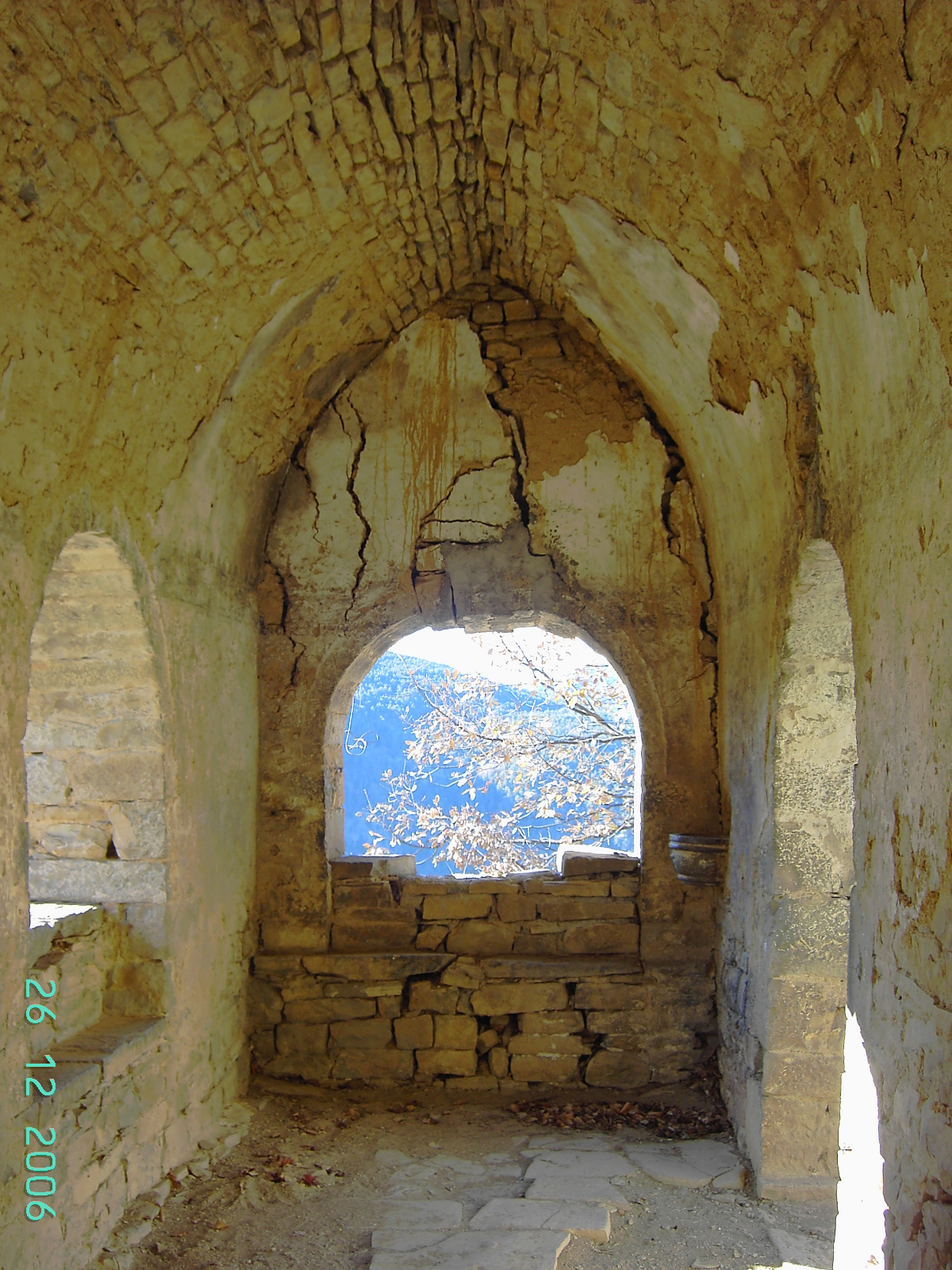
Interior of the exconjuratory in Asin de Broto

== Villages ==
The Valle de Broto includes the following villages:

- Broto proper (905 m) in the center of the valley
- Oto (913 m), 1 km south of Broto
- Buesa (1135 m), 3 km south of Broto on the eastern slope of the valley
- Sarvisé (863 m), 3 km south of Broto
- Asín de Broto (1103 m), 13 km south of Broto, 4 km north of Fiscal
- Bergua (1030 m), 3 km west of Asin, now deserted
- Ayerbe de Broto, now deserted
- Yosa, now deserted
- Escartin, now deserted
- Torla (1032 m)
- Fragen (1113 m)
- Viu de Linás (1243 m)
- Linás de Broto (1456 m)

== See also ==
- List of municipalities in Huesca
