= Ligüerre de Ara =

- Locality
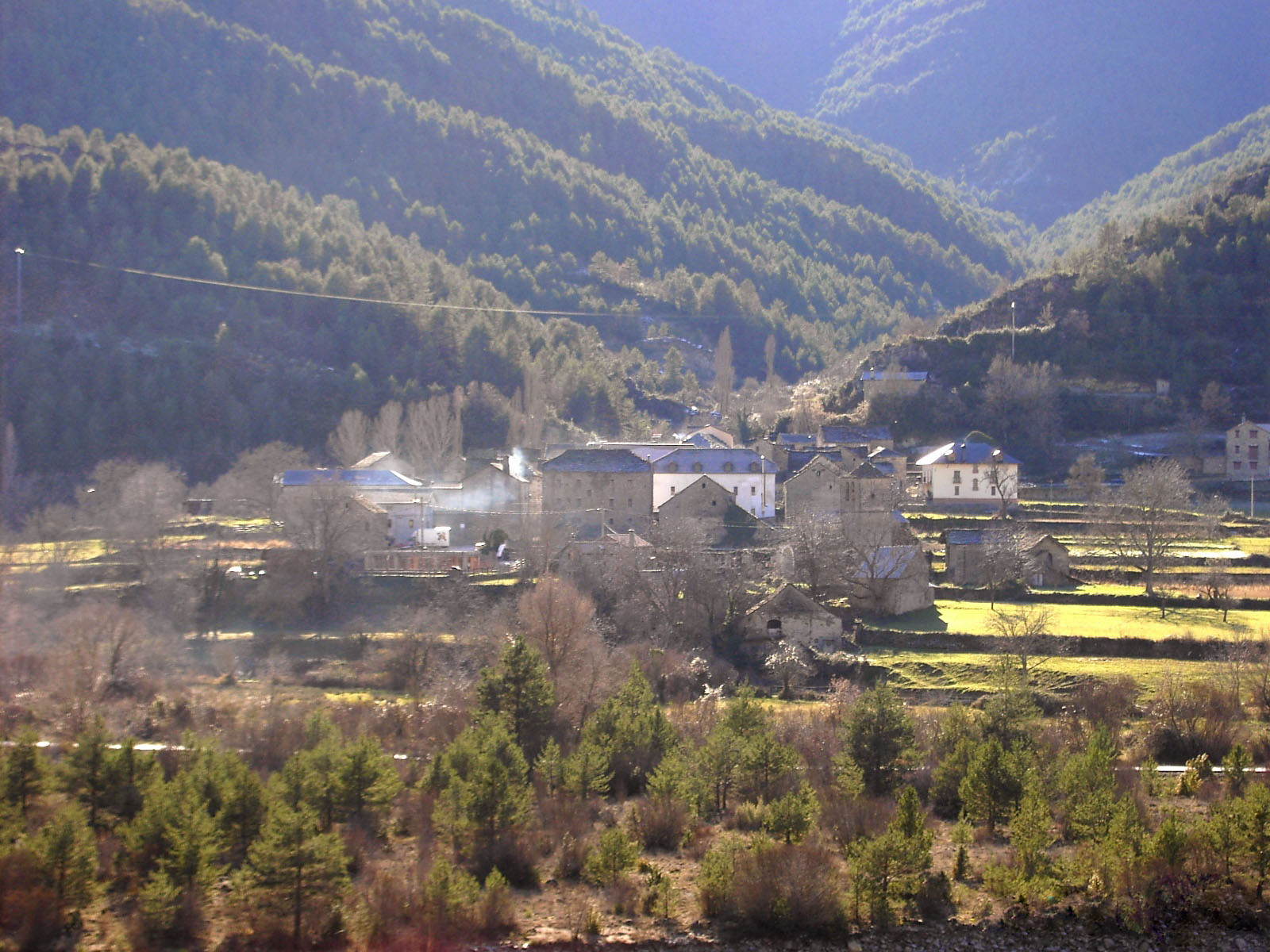

- Location within Aragon Location within Spain
- Coordinates: 42°28′33″N 0°4′40″W
- Country: Spain
- Autonomous community: Aragon
- Province: Province of Huesca
- Municipality: Fiscal, Aragon
- Elevation: 719 m (2,359 ft)

Population
  - Total: 36

Ligüerre de Ara is a locality located in the municipality of Fiscal, Aragon, in Huesca province, Aragon, Spain. As of 2020, it has a population of 36.

== Geography ==
Ligüerre de Ara is located 76km northeast of Huesca.
