= Palo, Aragon =

Palo
- Municipality
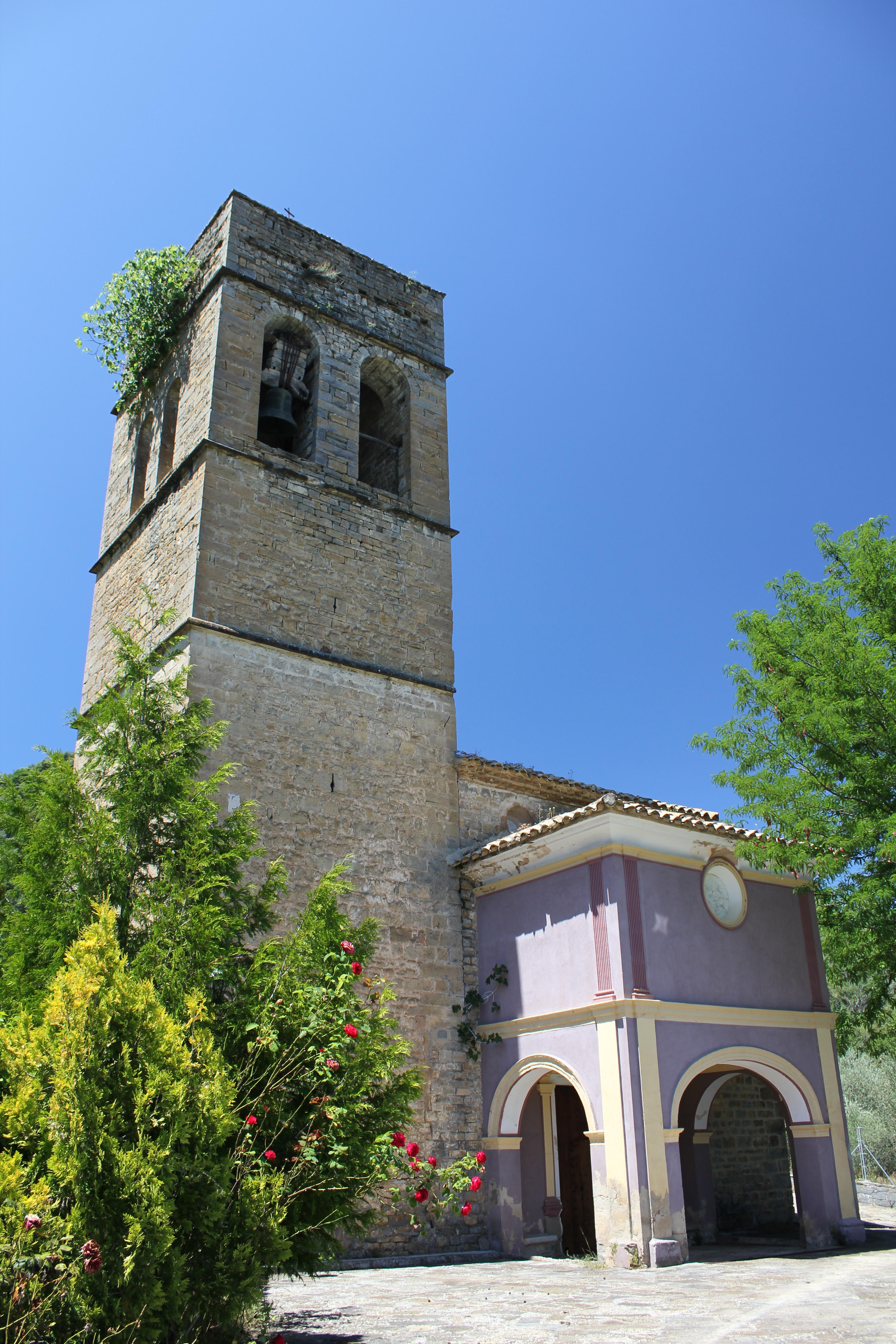
- Church in Palo.

- Location of Palo. Palo (Aragon)
- Coordinates: 42°19′N 0°15′E
- Country: Spain
- Community: Aragon
- Province: Huesca
- Comarca: Sobrarbe

Government
  - Mayor: Begoña Dorado Núñez (PSOE)

Area
  - Total: 14.40 km^{2} (5.56 sq mi)

Population (2023)
  - Total: 32
  - Density: 2.2/km^{2} (5.8/sq mi)
- Time zone: UTC+1 (CET)
  - Summer (DST): UTC+2 (CEST)
- Postal code: 22337
- Website: www.palo.es

Palo is a municipality in the province of Huesca, Spain. As of 2023, it has a population of 32 inhabitants.

== Main sights ==
- Church of San Martín
- Church of Santa Calmosa
- Hermitage of San Clemente

== See also ==
- List of municipalities in Huesca
