= Abizanda =

Abizanda L'Abizanda (Aragonese)
- Municipality
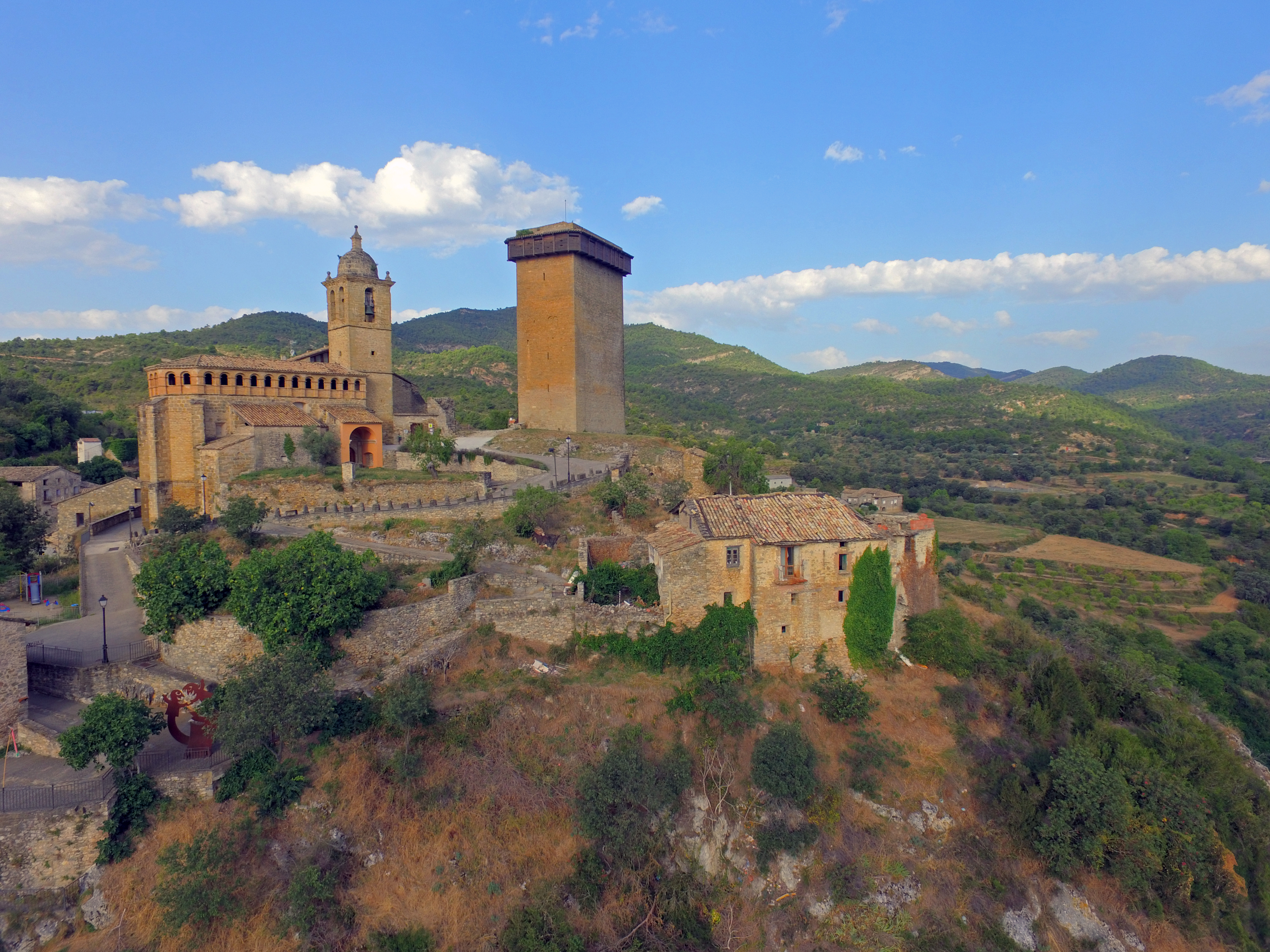

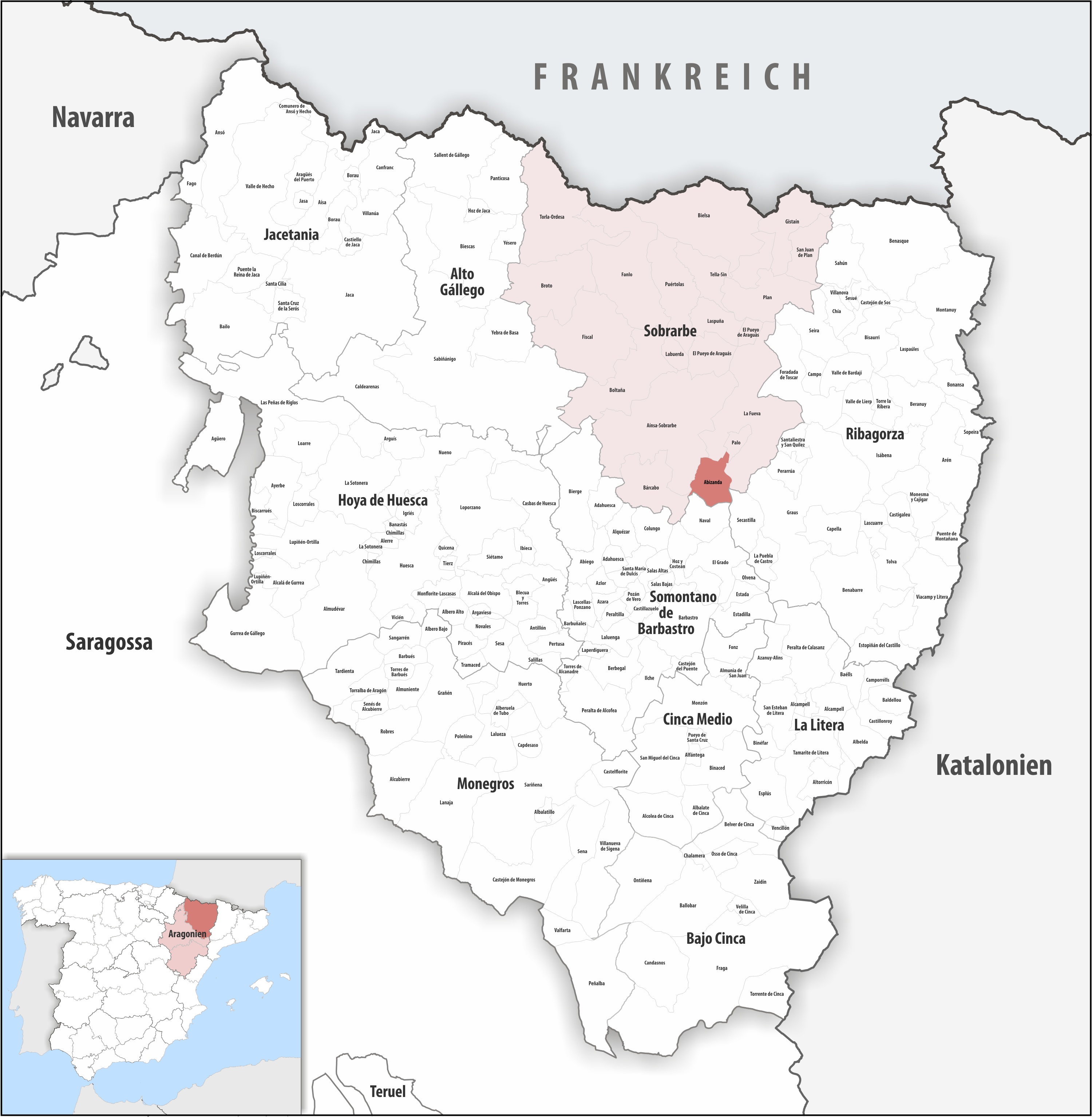
- Municipal location within the Comarca of Sobrarbe and Province of Huesca.

- Location within Spain
- Coordinates: 42°15′N 0°12′E
- Country: Spain
- Autonomous community: Aragon
- Province: Huesca
- Comarca: Sobrarbe

Area
  - Total: 44 km^{2} (17 sq mi)

Population (2025-01-01)
  - Total: 162
  - Density: 3.7/km^{2} (9.5/sq mi)
- Time zone: UTC+1 (CET)
  - Summer (DST): UTC+2 (CEST)

Abizanda (in Aragonese: L'Abizanda) is a municipality located in the province of Huesca, Aragon, Spain. According to the 2018 census (INE), the municipality has a population of 151 inhabitants.

== See also ==
- List of municipalities in Huesca
