= Fiscal, Aragon =

Municipality in Spain

Coordinates: 42°30′N 0°07′W

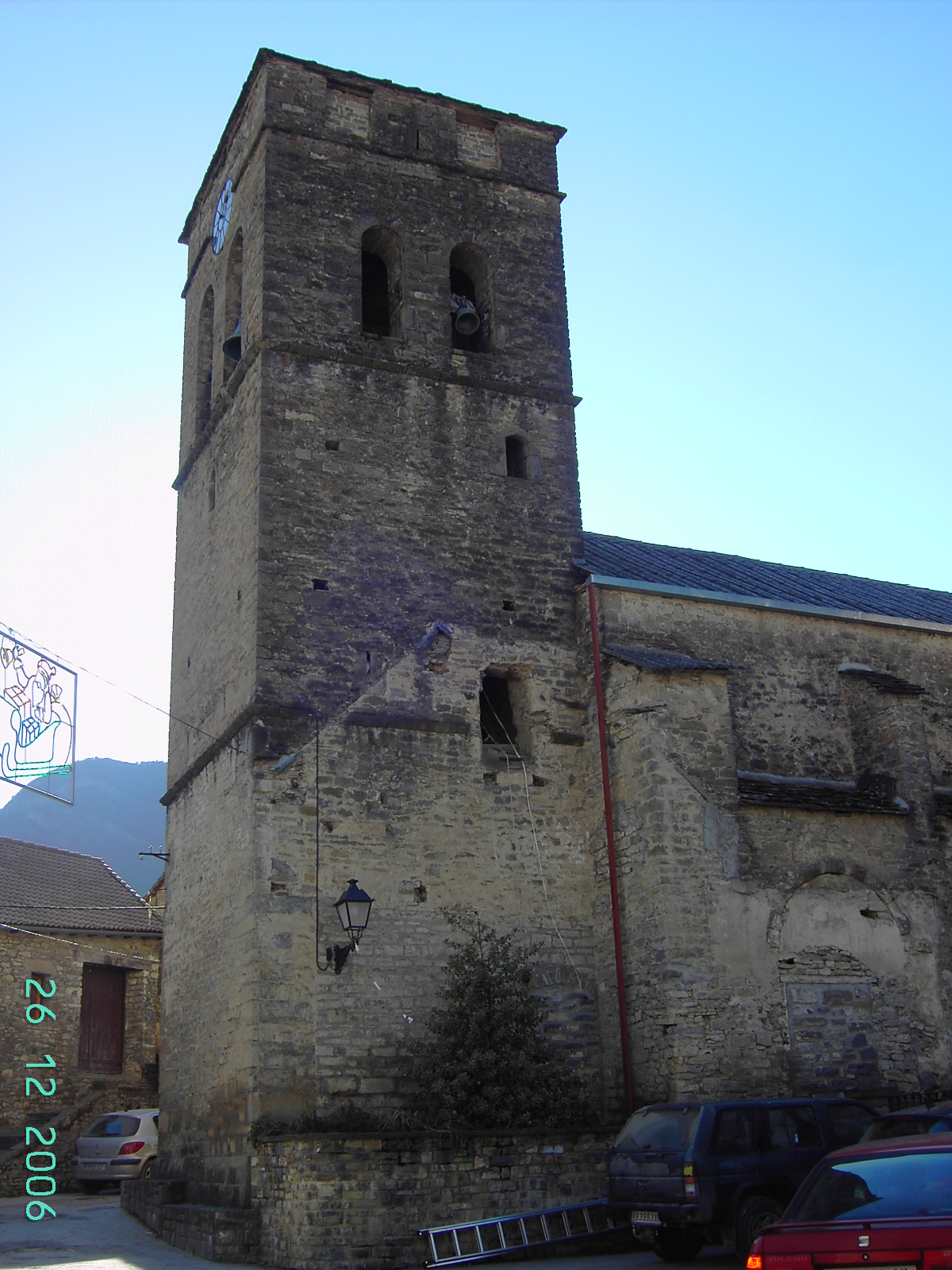
Church in Fiscal

Fiscal is a municipality in the province of Huesca, Sobrarbe comarca, Aragon, Spain. It is located 76 kilometers from Huesca. It is 768 meters above sea level, and covers an area of 170 km^{2}. As of 2018, it had a population of 327 inhabitants. Fiscal has a population of 358 inhabitants (INE 2025).

== Geography ==
Villages: Albella, Arresa, Borrastre, Jánovas, Javierre de Ara, Lacort, Lardiés, Ligüerre de Ara, Planillo, San Felices de Ara, San Juste, San Martín de Solana and Santa Olaria de Ara.

== See also ==
- Solana Valley
- List of municipalities in Huesca
