= Jánovas =

- Locality
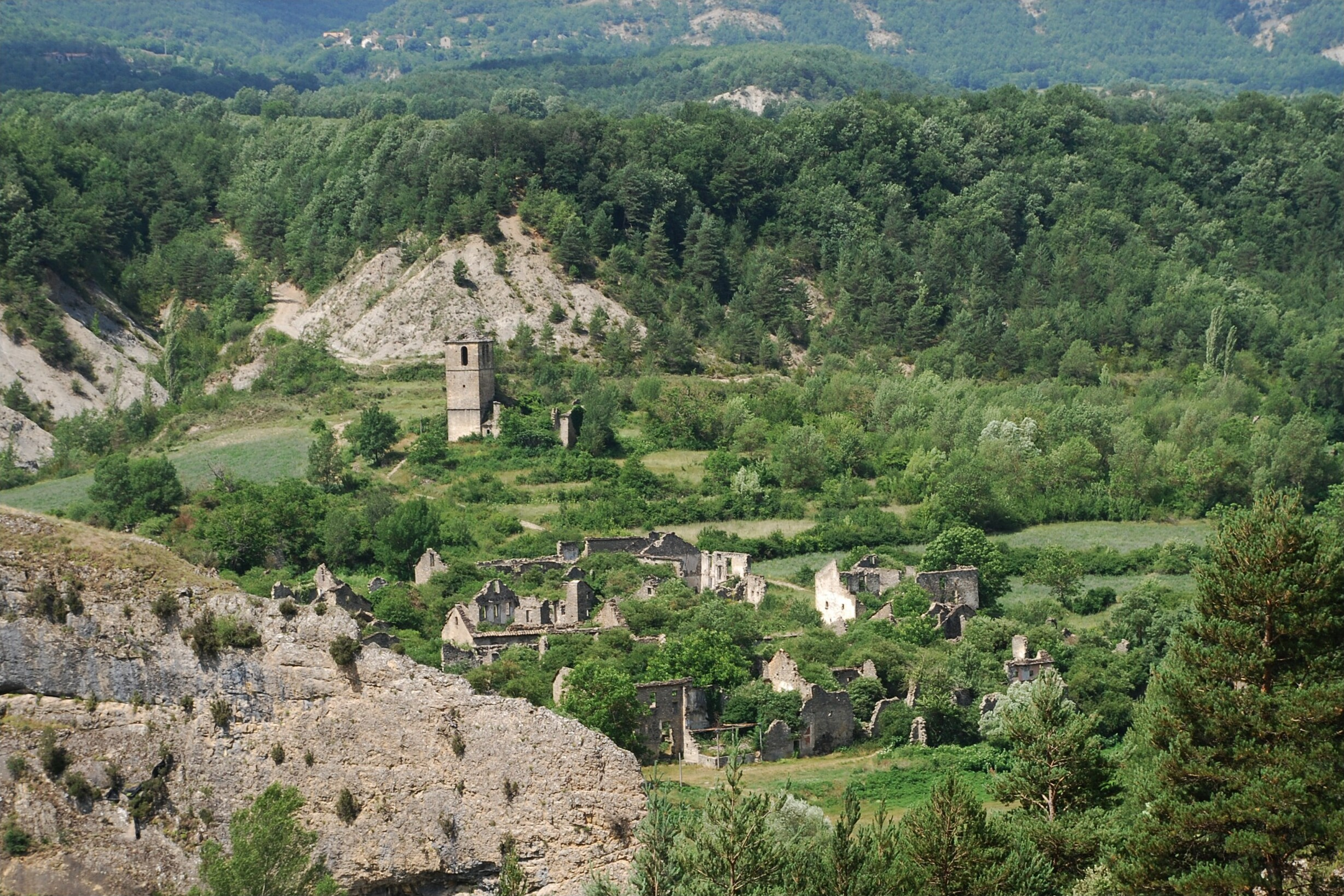

- Location within Aragon Location within Spain
- Coordinates: 42°27′57″N 0°0′12″W
- Country: Spain
- Autonomous community: Aragon
- Province: Province of Huesca
- Municipality: Fiscal, Aragon
- Elevation: 655 m (2,149 ft)

Population
  - Total: 3

Jánovas is a locality located in the municipality of Fiscal, Aragon, in Huesca province, Aragon, Spain. As of 2020, it has a population of 3.

== Geography ==
Jánovas is located 82km northeast of Huesca.
