= Yeba =

Single by Kiss Daniel
- Released: 18 September 2017
- Genre: Afropop; highlife
- Length: 3:18
- Label: G-Worldwide
- Songwriter: Daniel Anidugbe
- Producer: Killertunes

Kiss Daniel singles chronology
"Sofa" (2017)	"Yeba" (2017)	"No Do" (2017)

Music video
- "Yeba" on YouTube

"Yeba" is a song by Nigerian singer Kiss Daniel. It was released on 18 September 2017 by G-Worldwide Entertainment. The Afropop track mixes highlife, 1990s party sounds, and Latin-inspired rhythms, with horns, percussion, and backing vocals, and takes influence from Ebenezer Obey's miliki style. Its music video, directed by Clarence Peters, shows Lagos party scenes across different decades. The song was praised for its melody and instrumentation but received some criticism for a short dialogue about consent, which Kiss Daniel explained on social media.

== Composition ==
"Yeba" is an Afropop song that takes influences from highlife and elements of contemporary Afrobeats production. The track is reminiscent of 1990s highlife and features percussion-heavy instrumentation, horns, drums, and wind instruments, alongside vocal interjections such as "hmm" and "ahh". Its melody includes a call-and-response hook built on Latin-influenced basslines and Afrojuju-style backing vocals. The song also draws from the miliki style of Ebenezer Obey, particularly the rhythm and chord structure of his 1971 song "E Sa Ma Miliki", though it moves at a faster tempo. Lyrically, "Yeba" centers on flirtation and dance-floor interactions.

== Music video ==
The music video for “Yeba” was directed by Clarence Peters and premiered on 7 October 2017. It features Kiss Daniel and a group of dancers in scenes inspired by Lagos party culture. The video uses time jumps that move between different decades, including 2017, 1986, and 1971, showing changing fashion and party scenes such as Afro hairstyles, bell-bottom trousers, adire prints, and palm-wine gatherings.

== Controversy ==
"Yeba" drew criticism for a brief spoken exchange in which a woman says "Uncle stop touching" and a man responds "Sorry madam", which some listeners viewed as referencing sexual harassment. Dayo Bernard, in an article for YNaija, said the dialogue appeared "problematic" and argued that while the song showed "mild sensitivity around consent", it did not meaningfully address harassment and instead risked placing responsibility on women to speak out against misconduct. Lade Tawak, a writer for The Native, also noted that the line caused a "puzzled pause" for listeners and raised questions about whether the song was attempting to comment on the issue or presenting it as a light moment on dance floors. The line circulated widely on social media, where some listeners described it as "molestey" and "counter consent" and said it made inappropriate touching appear normal in social settings. In response to the criticism, Kiss Daniel wrote on Twitter that the song was intended to promote consent, stating that it teaches women to speak out and men to understand that "if a lady says No, No means No", adding that agreeing to dance "doesn't translate to sexual consent".

== Critical reception ==
Toye Sokunbi of The Native praised the song's "fusion of Latin-inspired baseline and Afrojuju backup vocals", saying he "build[s] earworms along the composition with melody hinged on couplets" and adds "an atmospheric layer…that accentuates the overall sensuality". Sokunbi concluded that Kizz Daniel remained "the truest anomaly of a genre usually overwrought with cliches and regurgitated ideas". Oluwatobi Ibironke of tooXclusive said that "Yeba" showed Daniel as an "industry outlier" that would "rather create a trend than jump on one", describing the track as a "90's party themed song with heavy instrumentation" and concluding it was "def def a hit". Daniel Enisan, also reviewing for tooXclusive, praised its "piano sound" and said that "it's no doubt Kiss Daniel is talented", concluding that "not long from now, I see this boy ruling this industry". IfeOluwa Nihinlola, a writer for Music in Africa, noted that the song drew on Ebenezer Obey's miliki style, writing that the "rhythm and chords of 'E Sa Ma Miliki' are brought forward", adding that "it is not about what he is saying, it is about how he makes you feel", and concluding it was "a musical yelp of passable quality".

== Accolades ==
Awards and nominations for "Yeba"
Organization	Year	Category	Result	Ref.
Soundcity MVP Awards Festival	2017	Viewer's Choice	Nominated	
The Headies	2018	Song of the Year	Nominated	
The Headies	2018	Viewer's Choice	Nominated	
The Beatz Awards	2018	Afro Highlife Producer of the Year (Killertunes for "Yeba")	Won	
