= Sarvisé =

- Locality
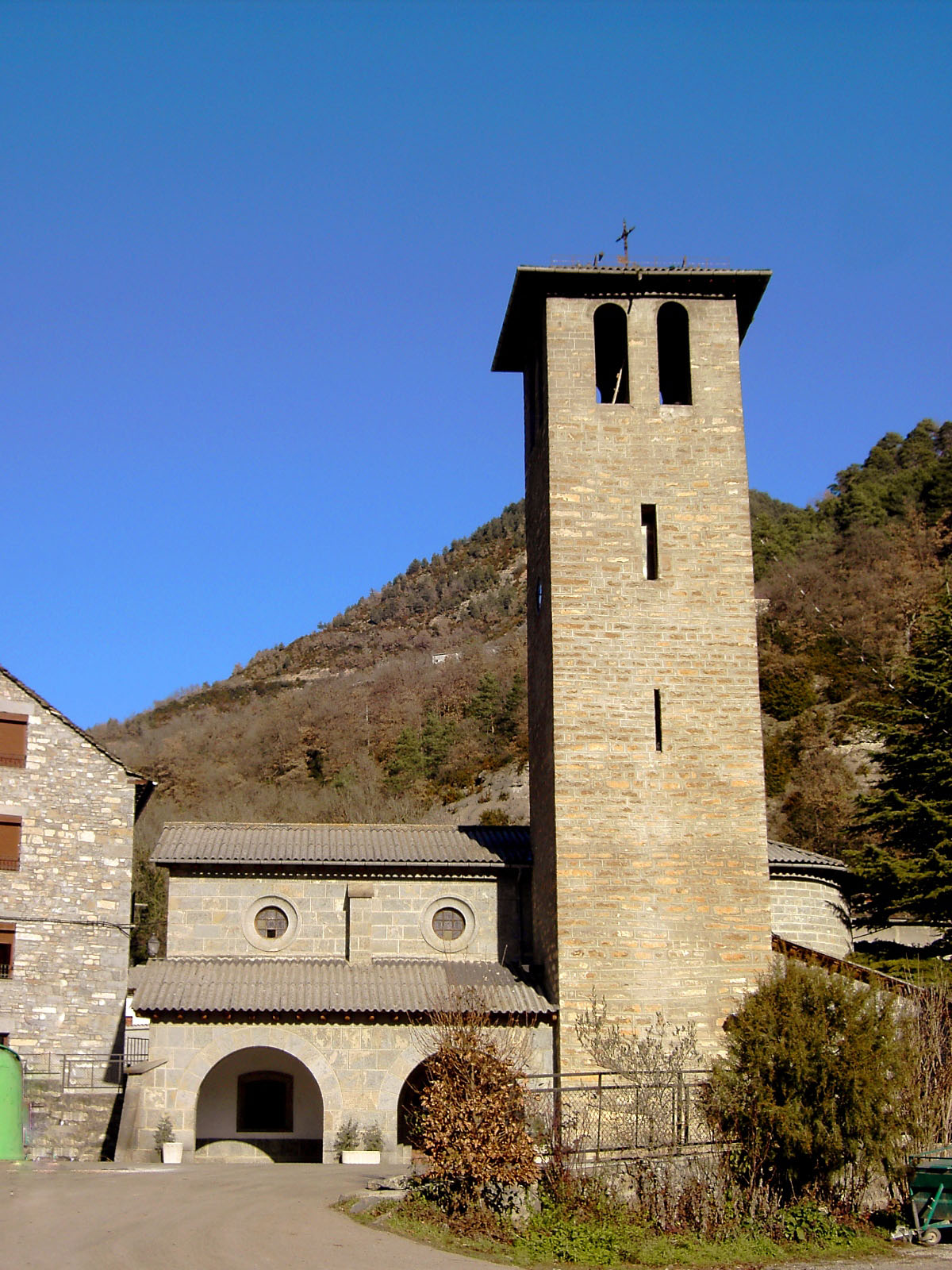

- Location within Aragon Location within Spain
- Coordinates: 42°34′42″N 0°6′48″W
- Country: Spain
- Autonomous community: Aragon
- Province: Province of Huesca
- Municipality: Broto
- Elevation: 866 m (2,841 ft)

Population
  - Total: 100

Sarvisé is a locality located in the municipality of Broto, in Huesca province, Aragon, Spain. As of 2020, it has a population of 100.

== Geography ==
Sarvisé is located 81km north-northeast of Huesca.
