= Conjuratory =

Religious building

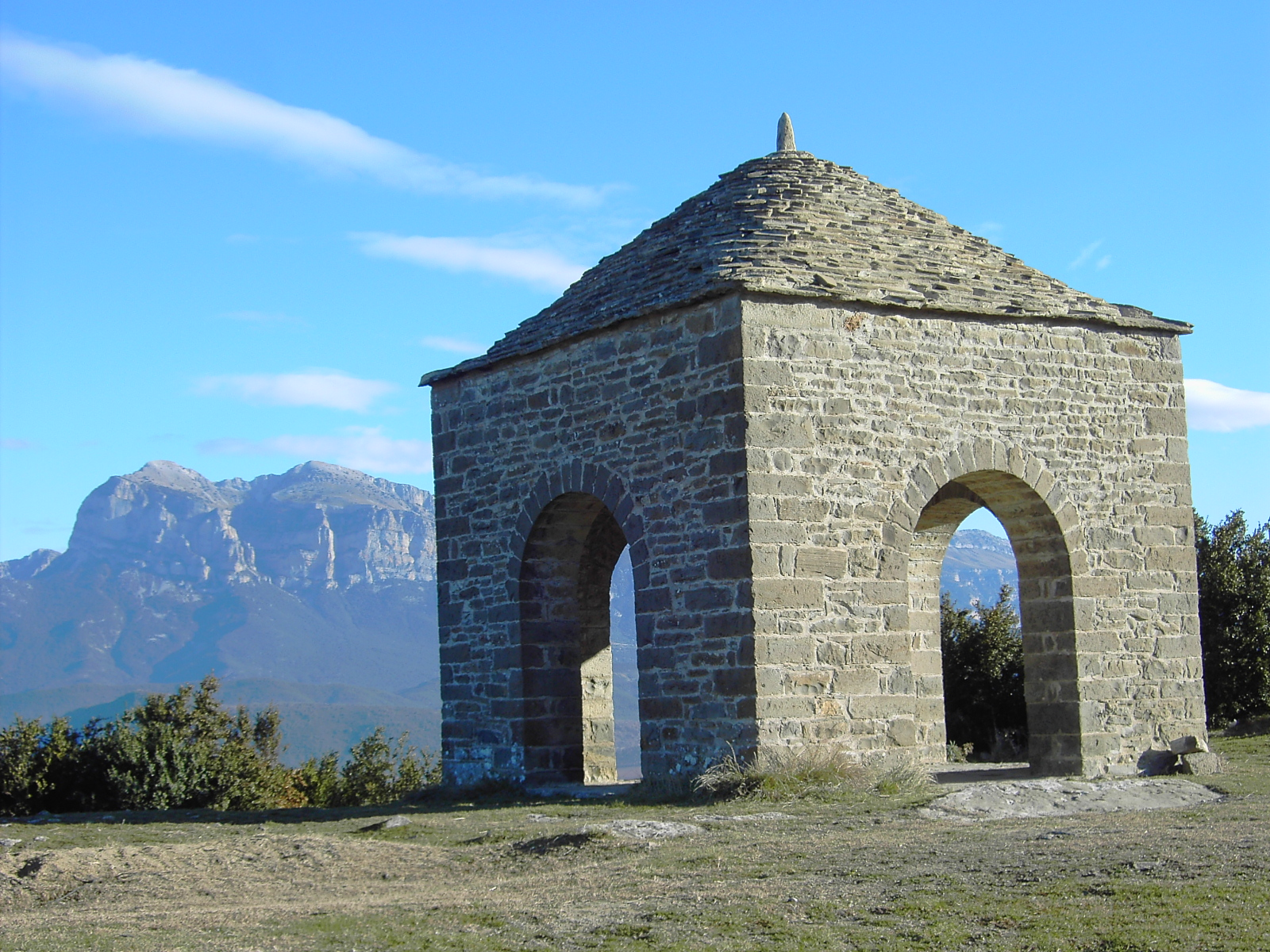
Exconjuratory in Guaso, Aragon. The massive Peña Montañesa is in the background

A conjuratory or exconjuratory (Aragonese: esconchurador, Catalan: comunidor, Spanish: conjuratorio) is a small religious building from which ceremonies were conducted to bless the fields and ward off calamities caused by the weather, like storms, hail and excessive rain that could ruin the harvests. Usually these buildings are attached to a church building or a hermitage.

Exconjuratories were common in the ancient villages of the Pre-Pyrenees and the Pyrenees, especially in Aragon.

== Description ==
Exconjuratories were usually built in a symmetrical way, with large windows open to the four cardinal points.

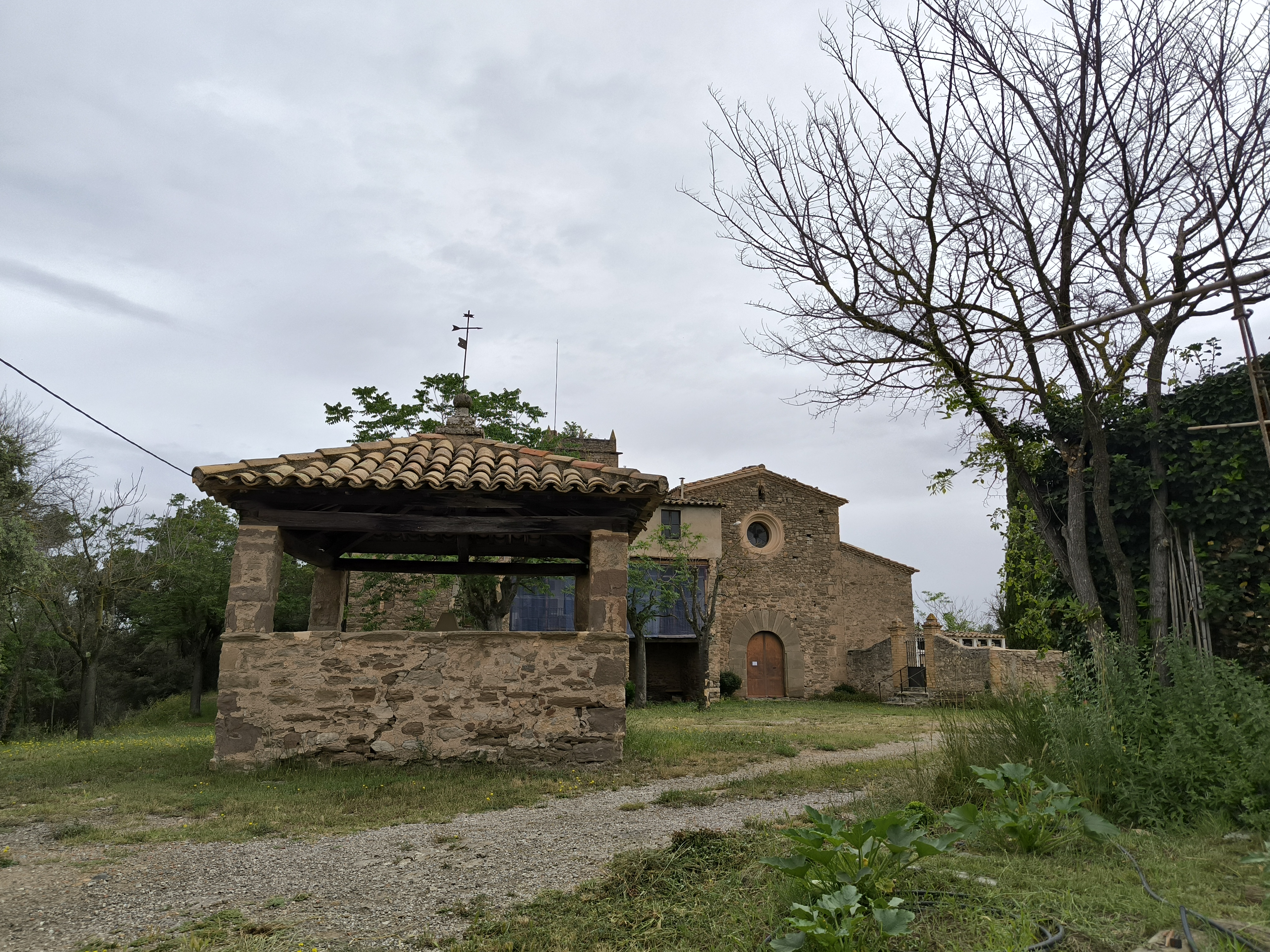
Comunidor de Sant Joan d'Oló

In some places the exconjuratory is part of the bell tower of a church. On the fourth floor of the main tower of the Cathedral of Murcia there are four conjuratories. Located in each corner, special ceremonies were conducted in them by priests to ward off storms that could spoil the harvest in the fields by means of the Lignum Crucis kept in the cathedral. Other towns in the Region of Murcia like Cieza, had conjuratories as well. Conjuratories could also be used to ward off other non-weather-related catastrophical events afflicting the community, like epidemics and crop-damaging pests, like locusts.

They fell into disuse centuries ago and many of the exconjuratories that have survived are in a ruined state.

== Rituals ==
The Tentenublo (in Spanish) is an example of the prayers conducted in special occasions within the conjuratories:

| Tentenublo, tente en ti, no te caigas sobre mí; guarda el pan, guarda el vino, guarda los campos, que están floridos | Stay, O cloud, stay put, don't fall over me; save the bread, save the wine, preserve the fields in blossom |

== Gallery ==
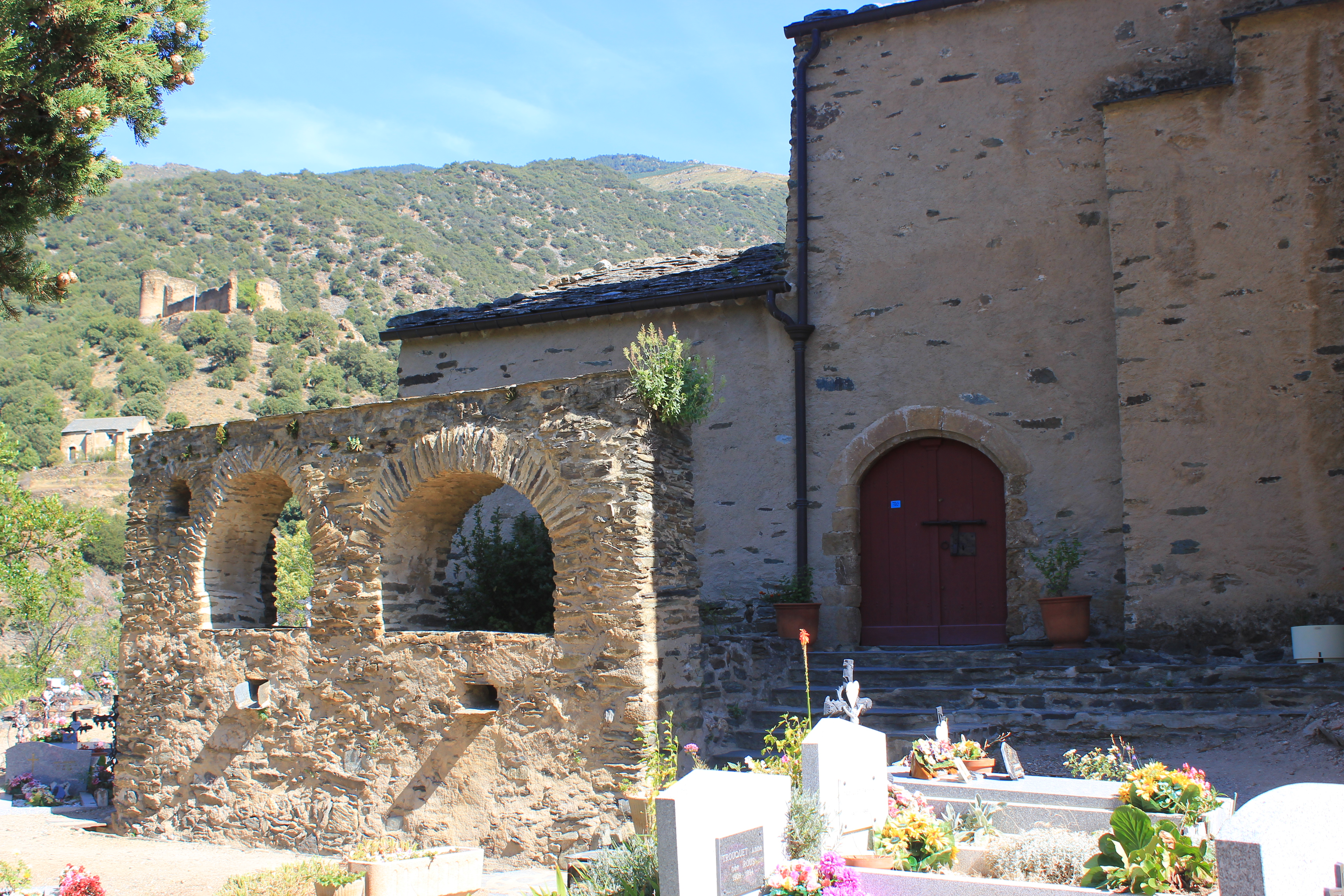
Ruined exconjuratory in the Saint André church, Èvol, Pyrénées Orientales, France

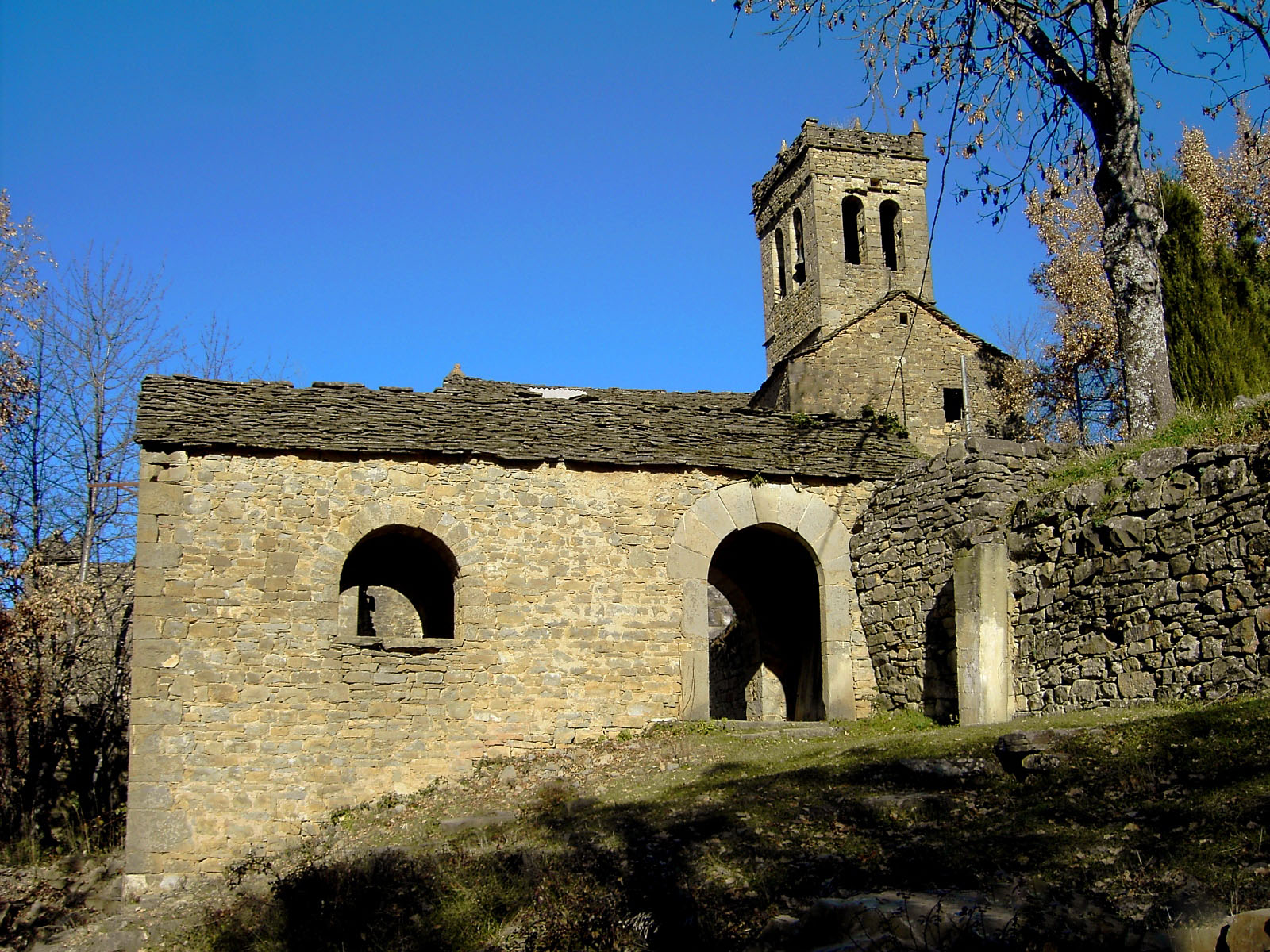
Exconjuratory in Asín de Broto, Aragon

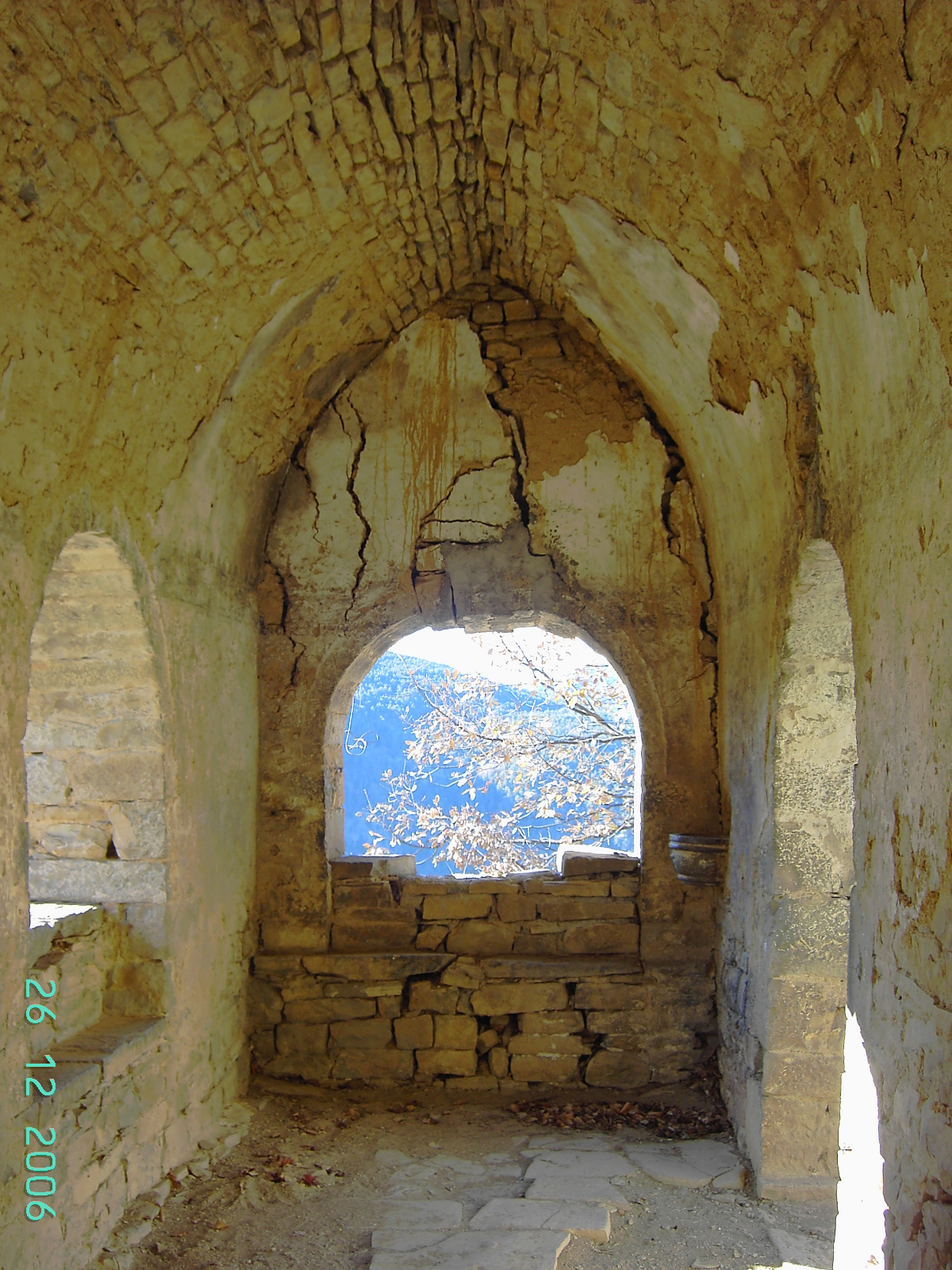
Interior of the exconjuratory in Asin de Broto

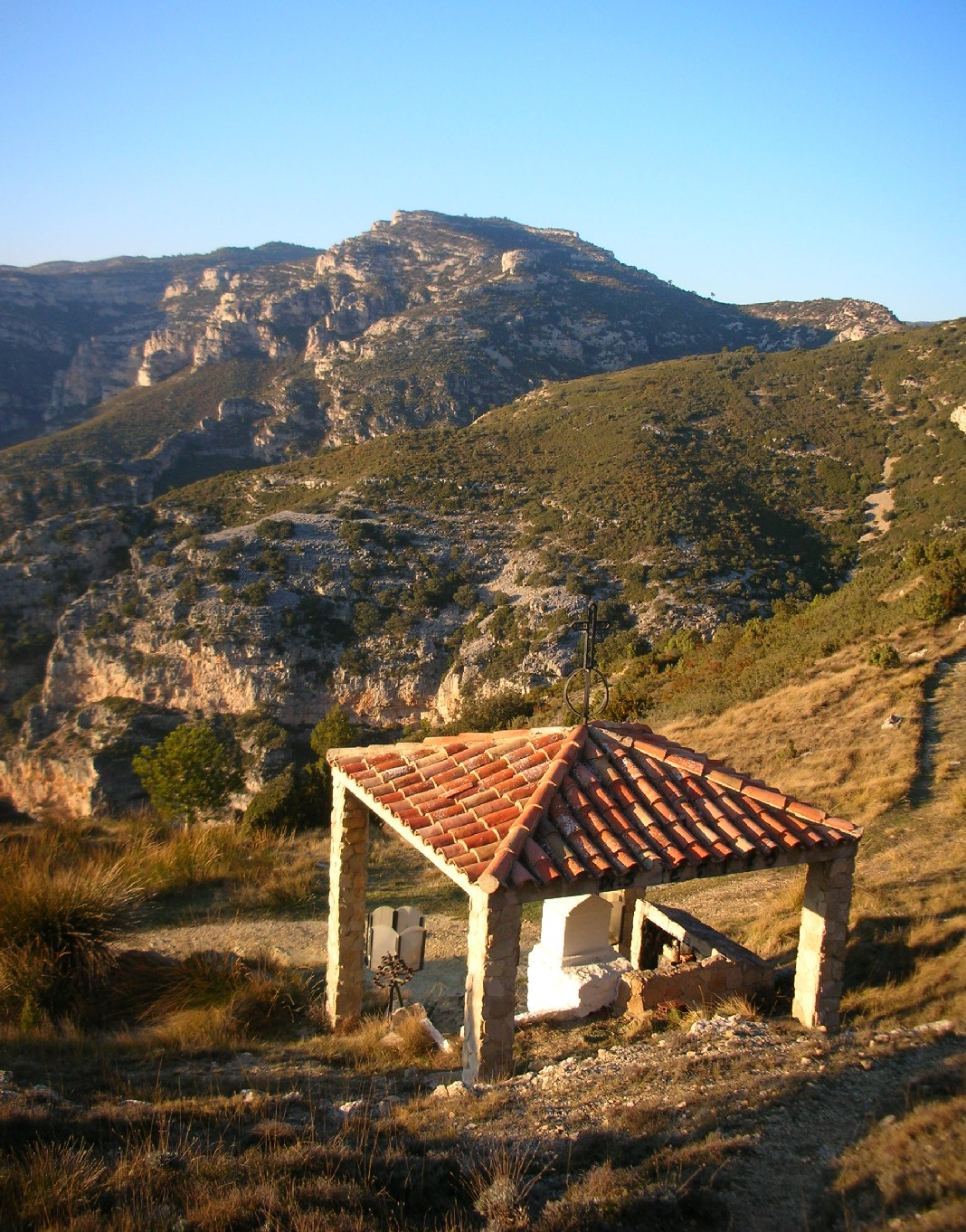
Exconjuratory at Pallerols, Ports de Beseit, close to La Sénia

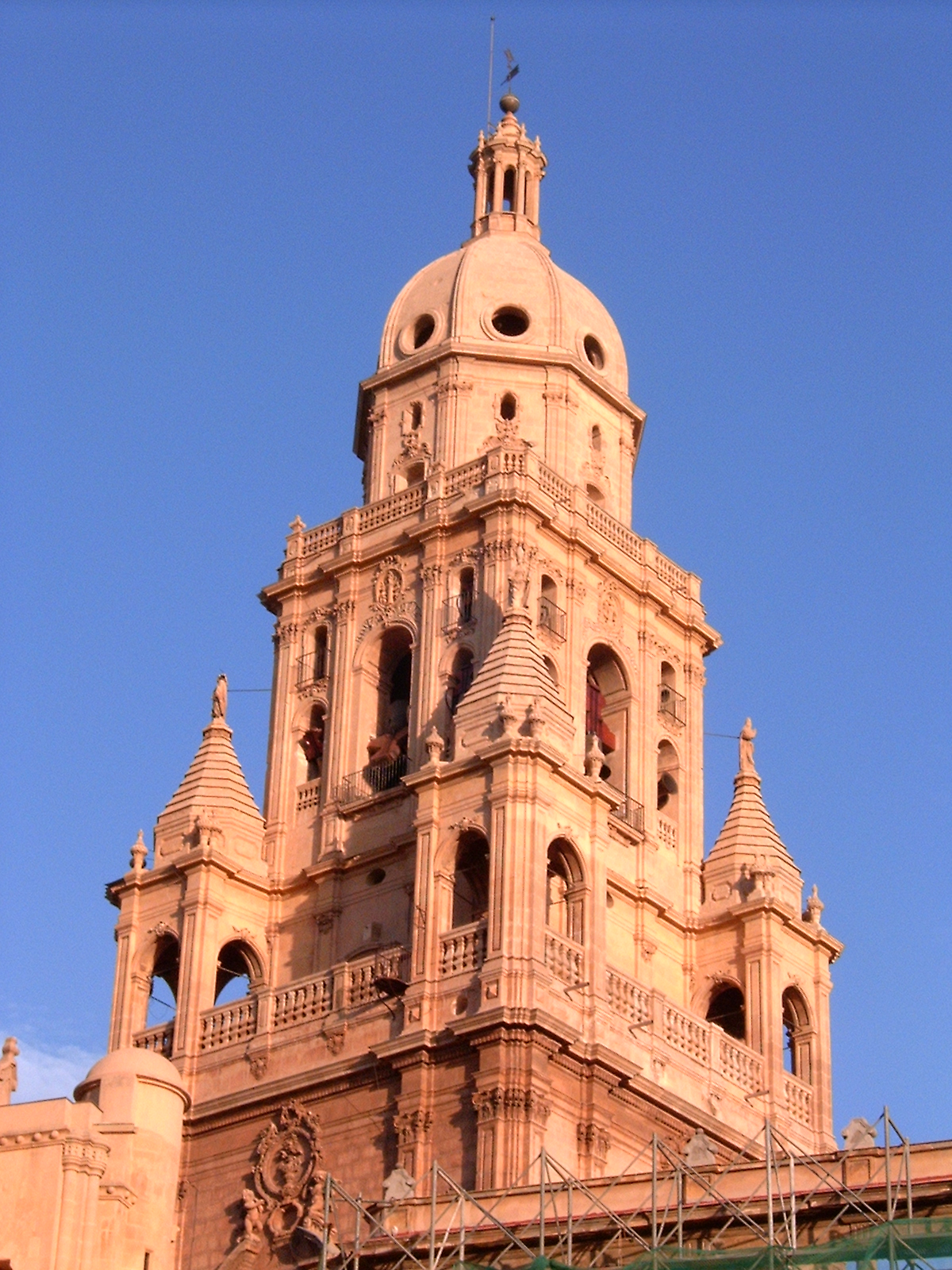
Cathedral of Murcia bell tower showing the conjuratories located in the corners of the third tier

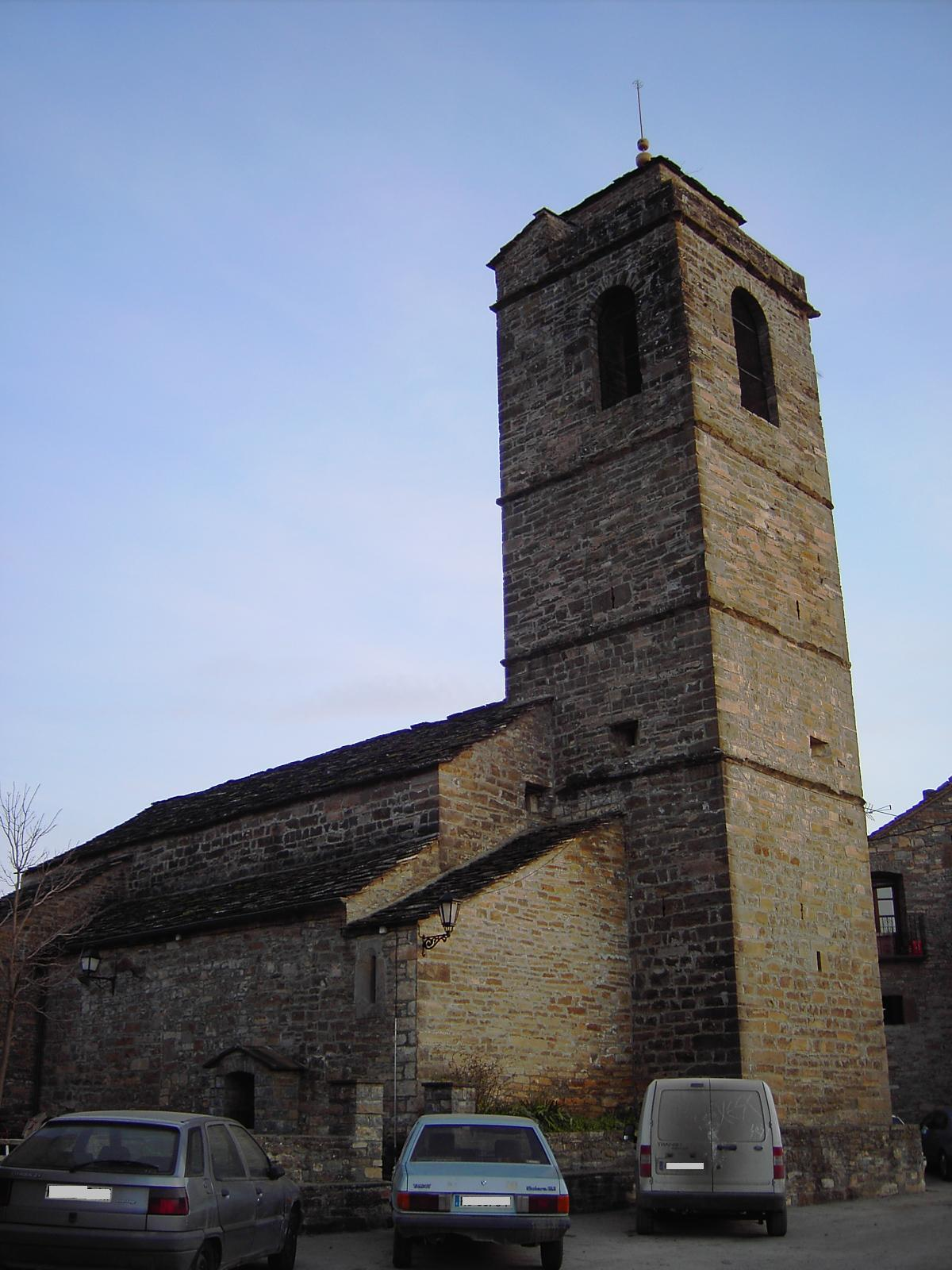
The church of El Pueyo de Araguás has a conjuratory up in the bell tower

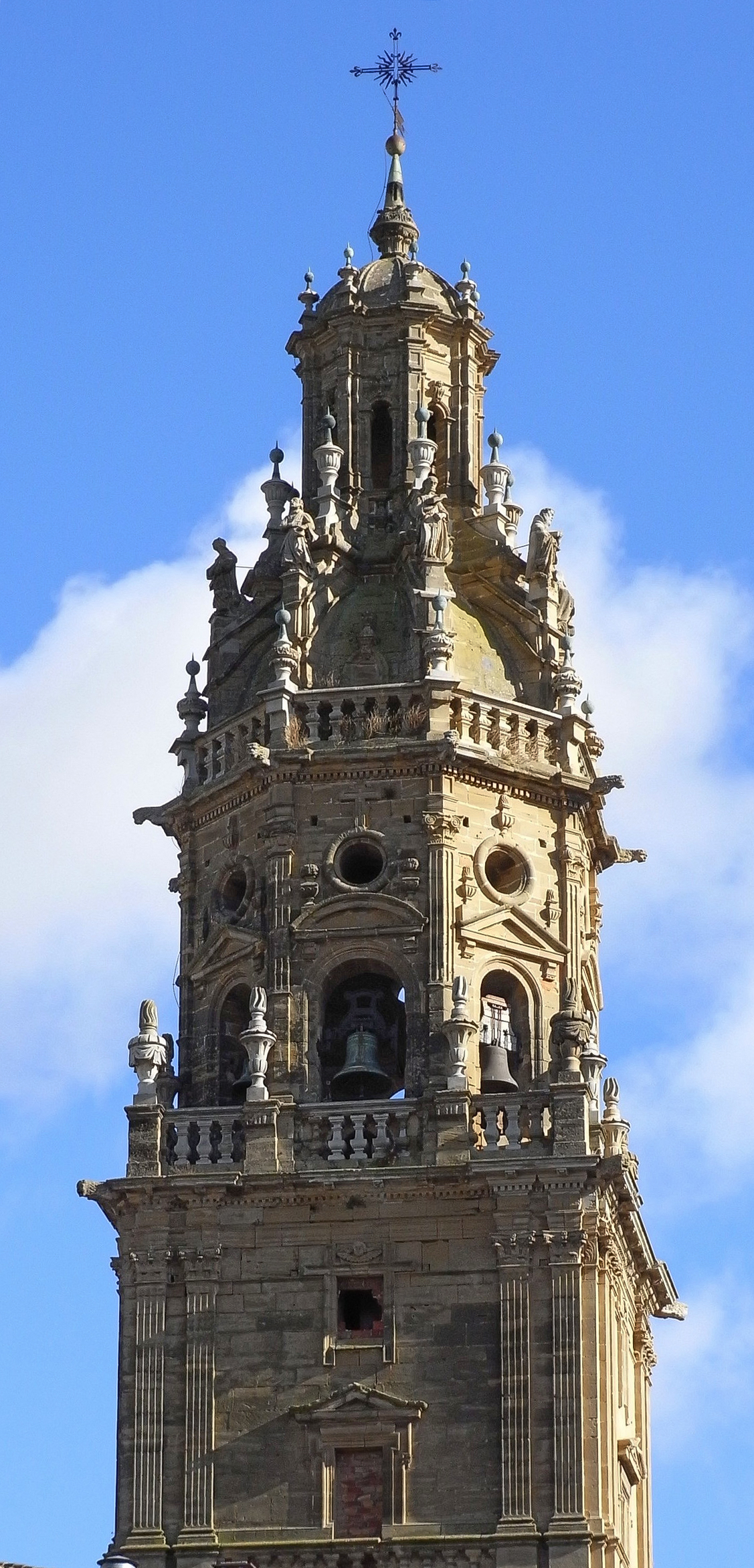
The Santo Tomás parish church in Haro, La Rioja also has a conjuratory in its bell tower

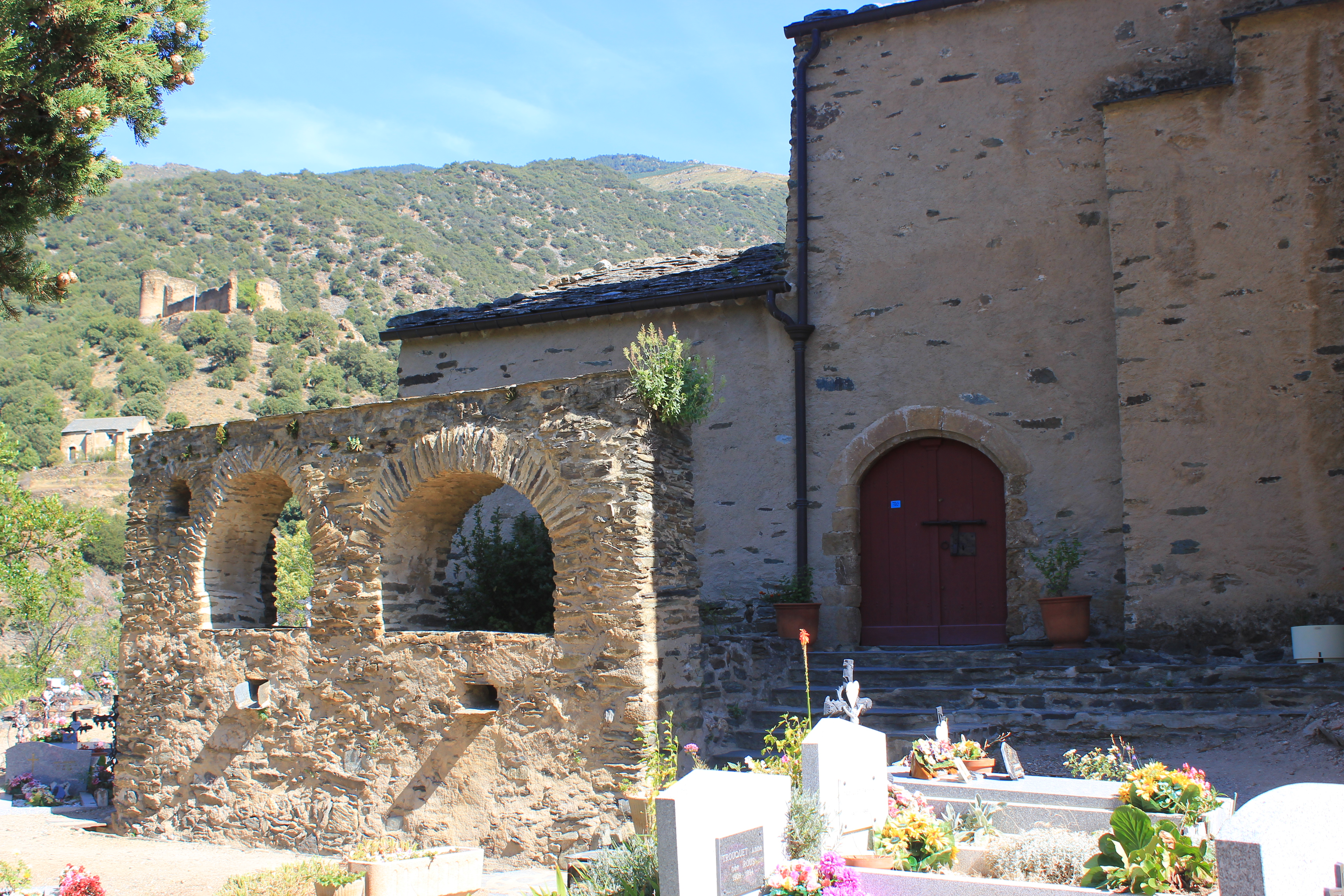
Conjuratory in front of the Saint-André d'Évol Church
