= Olette =

- Commune
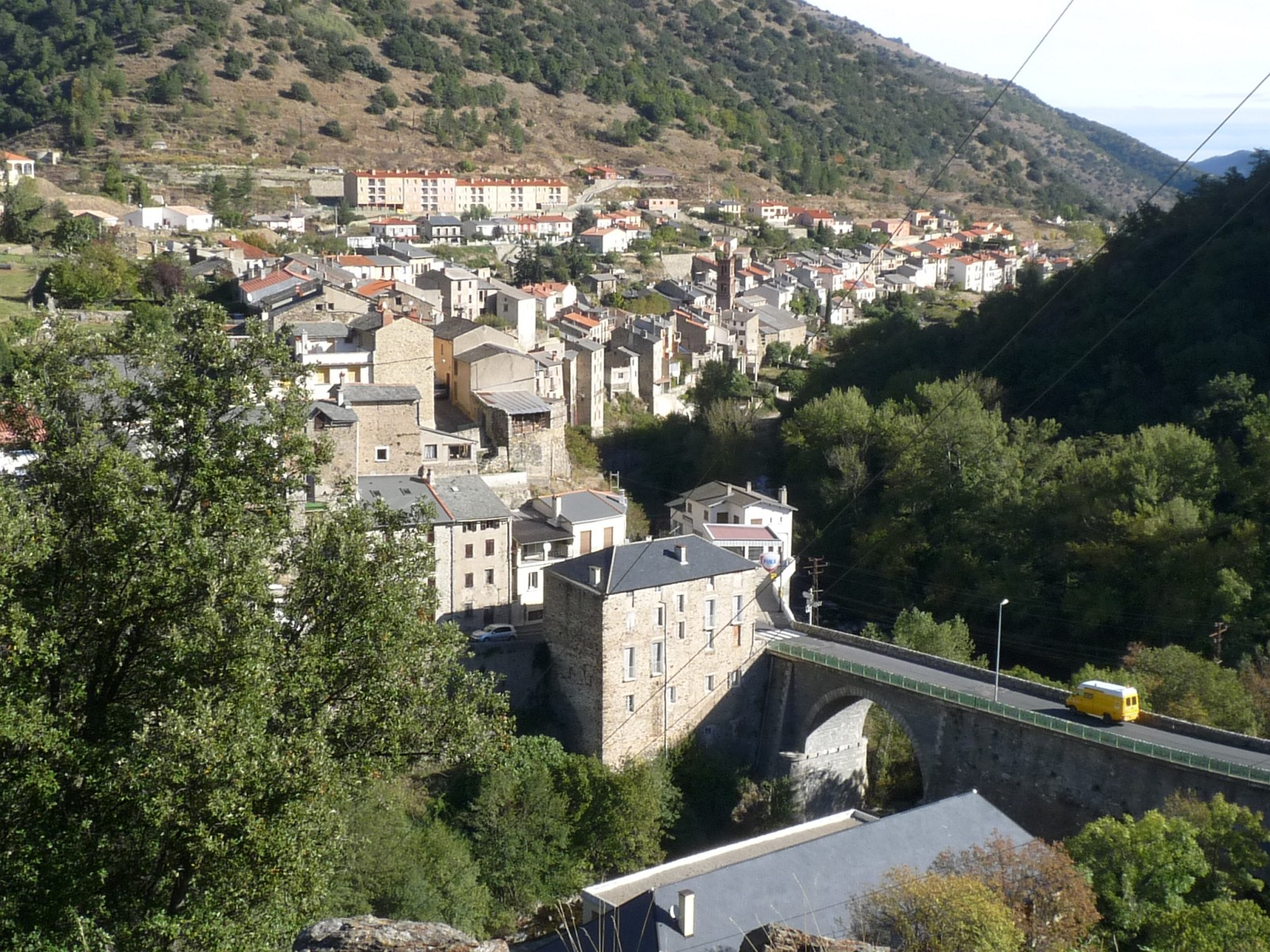
- A general view of Olette

- Coat of arms
- Location of Olette
- Location within France Location within Occitanie
- Coordinates: 42°33′22″N 2°16′14″E
- Country: France
- Region: Occitania
- Department: Pyrénées-Orientales
- Arrondissement: Prades
- Canton: Les Pyrénées catalanes

Government
  - Mayor (2020–2026): Jean-Louis Jallat
- Area^{1}: 28.95 km^{2} (11.18 sq mi)
- Elevation: 630 m (2,070 ft)
- Highest elevation: 2,361 m (7,746 ft)
- Lowest elevation: 563 m (1,847 ft)
- Population (2023): 360
  - Density: 12/km^{2} (32/sq mi)
- Time zone: UTC+01:00 (CET)
  - Summer (DST): UTC+02:00 (CEST)
- INSEE/Postal code: 66125 /66360
- ^{1} French Land Register data, which excludes lakes, ponds, glaciers > 1 km^{2} (0.386 sq mi or 247 acres) and river estuaries.

Olette (French pronunciation: [ɔlɛt]; Catalan: Oleta i Èvol) is a commune in the Pyrénées-Orientales department in southern France. Its village of Évol is a member of Les Plus Beaux Villages de France (The Most Beautiful Villages of France) Association.

== Geography ==
Olette is located in the canton of Les Pyrénées catalanes and in the arrondissement of Prades. Olette-Canaveilles-les-Bains station has rail connections to Villefranche-de-Conflent and Latour-de-Carol.

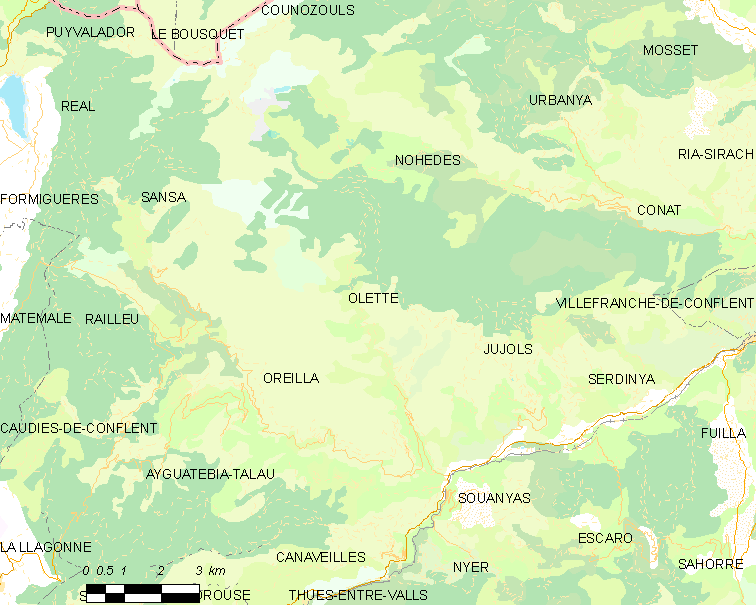
Map of Olette and its surrounding communes

== Demography ==
Historical population
Year	Pop.	±% p.a.
1968	680	—
1975	544	−3.14%
1982	532	−0.32%
1990	447	−2.15%
1999	345	−2.84%
2007	401	+1.90%
2012	393	−0.40%
2017	364	−1.52%
2023	360	−0.18%
Source: INSEE

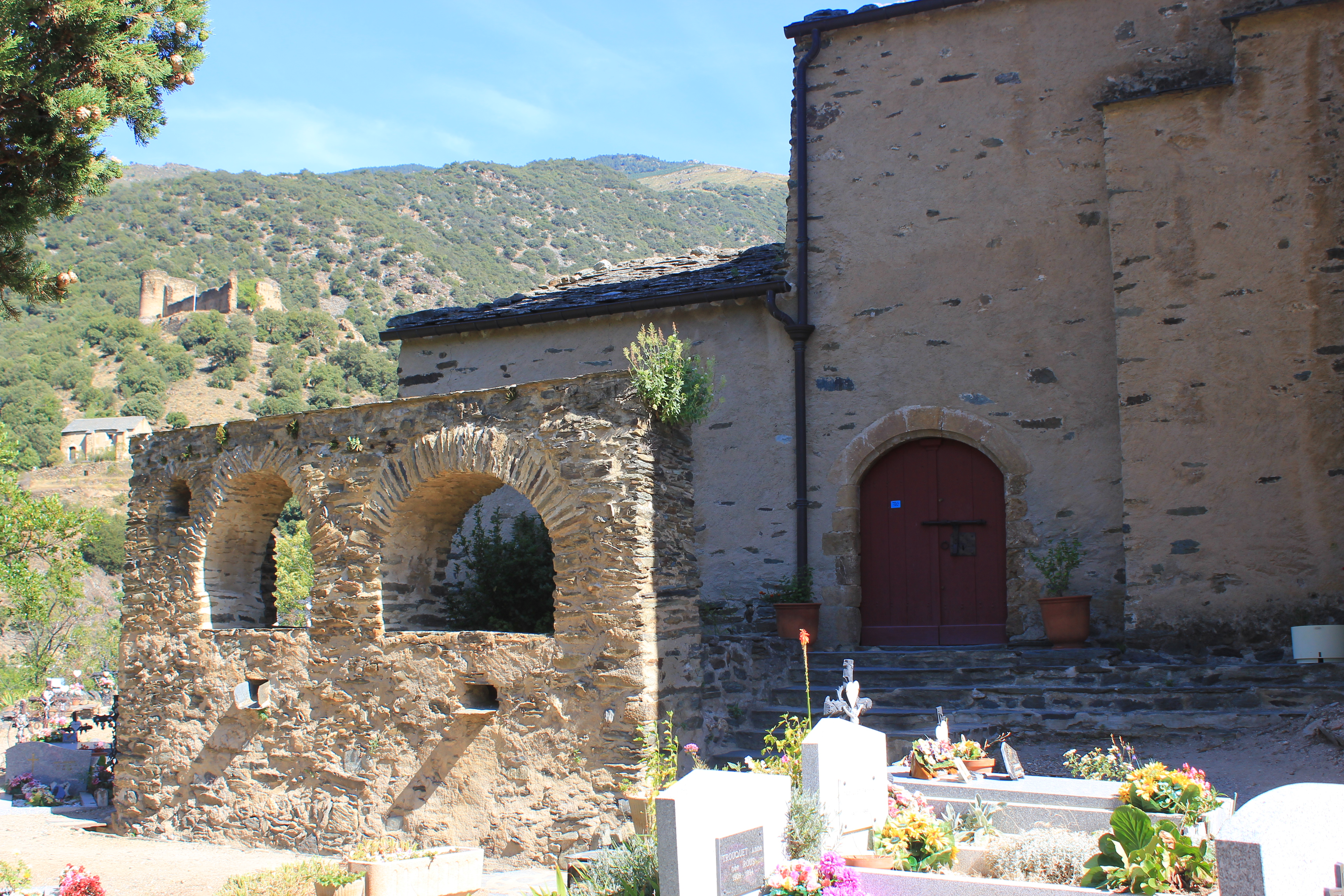
Ruined conjuratory in the Saint André church, Evol

== See also ==
- Communes of the Pyrénées-Orientales department
- Saint-André d'Évol Church
