= La Fueva =

La Fueva (Spanish) A Fueba (Aragonese)
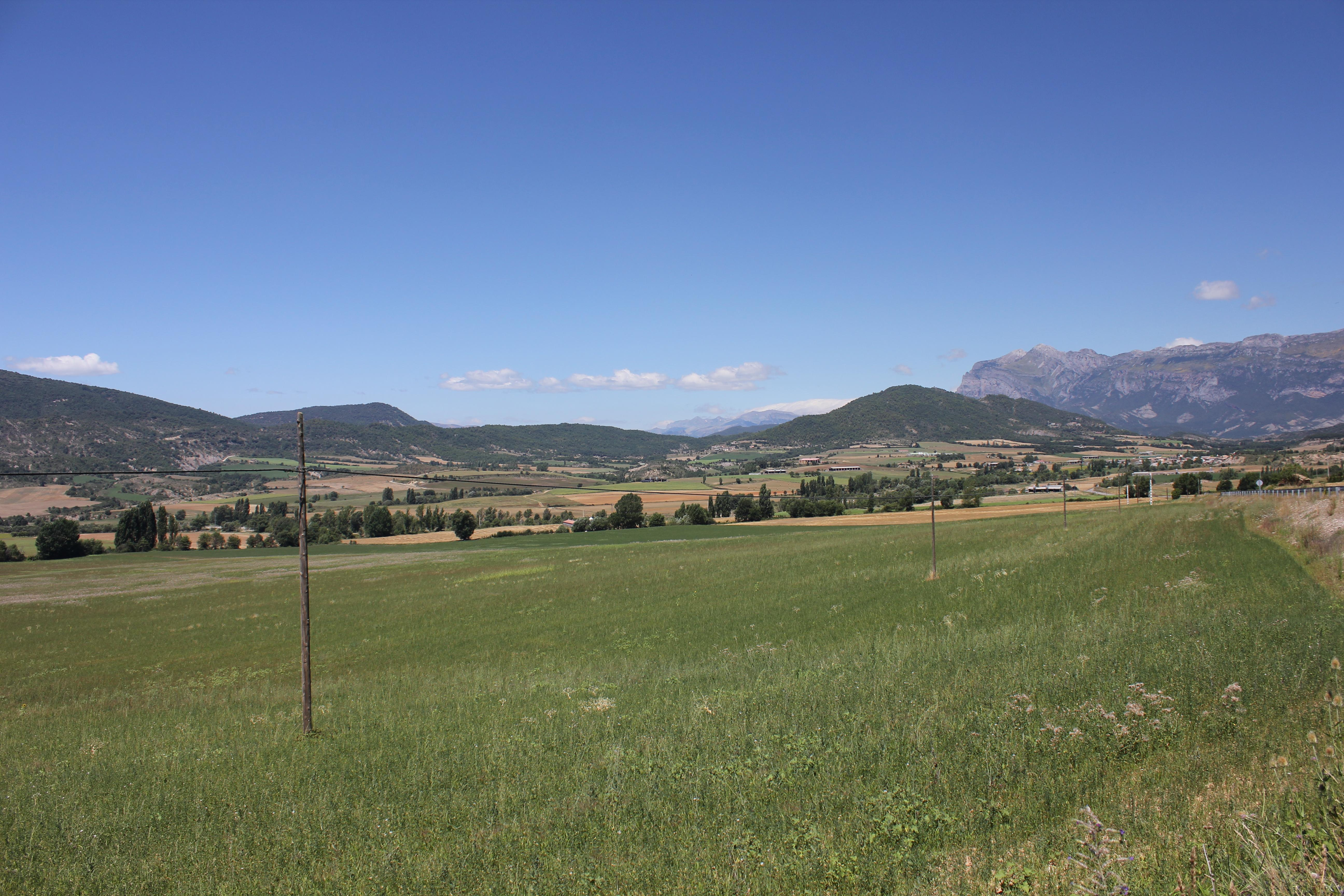
- Landscape in La Fueva.

- Coat of arms

- Location in Spain.
- Coordinates: 42°22′11″N 0°16′20″W
- Country: Spain
- Autonomous community: Aragon
- Province: Huesca
- Comarca: Sobrarbe

Government
  - Mayor: José Ramón Laplana Buetas

Area
  - Total: 218.85 km^{2} (84.50 sq mi)
- Elevation: 630 m (2,070 ft)

Population (2025-01-01)
  - Total: 597
  - Density: 2.73/km^{2} (7.07/sq mi)
- Demonym: Fuevanos or Fovanos
- Time zone: UTC+1 (CET)
  - Summer (DST): UTC+2 (CEST)

La Fueva (in Aragonese: A Fueba; and officially "La Fueva-A Fueba") is a municipality located in the province of Huesca, Aragon, western Spain. As of 2010, the municipality has a population of 619 inhabitants.

The main settlement, and municipal seat, is the village of Tierrantona. The ruins of the Real Monasterio de San Victorián are located in La Fueva municipal term, at the feet of the Peña Montañesa.

Other notable features in the municipality include Cerro de Charo, a small hill.

== See also ==
- List of municipalities in Huesca
