= Tierrantona =

- Locality
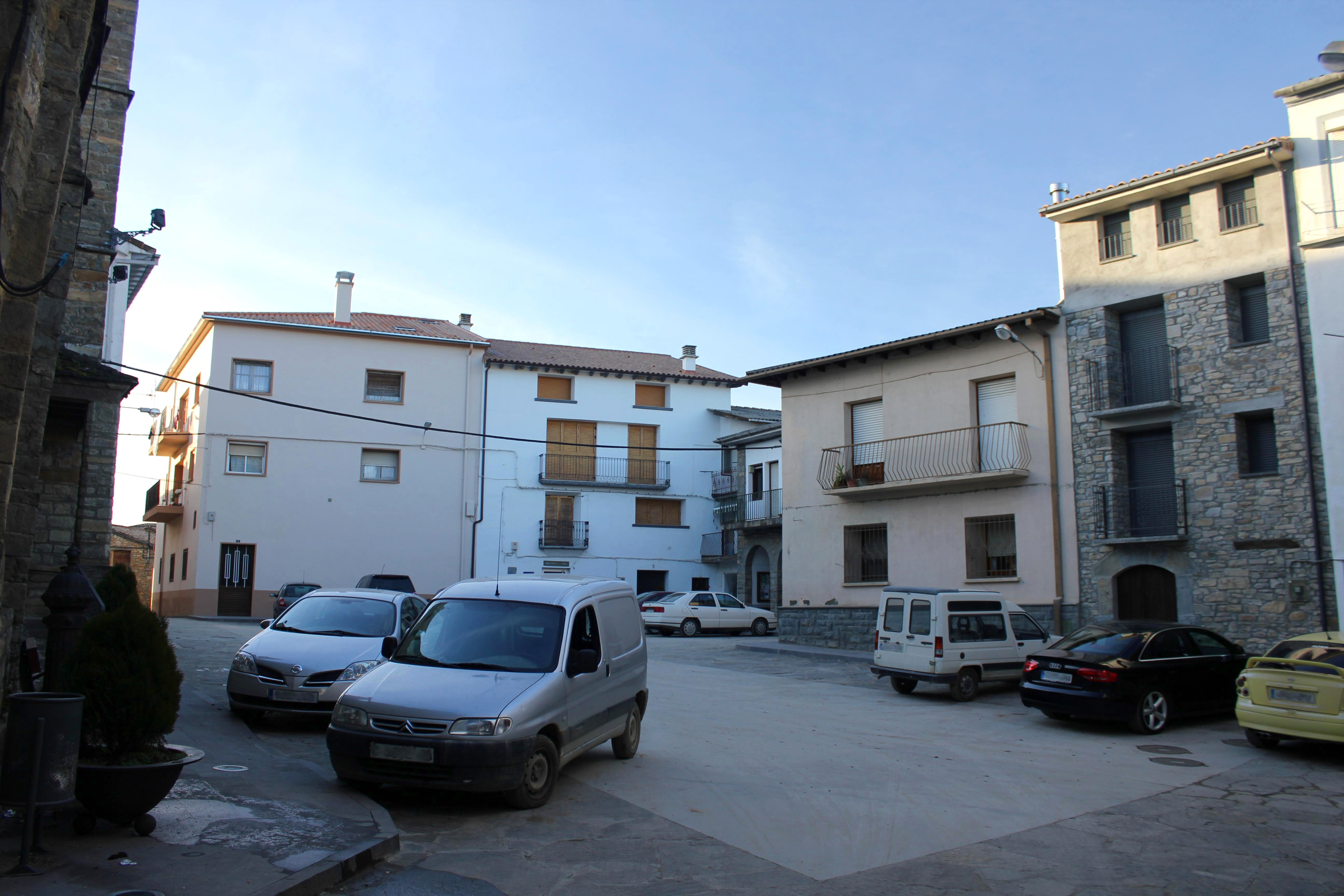

- Location within Aragon Location within Spain
- Coordinates: 42°22′13″N 0°16′21″E
- Country: Spain
- Autonomous community: Aragon
- Province: Province of Huesca
- Municipality: La Fueva
- Elevation: 636 m (2,087 ft)

Population
  - Total: 108

Tierrantona is a locality and the capital of the municipality of La Fueva, in Huesca province, Aragon, Spain. As of 2020, it has a population of 108.

== Geography ==
Tierrantona is located 114km east-northeast of Huesca.
