= Los Molinos (Sobrarbe) =

- Locality
- Location within Aragon Location within Spain
- Coordinates: 42°26′58″N 0°12′20″E
- Country: Spain
- Autonomous community: Aragon
- Province: Province of Huesca
- Municipality: El Pueyo de Araguás
- Elevation: 812 m (2,664 ft)

Population
  - Total: 14

Los Molinos is a locality located in the municipality of El Pueyo de Araguás, in Huesca province, Aragon, Spain. As of 2020, it has a population of 14.

== Geography ==
Los Molinos is located 112km northeast of Huesca.
