= El Pueyo de Araguás =

El Pueyo de Araguás O Pueyo d'Araguás
- Municipality
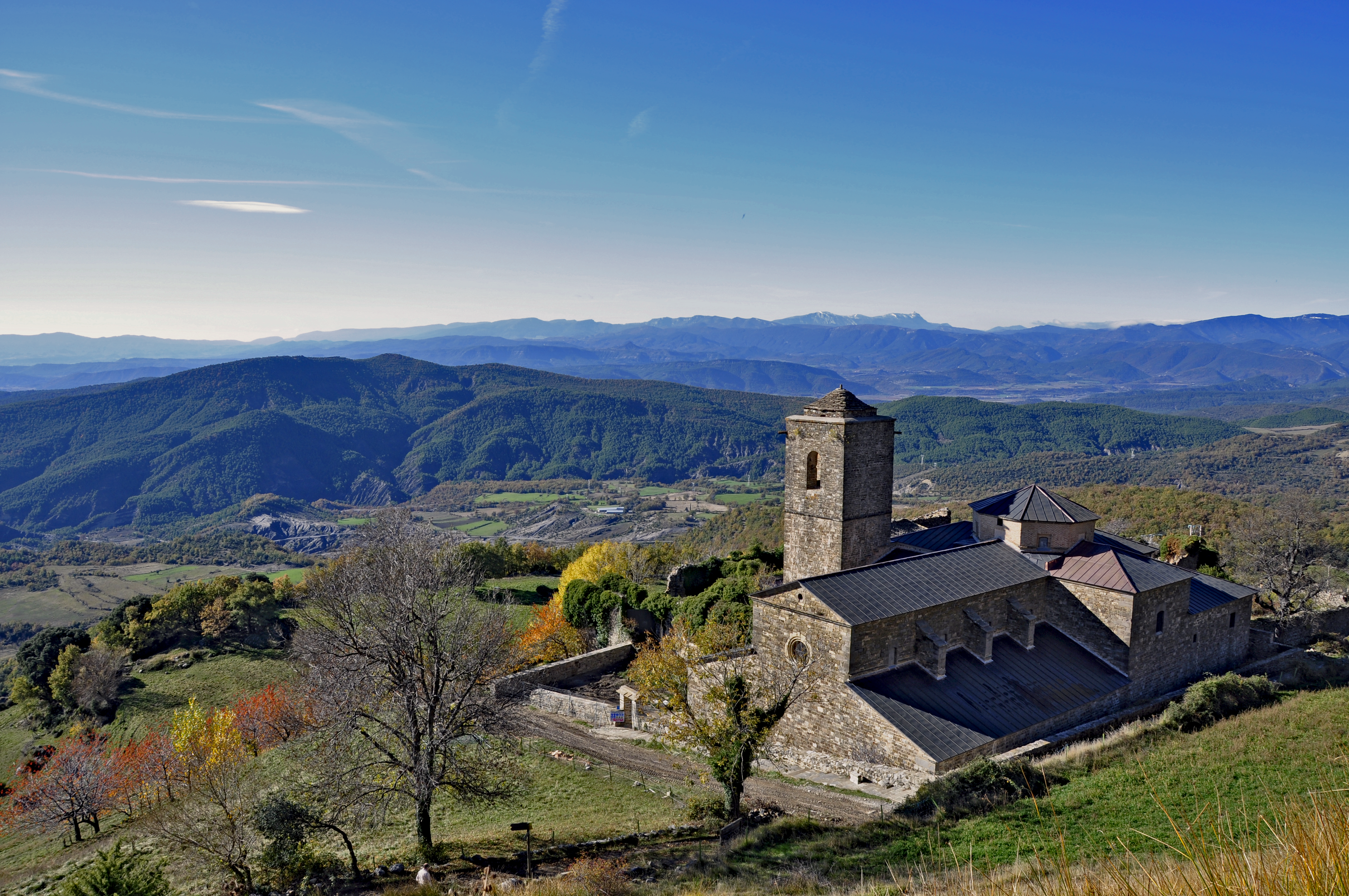
- The Monastery of San Victorián

- Flag Coat of arms

- Location of El Pueyo de Araguás within Aragon Location of El Pueyo de Araguás within Spain
- Coordinates: 42°26′N 0°10′E
- Country: Spain
- Autonomous community: Aragon
- Province: Huesca
- Comarca: Sobrarbe

Area
  - Total: 61 km^{2} (24 sq mi)

Population (2025-01-01)
  - Total: 180
  - Density: 3.0/km^{2} (7.6/sq mi)
- Time zone: UTC+1 (CET)
  - Summer (DST): UTC+2 (CEST)
- Website: elpueyodearaguas.com

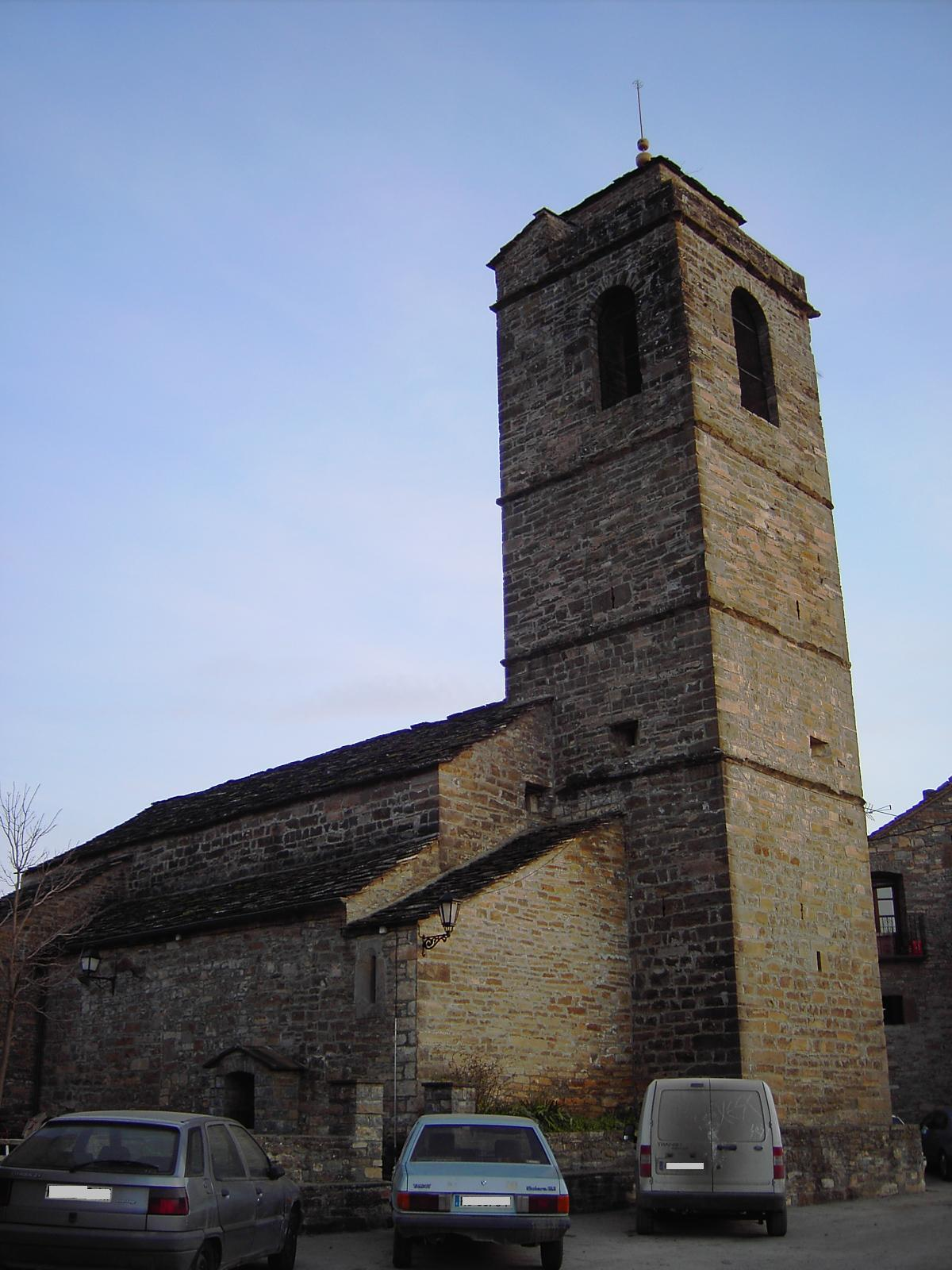
The church of El Pueyo de Araguás has a conjuratory up in the bell tower

El Pueyo de Araguás (in Aragonese: O Pueyo d'Araguás) is a municipality located in the province of Huesca, Aragon, Spain. According to the 2018 census (INE), the municipality has a population of 154 inhabitants.

== Villages ==
Araguás, Los Molinos, La Muera, Oncíns, La Pardina del Soto, El Plano, El Pueyo de Araguás, San Lorién, San Victorián de Asán, El Soto and Torrelisa.

== See also ==
- Peña Montañesa
- Real Monasterio de San Victorián
