= Oncíns =

- Locality
- Oncins
- Location within Aragon Location within Spain
- Coordinates: 42°27′53″N 0°12′28″E
- Country: Spain
- Autonomous community: Aragon
- Province: Province of Huesca
- Municipality: El Pueyo de Araguás
- Elevation: 1,059 m (3,474 ft)

Population
  - Total: 18

Oncíns or Oncins is a locality located in the municipality of El Pueyo de Araguás, in Huesca province, Aragon, Spain. As of 2020, it has a population of 18.

== Geography ==
Oncíns is located 115km northeast of Huesca.
