= Royal Monastery of San Victorián =

Monastery in La Fueva, Spain

Coordinates: 42°27′27″N 0°13′16″E

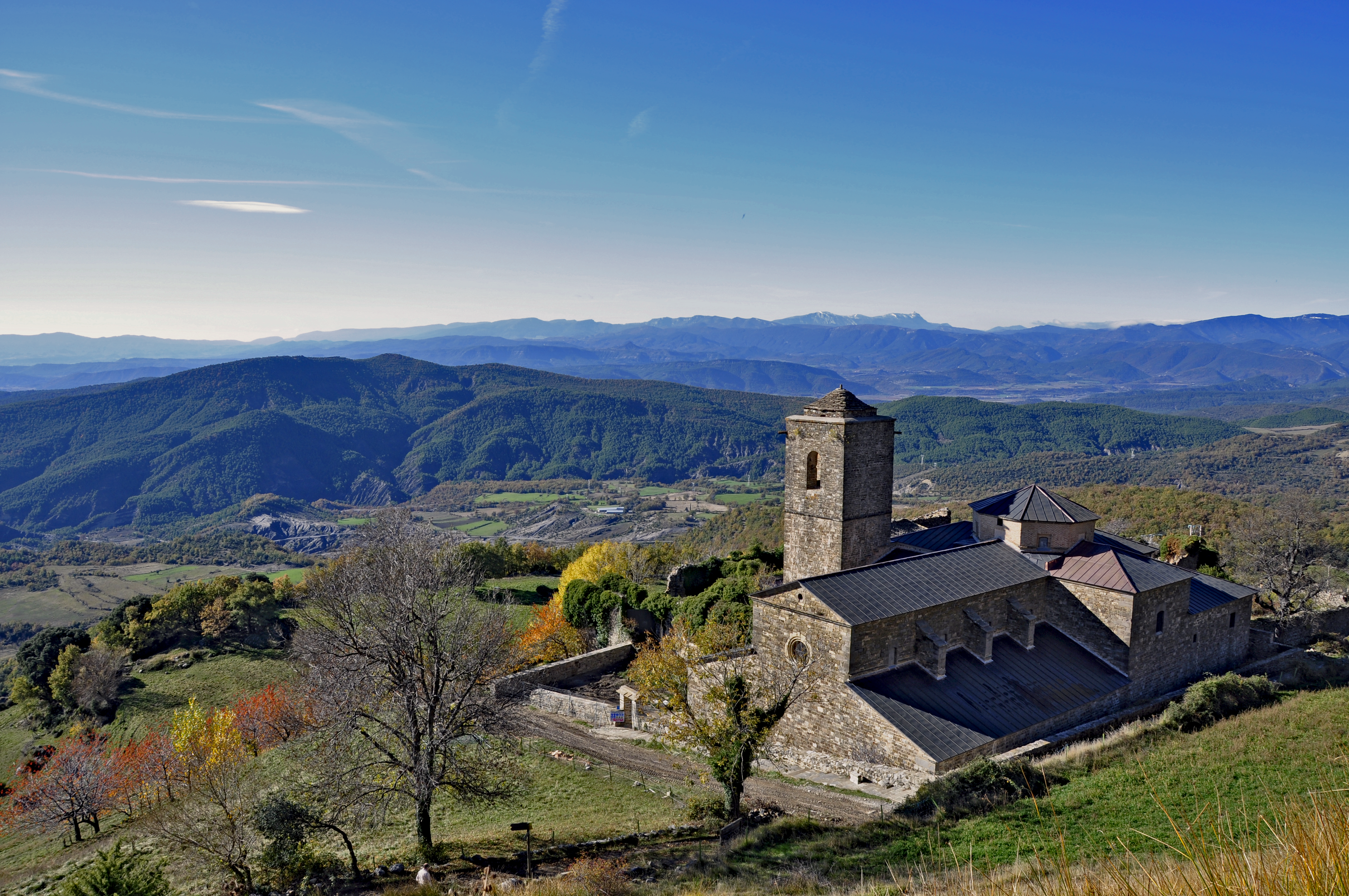

Real Monasterio de San Victorián is a monastery at the feet of Peña Montañesa, Sobrarbe, Aragon, Spain. It was established in the 11th century.

It is located in La Fueva municipal term, near Pueyo de Araguás.

King Ramiro I of Aragon made important donations to the monastery, including two families of slaves -that of Oriolus and his wife Elo, from Villa Alascore, and that of another man, wife and children, from Villa Luzares-, and their properties and their descendants, in perpetuity:

...concedo supradicto monasterio unum hominem, in villa Alascore nomine Oriolus, cum uxore sua Elo, et alium hominem in villa Luzares cum filiis et filiabus suis... hos homines dono jam dicto monasterio cum domibus et uxoribus suis, et cum universis posteritatibus suis, et com omnibus que possident, vel in antea augmentare, comparare, vel escalidare potuerint, ipsi et omnes generationes eorum per secula seculorum.
