= Araguás =

- Locality
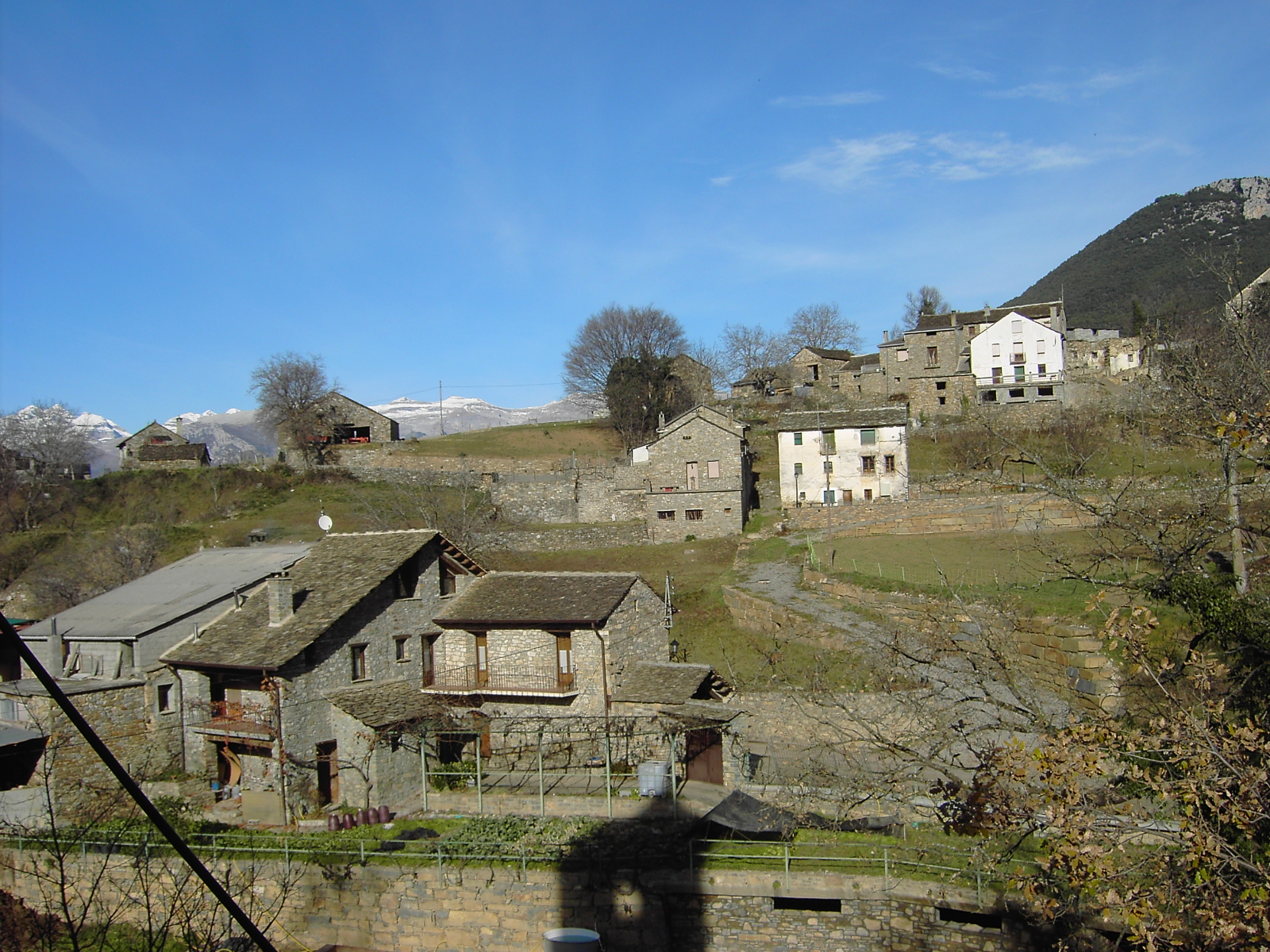

- Location within Aragon Location within Spain
- Coordinates: 42°28′20″N 0°9′42″E
- Country: Spain
- Autonomous community: Aragon
- Province: Province of Huesca
- Municipality: El Pueyo de Araguás
- Elevation: 695 m (2,280 ft)

Population
  - Total: 17

Araguás is a locality located in the municipality of El Pueyo de Araguás, in Huesca province, Aragon, Spain. As of 2020, it has a population of 17.

== Geography ==
Araguás is located 109km northeast of Huesca.
