= Laspuña =

Coordinates: 42°30′N 0°10′E

Laspuña (Spanish) A Espunya (Aragonese)
- Interactive map of Laspuña (Spanish)
- Country: Spain
- Autonomous community: Aragon
- Province: Huesca
- Comarca: Sobrarbe

Area
  - Total: 45 km^{2} (17 sq mi)

Population (2025-01-01)
  - Total: 277
  - Density: 6.2/km^{2} (16/sq mi)
- Time zone: UTC+1 (CET)
  - Summer (DST): UTC+2 (CEST)

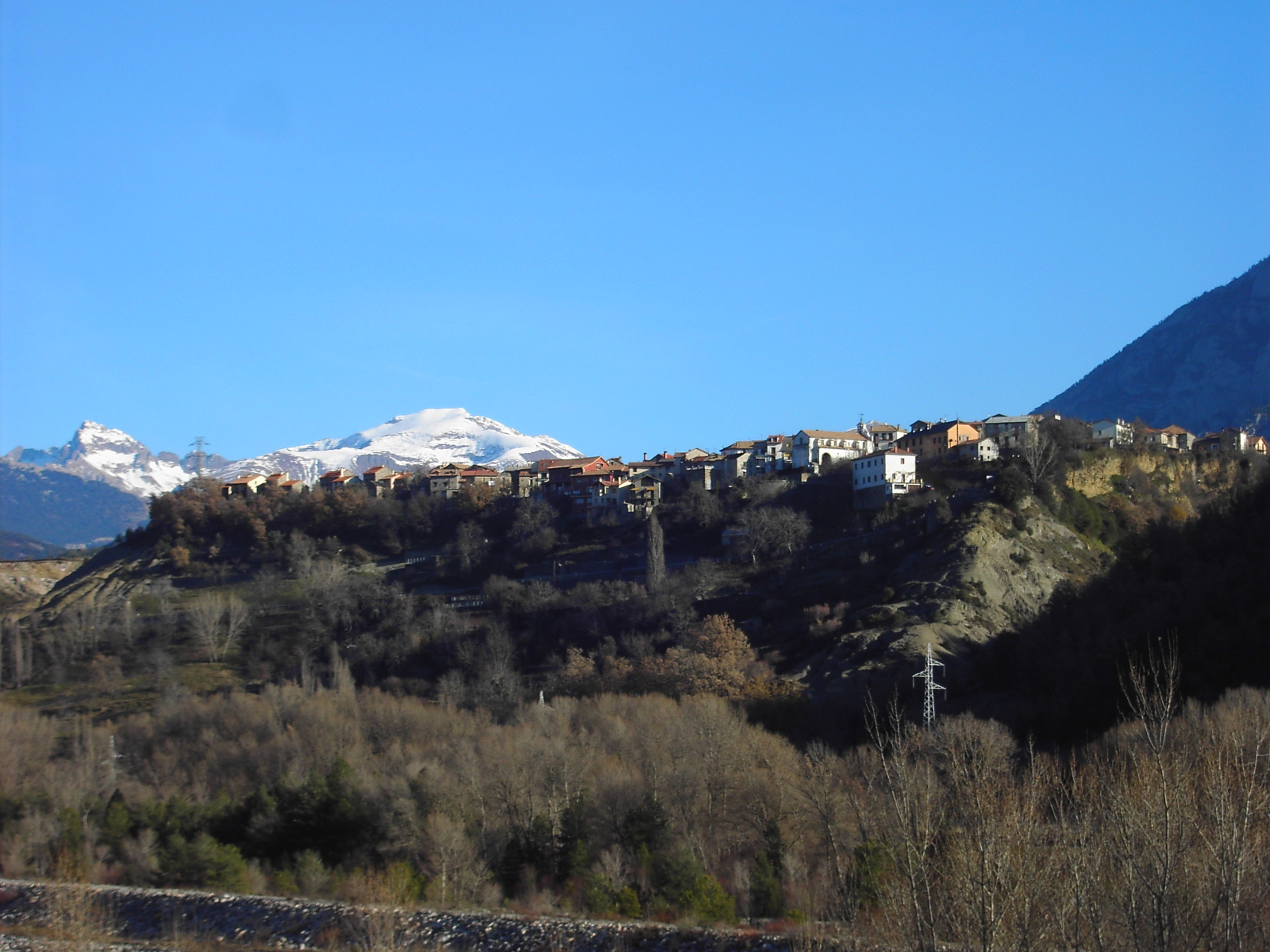
View of Laspuña

Laspuña (in Aragonese: A Espunya) is a municipality located in the province of Huesca, Aragon, Spain. According to the 2018 census (INE), the municipality has a population of 291 inhabitants.

The massive rocky Peña Montañesa rise above the town.

== Villages ==
- Ceresa
- El Casa

== See also ==
- List of municipalities in Huesca
