= Torrelisa =

- Locality
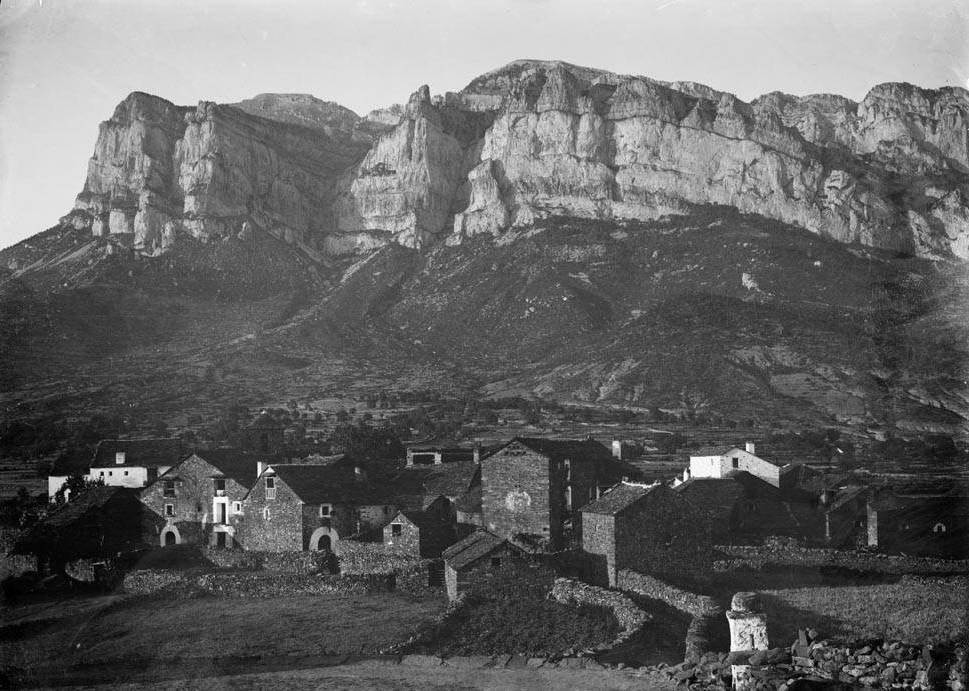

- Location within Aragon Location within Spain
- Coordinates: 42°27′33″N 0°11′13″E
- Country: Spain
- Autonomous community: Aragon
- Province: Province of Huesca
- Municipality: El Pueyo de Araguás
- Elevation: 900 m (3,000 ft)

Population
  - Total: 17

Torrelisa is a locality located in the municipality of El Pueyo de Araguás, in Huesca province, Aragon, Spain. As of 2020, it has a population of 17.

== Geography ==
Torrelisa is located 108km northeast of Huesca.
