= Peña Montañesa =

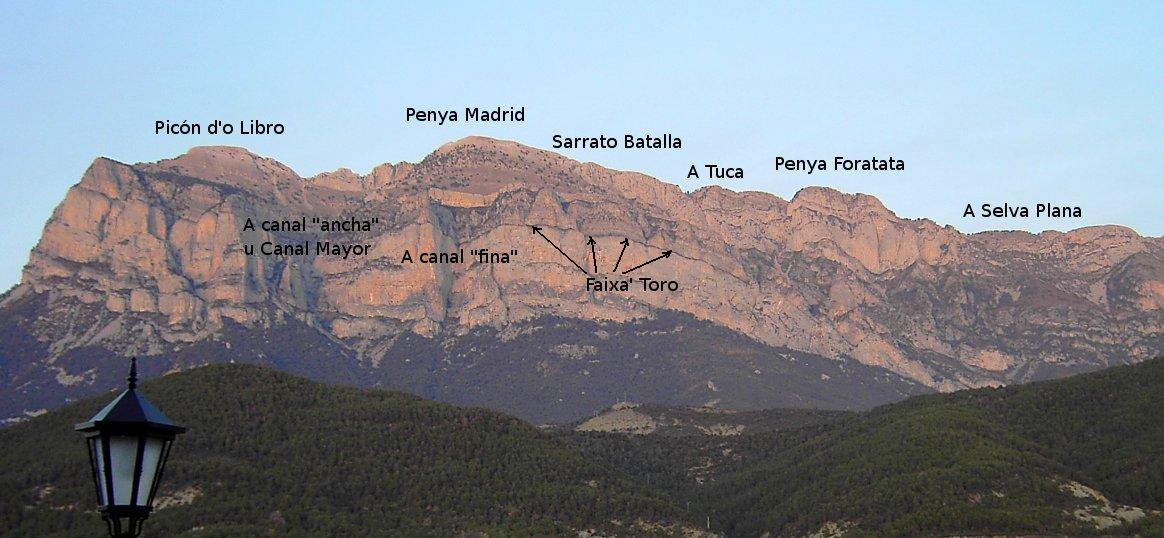

Highest point
- Elevation: 2,295 m (7,530 ft)
- Listing: List of mountains in Aragon
- Coordinates: 42°31′14″N 00°13′55″E

Geography
- Location within Spain
- Location: Sobrarbe (Aragon)
- Parent range: Sierra Ferrera

Geology
- Mountain type: Conglomerate

Climbing
- Easiest route: From Pueyo de Araguás

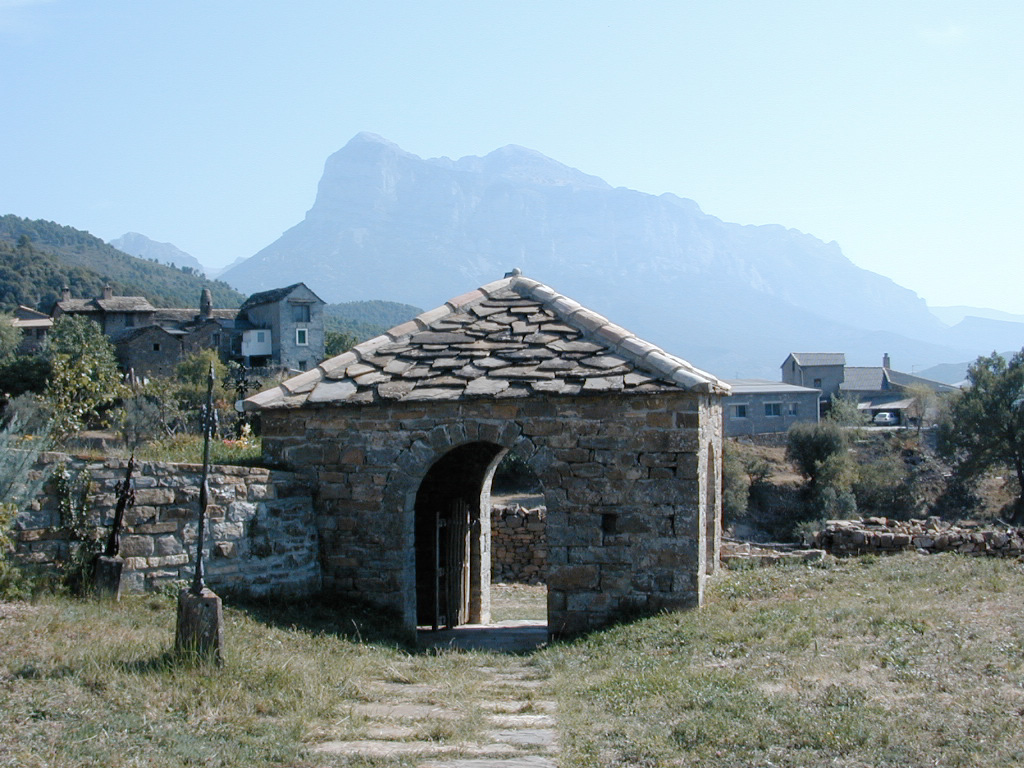
Exconjuratory in San Vicente de Labuerda with the Peña Montañesa towering behind it

The Peña Montañesa (Aragonese: Penya Montanyesa) is a conspicuous rocky mountainous outcrop of the Pre-Pyrenees. It is located east of the valley of the Cinca, in the Sobrarbe comarca, Aragon, Spain. The ridge's highest summit is 2295 m high. The village of Laspuña is located at the feet of the mountain.

The summits on the mountain offer excellent views of some of the main peaks of the Pyrenees in the north.

The Peña Montañesa was one of the strongholds of Spanish Republican resistance against invading troops supporting General Franco during the Bolsa de Bielsa episode.

The ruins of the Real Monasterio de San Victorián are located in El Pueyo de Araguás, at the foot of the Peña Montañesa.

== See also ==
- Real Monasterio de San Victorián
- Mountains of Aragon
